= Paul Kagame =

President of Rwanda since 2000

Paul Kagame MEOPA
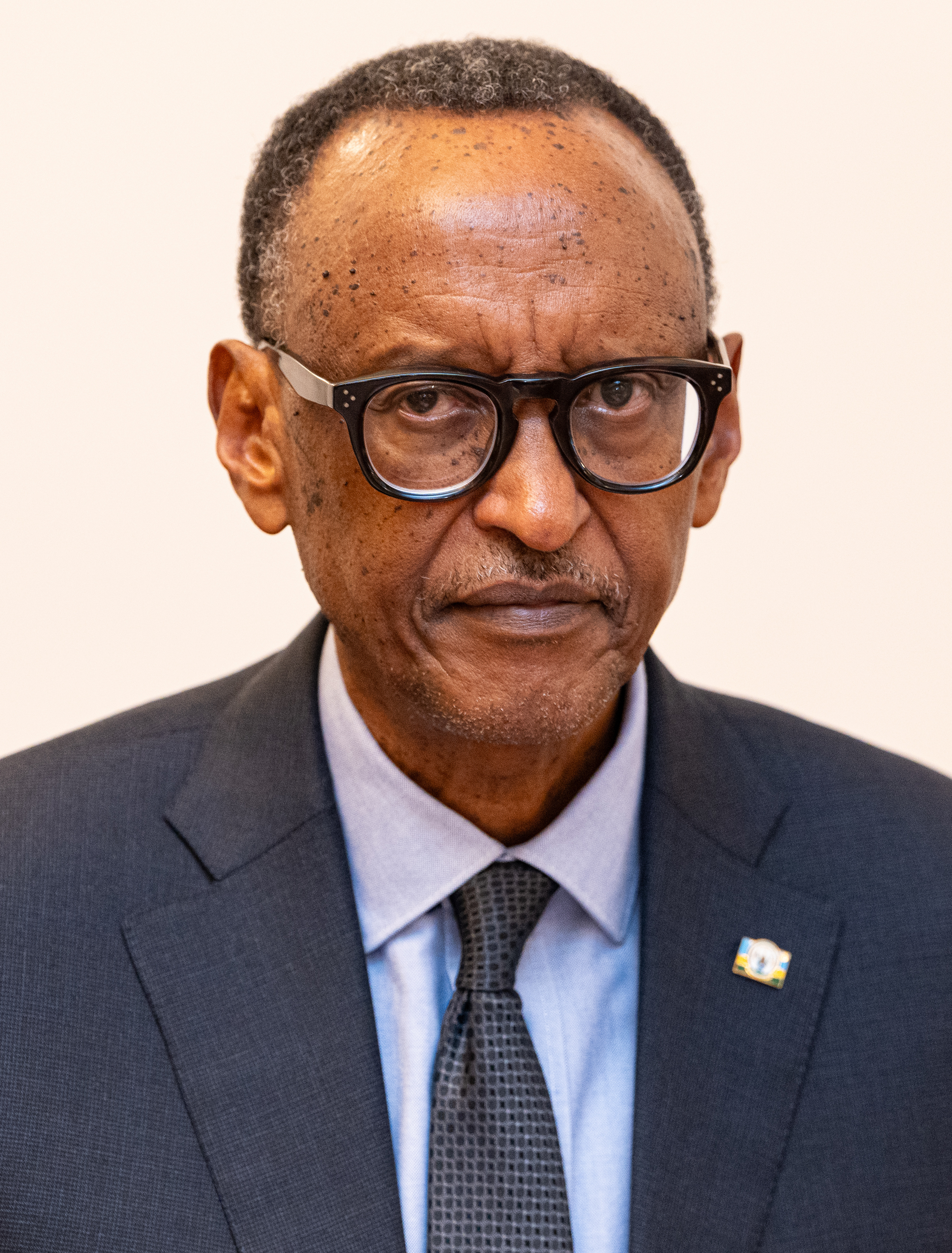
- Kagame in 2024

4th President of Rwanda
- Incumbent
- Assumed office 22 April 2000^{[a]}
- Prime Minister: Bernard Makuza; Pierre Habumuremyi; Anastase Murekezi; Édouard Ngirente; Justin Nsengiyumva
- Preceded by: Pasteur Bizimungu

16th Commonwealth Chair-in-Office
- In office 24 June 2022 – 25 October 2024
- Preceded by: Boris Johnson
- Succeeded by: Fiamē Naomi Mataʻafa

16th Chairperson of the African Union
- In office 28 January 2018 – 10 February 2019
- Preceded by: Alpha Condé
- Succeeded by: Abdel Fattah el-Sisi

Vice President of Rwanda
- In office 19 July 1994 – 22 April 2000
- President: Pasteur Bizimungu
- Preceded by: Office established
- Succeeded by: Office abolished

Minister of Defence
- In office 19 July 1994 – 22 April 2000
- President: Pasteur Bizimungu
- Preceded by: Augustin Bizimana
- Succeeded by: Emmanuel Habyarimana

Personal details
- Born: 23 October 1957 (age 69) Tambwe, Gitarama Province, Ruanda-Urundi (now Nyarutovu, Rwanda)
- Party: Rwandan Patriotic Front
- Spouse: Jeannette Nyiramongi (m. 1989)
- Children: 4
- Education: Command and General Staff College
- Website: Official website

Military service
- Allegiance: (Uganda) National Resistance Army (1979–1990); Rwandan Patriotic Front (since 1990); Rwanda (since 1994)
- Years of service: 1979–2000
- Battles/wars: Conflicts: Ugandan Bush War; War in Uganda (1986–1994); Rwandan Civil War; First Congo War; Second Congo War
- De facto leader of Rwanda: ← Bagosora (Note: as Chairman of the Crisis Committee); Currently in role
- a. Acting: 24 March – 22 April 2000

Paul Kagame (Note: /kəˈɡɑːmeɪ/ kə-GAH-may) (born 23 October 1957) is a Rwandan politician and former military officer who has been the president of Rwanda since 2000. He is considered to be Rwanda's de facto leader since 1994, from 1994 till 2000 while Vice President and Minister of Defence under President Pasteur Bizimungu. He was previously a commander of the Rwandan Patriotic Front (RPF), a rebel armed force which invaded Rwanda in 1990. The RPF was one of the main belligerents of the Rwandan Civil War and was the armed force which ended the 1994 Rwandan genocide.

Born to a Tutsi family in southern Rwanda that fled to Uganda when he was two years old, Kagame spent the rest of his childhood there during the Rwandan Revolution, which ended Tutsi political dominance. In the 1980s, Kagame fought in Yoweri Museveni's rebel army becoming a senior Ugandan army officer after many military victories led Museveni to the Ugandan presidency. Kagame joined the RPF, taking control of the group when previous leader Fred Rwigyema died on the second day of the 1990 invasion. By 1993, the RPF controlled significant territory in Rwanda and a ceasefire was negotiated. The assassination of Rwandan president Juvénal Habyarimana set off the genocide, in which Hutu extremists killed an estimated 500,000 to 800,000 Tutsi and moderate Hutu. Kagame resumed the civil war and ended the genocide with a military victory.

During his vice presidency, Kagame controlled the national army and was responsible for maintaining the government's power, while other officials began rebuilding the country. Many RPF soldiers carried out retribution killings. Kagame said he did not support these killings but failed to stop them. Hutu refugee camps formed in Zaire and other countries and the RPF attacked the camps in 1996, but insurgents continued to attack Rwanda. As part of the invasion, Kagame sponsored two rebel wars in Zaire. Rwandan- and Ugandan-backed rebels won the first war (1996–97), installing Laurent-Désiré Kabila as president in place of dictator Mobutu Sese Seko and returning Zaire to its former pre-Mobutu name, the Democratic Republic of the Congo (DRC). The second war was launched in 1998 against Kabila, and later his son Joseph, following the DRC government's expulsion of Rwandan and Ugandan military forces from the country. The war escalated into a conflict that lasted until a 2003 peace deal and ceasefire.

Bizimungu resigned in 2000, most likely having been forced to do so, following a falling out with the RPF. He was replaced by Kagame. Bizimungu was later imprisoned for corruption and inciting ethnic violence, charges that human rights groups described as politically motivated. Kagame's rule is considered authoritarian, and human rights groups accuse him of political repression. Overall opinion on the regime by foreign observers is mixed, and as president, Kagame has prioritised national development, launching programmes which have led to development on key indicators including healthcare, education and economic growth. Kagame has had mostly good relations with the East African Community and the United States; his relations with France were poor until 2009. Relations with the DRC remain tense despite the 2003 ceasefire; human rights groups and a leaked United Nations report allege Rwandan support for two insurgencies in the country, a charge Kagame denies. Several countries suspended aid payments in 2012 following these allegations. Since coming to power, Kagame has won four presidential elections, but none of these have been rated free or fair by international observers. His role in the assassination of exiled political opponents has been controversial.

== Early life ==
Kagame was born on 23 October 1957, the youngest of six children, in Tambwe, Ruanda-Urundi, a village located in what is now the Southern Province of Rwanda. His father, Deogratias Rutagambwa, was a member of the Tutsi ethnic group, from which the royal family had been derived since the 18th century or earlier. A member of the Bega clan, Deogratias Rutagambwa had family ties to King Mutara III, but he pursued an independent business career rather than maintain a close connection to the royal court. However, Rutagambwa's uncle Rwubusisi was a powerful and influential politician. Kagame's mother, Asteria Bisinda, descended from the family of the last Rwandan queen, Rosalie Gicanda, that is from the Hebera branch of the royal Nyiginya clan.

At the time of Kagame's birth, Rwanda was a United Nations Trust Territory which had been ruled, in various forms, by Belgium since 1916 under a mandate to oversee eventual independence. Rwandans were made up of three distinct groups: the minority Tutsi were the traditional ruling class, and the Belgian colonial administration had long promoted Tutsi supremacy, while the majority Hutu were agriculturalists. The third group, the Twa, were a forest-dwelling pygmy people descended from Rwanda's earliest inhabitants, who formed less than 1% of the population.

Tensions between Tutsi and Hutu had been escalating during the 1950s, and culminated in the 1959 Rwandan Revolution. Hutu activists began killing Tutsi, forcing more than 100,000 Tutsis to seek refuge in neighbouring countries. Kagame's family abandoned their home and lived for two years in northeastern Rwanda, eventually crossing the border into Uganda. They moved gradually north, and settled in the Nshungerezi refugee camp in the Toro sub-region in 1962. It was around this time that Kagame first met Fred Rwigyema, the future leader of the Rwandan Patriotic Front.

Kagame began his primary education in a school near the refugee camp, where he and other Rwandan refugees learned how to speak English and began to integrate into Ugandan culture. At the age of nine, he moved to the respected Rwengoro Primary School, around 16 kilometres (10 mi) away. He subsequently attended Ntare School, one of the best schools in Uganda, which was also the alma mater of future Ugandan President Yoweri Museveni. According to Kagame, the death of his father in the early-1970s, and the departure of Rwigyema to an unknown location, led to a decline in his academic performance and an increased tendency to fight those who belittled the Rwandan population. He was eventually suspended from Ntare and completed his studies at Old Kampala Secondary School.

After completing his education, Kagame made two visits to Rwanda, in 1977 and 1978. He was initially hosted by family members of his former classmates, but upon arrival in Kigali, he made contact with members of his own family. He kept a low profile on these visits, believing that his status as a well-connected Tutsi exile could lead to arrest. On his second visit, he entered the country through Zaire rather than Uganda to avoid suspicion. Kagame used his time in Rwanda to explore the country, familiarise himself with the political and social situation, and make connections that would prove useful to him in his later activities.

== Military career, 1979–1994 ==
=== Ugandan Bush War ===
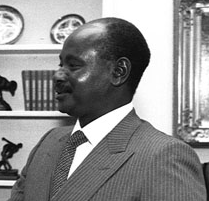
Kagame served under Yoweri Museveni (pictured) in the Ugandan Bush War.

In 1978, Fred Rwigyema returned to western Uganda and reunited with Kagame. During his absence, Rwigyema had joined the rebel army of Yoweri Museveni. Based in Tanzania, it aimed to overthrow the Ugandan government of Idi Amin. Rwigyema returned to Tanzania and fought in the 1979 war during which Museveni's rebel group, FRONASA, allied with the Tanzanian army and other Ugandan exiles, defeated Amin. After Amin's defeat, Kagame and other Rwandan refugees pledged allegiance to Museveni, who had become a cabinet member in the transition government. Kagame received training at the United States Army Command and General Staff College, Fort Leavenworth, Kansas.

Former incumbent Milton Obote won the 1980 Ugandan general election. Museveni disputed the result, and he and his followers withdrew from the new government in protest. In 1981, Museveni formed the rebel Popular Resistance Army (PRA); Kagame and Rwigyema joined as founding soldiers, along with 38 Ugandans. The army's goal was to overthrow Obote's government, in what became known as the Ugandan Bush War. Kagame took part in the Battle of Kabamba, the PRA's first operation, in February 1981.

Kagame and Rwigema joined the PRA primarily to ease conditions for Rwandan refugees persecuted by Obote. They also had a long-term goal of returning with other Tutsi refugees to Rwanda; military experience would enable them to fight the Hutu-dominated Rwandan army. The PRA merged with another rebel group in June 1981, forming the National Resistance Army (NRA). In the NRA, Kagame specialized in intelligence-gathering, and he rose to a position close to Museveni's. The NRA, based in the Luwero Triangle, fought the Ugandan army for the next five years, even after Obote was deposed in a 1985 coup d'état and the start of peace talks.

In 1986, the NRA captured Kampala with a force of 14,000 soldiers, including 500 Rwandans, and formed a new government. After Museveni's inauguration as president he appointed Kagame and Rwigyema as senior officers in the new Ugandan army; Kagame was the head of military intelligence. In a 2018 paper, Canadian scholar and Rwanda expert Gerald Caplan described this appointment as a remarkable achievement for a foreigner and a refugee. Caplan noted Museveni's reputation for toughness, and said that Kagame would have had to be similarly tough to earn such a position. He also commented on the nature of military intelligence work, saying "it is surely unrealistic to expect that Kagame refrained from the kind of unsavory activities that military security specializes in." In addition to their army duties, Kagame and Rwigyema began building a covert network of Rwandan Tutsi refugees within the army's ranks, intended as the nucleus for an attack on Rwanda. In 1989, Rwanda's President Habyarimana and many Ugandans in the army began to criticise Museveni over his appointment of Rwandan refugees to senior positions, and he demoted Kagame and Rwigyema.

Kagame and Rwigyema remained de facto senior officers, but the change caused them to accelerate their plans to invade Rwanda. They joined an organisation called the Rwandan Patriotic Front (RPF), a refugee association which had been operating under various names since 1979. Rwigyema became the RPF leader shortly after joining and, while still working for the Ugandan army, he and Kagame completed their invasion plans.

=== Rwandan Civil War ===
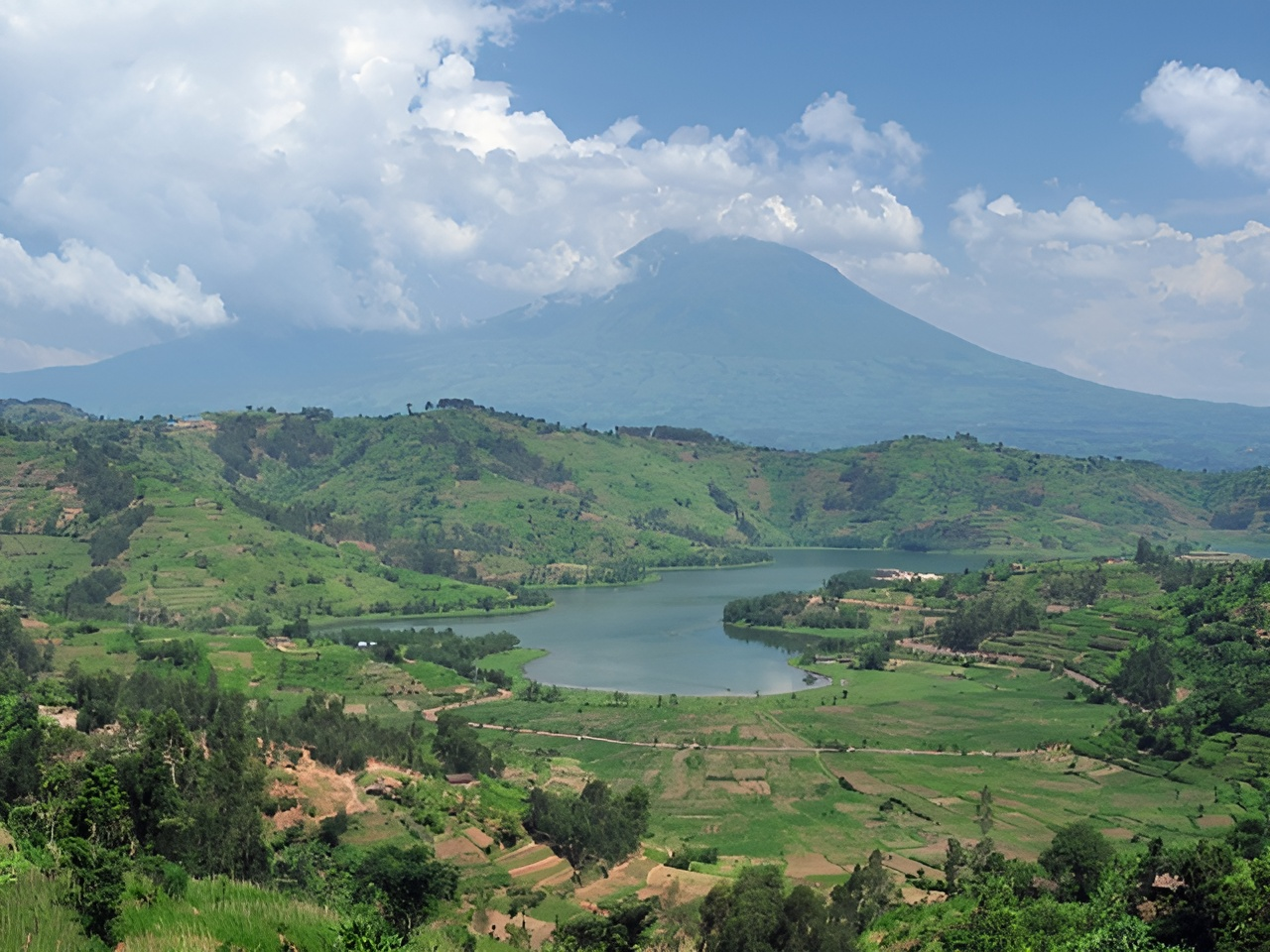
The Virunga Mountains, Kagame's RPF base from 1990 to 1991

In October 1990, Rwigyema led a force of over 4,000 RPF rebels into Rwanda at the Kagitumba border post, advancing 60 km (37 mi) south to the town of Gabiro. Kagame was not present at the initial raids, as he was in the United States, attending the Command and General Staff College in Fort Leavenworth, Kansas. On the second day of the attack, Rwigyema was shot in the head and killed. The exact circumstances are disputed; the official line of Kagame's government, and the version mentioned by historian Gérard Prunier in his 1995 book on the subject, was that Rwigyema was killed by a stray bullet.

In his 2009 book Africa's World War, Prunier says Rwigyema was killed by his subcommander Peter Bayingana, following an argument over tactics. According to this account, Bayingana and fellow subcommander Chris Bunyenyezi were then executed on the orders of Museveni. In a 2005 conversation with Caplan, Prunier provided a different account, stating that Bayingana and Bunyenyezi's killers were recruited by Kagame. Caplan notes that lack of research means the truth of this is uncertain, but that if true, the "tales of death and intrigue [offer] yet another insight into Kagame's character". Rwigyema's death threw the RPF into confusion. France and Zaire deployed forces in support of the Rwandan army, and by the end of October, the RPF had been pushed back into the far north east corner of the country.

Kagame returned to Africa and took command of the RPF forces, which had been reduced to fewer than 2,000 troops. Kagame and his soldiers moved west, through Uganda, to the Virunga Mountains, a rugged high-altitude area where the terrain worked in their favour. From there, he re-armed and reorganised the army, and carried out fundraising and recruitment from the Tutsi diaspora. Kagame restarted combat in January 1991, with an attack on the northern town of Ruhengeri. Benefiting from the element of surprise, the RPF captured the town and held it for a day before retreating back into the forests.

For the next year, the RPF waged a hit-and-run guerrilla war, capturing some border areas but not making significant gains against the Rwandan army. These actions caused an exodus of around 300,000 Hutu from the affected areas. Prunier wrote in 1995 that the RPF were surprised that Hutu peasants "showed no enthusiasm for being 'liberated' by them". In her 2018 book In Praise of Blood, however, Canadian journalist Judi Rever quoted witnesses who said that the exodus was forced by RPF attacks on the villages including the laying of landmines and shooting of children. Caplan's paper questions the credibility of many of the witnesses Rever had spoken to, but noted that "there are considerable other sources besides Rever that attest to RPF war crimes".

Following the June 1992 formation of a multi-party coalition government in Kigali, Kagame announced a ceasefire and initiated negotiations with the Rwandan government in Arusha, Tanzania. In early-1993, groups of extremist Hutu formed and began campaigns of large-scale violence against the Tutsi. Kagame responded by suspending peace talks temporarily and launching a major attack, gaining a large swathe of land across the north of the country.

Peace negotiations resumed in Arusha, and the resulting set of agreements, known as the Arusha Accords, were signed in August 1993. The RPF were given positions in a broad-based transitional government (BBTG) and in the national army. The United Nations Assistance Mission for Rwanda (UNAMIR), a peacekeeping force, arrived and the RPF were given a base in the national parliament building in Kigali to use during the establishment of the BBTG.

=== Rwandan genocide ===
On 6 April 1994, Rwandan President Habyarimana's plane was shot down near Kigali Airport, killing both Habyarimana and the President of Burundi, Cyprien Ntaryamira, as well as their entourage and three French crew members. The attackers remain unknown. Prunier, in his 1995 book, concluded that it was most likely a coup d'état carried out by extreme Hutu members of Habyarimana's government who feared that the president was serious about honouring the Arusha agreement, and was a planned part of the genocide. This theory was disputed in 2006 by French judge Jean-Louis Bruguière, and in 2008 by Spanish judge Fernando Andreu. Both alleged that Kagame and the RPF were responsible.

Rever also held Kagame responsible, giving as his motive a desire to plunge Rwanda into disorder and therefore provide a platform for the RPF to complete their conquest of the country. Evaluating the two arguments later in 2018, Caplan questioned the evidence used by Bruguière and Rever, stating that it has been repeatedly "discredited for its methodology and its dependence on sources who have split bitterly with Kagame". Caplan also noted that Hutu extremists had made multiple prior threats to kill Habyarimana in their journals and radio stations, and cited eyewitness accounts of roadblocks being erected in Kigali and killings initiated within one hour of the crash – evidence that the shooting of the plane was ordered as the initiation of the genocide.

Following Habyarimana's death, a military committee led by Colonel Théoneste Bagosora took immediate control of the country. Under the committee's direction, the Hutu militia Interahamwe and the Presidential Guard began to kill Hutu and Tutsi opposition politicians and other prominent Tutsi figures. The killers then targeted the entire Tutsi population, as well as moderate Hutu, beginning the Rwandan genocide. Over the course of approximately 100 days, an estimated 206,000 to 800,000 Tutsi and moderate Hutu were killed on the orders of the committee. On 7 April, Kagame warned the committee and UNAMIR that he would resume the civil war if the killing did not stop.

The next day, the Rwandan government forces attacked the national parliament building from several directions, but the RPF troops stationed there successfully fought back. Kagame began an attack from the north on three fronts, seeking to link up quickly with the troops isolated in Kigali. An interim government was set up but Kagame refused to talk to it, believing that it was just a cover for Bagosora's rule. Over the next few days, the RPF advanced steadily south, capturing Gabiro and large areas of countryside to the north and east of Kigali. They avoided attacking Kigali or Byumba at this stage, but conducted manoeuvres designed to encircle the cities and cut off supply routes.

Throughout April there were numerous attempts by UNAMIR to establish a ceasefire, but Kagame insisted each time that the RPF would not stop fighting unless the killings stopped. In late April, the RPF secured the whole of the Tanzanian border area and began to move west from Kibungo, to the south of Kigali. They encountered little resistance, except around Kigali and Ruhengeri. By 16 May, they had cut the road between Kigali and Gitarama, the temporary home of the interim government, and by 13 June, they had taken Gitarama, following an unsuccessful attempt by the Rwandan government forces to reopen the road. The interim government was forced to relocate to Gisenyi in the far north west. As well as fighting the war, Kagame was recruiting heavily to expand the army. The new recruits included Tutsi survivors of the genocide and refugees from Burundi, but were less well trained and disciplined than the earlier recruits.

Having completed the encirclement of Kigali, Kagame spent the latter half of June fighting to take the city. The government forces had superior manpower and weapons, but the RPF steadily gained territory, as well as conducting raids to rescue civilians from behind enemy lines. According to Roméo Dallaire, the force commander of UNAMIR, this success was due to Kagame being a "master of psychological warfare"; he exploited the fact that the government forces were concentrating on the genocide rather than the fight for Kigali, and capitalised on the government's loss of morale as it lost territory. The RPF finally defeated the Rwandan government forces in Kigali on 4 July, and on 18 July took Gisenyi and the rest of the north west, forcing the interim government into Zaire and ending the genocide. At the end of July 1994, Kagame's forces held the whole of Rwanda except for a zone in the south west, which had been occupied by a French-led United Nations force as part of Opération Turquoise.

Kagame's tactics and actions during the genocide have proved controversial. Western observers such as Dallaire and Luc Marchal, the senior Belgian peacekeeper in Rwanda at the time, have stated that the RPF prioritised taking power over saving lives or stopping the genocide. (Note: Marchal told Rever, "Not only did the RPF not show the slightest interest in protecting Tutsis, it fuelled the chaos. The RPF had one objective. It was to seize power and use the massacres as stock in trade to justify its military operations. This is what I saw." Meanwhile, Dallaire wrote in Shake Hands with the Devil that "the deaths of Rwandans can also be laid at the door of the military genius, Paul Kagame, who did not speed up his [military] campaign when the scale of the genocide became clear, and even talked candidly with me at several points about the price his fellow Tutsi might have to pay for the cause. The 'cause' was clear. It was not defeating the Government's forces to stop the genocide as soon as possible. It was continuing the civil war until the RPF could take over the entire country.") Scholars also believe that the RPF killed many Rwandan civilians, predominantly Hutu, during the genocide and in the months that followed. The death toll from these killings is in the tens or even hundreds of thousands. In her book Leave None to Tell the Story: Genocide in Rwanda, written for Human Rights Watch, Rwanda expert Alison des Forges wrote that despite saving many lives, the RPF "relentlessly pursued those whom they thought guilty of genocide" and that "in their drive for military victory and a halt to the genocide, the RPF killed thousands, including noncombatants as well as government troops and members of militia".

Human rights violations by the RPF during the genocide have also been documented in a 2000 report compiled by the Organisation of African Unity, and by Prunier in Africa's World War. In an interview with journalist Stephen Kinzer, Kagame acknowledged that killings had occurred but said that they were carried out by rogue soldiers and had been impossible to control. RPF killings continued after the end of the genocide, gaining international attention with the 1995 Kibeho massacre, in which soldiers opened fire on a camp for internally displaced persons in Butare Province. Australian soldiers serving as part of UNAMIR estimated at least 4,000 people were killed, while the Rwandan government claimed that the death toll was 338.

== Vice President and Minister of Defence ==
The post-genocide Rwandan government took office in Kigali in July 1994. It was based loosely on the Arusha Accords, but Habyarimana's party, MRND was outlawed. The positions it had been assigned were taken over by the RPF. The military wing of the RPF was renamed as the Rwandan Patriotic Army (RPA), and became the national army. Paul Kagame assumed the dual roles of Vice President of Rwanda and Minister of Defence while Pasteur Bizimungu, a Hutu who had been a civil servant under Habyarimana before fleeing to join the RPF, was appointed president. Bizimungu and his cabinet had some control over domestic affairs, but Kagame remained commander-in-chief of the army and was the de facto ruler of the country. German public broadcaster Deutsche Welle stated that "Bizimungu was commonly seen as a placeholder for Kagame".

=== Domestic situation ===
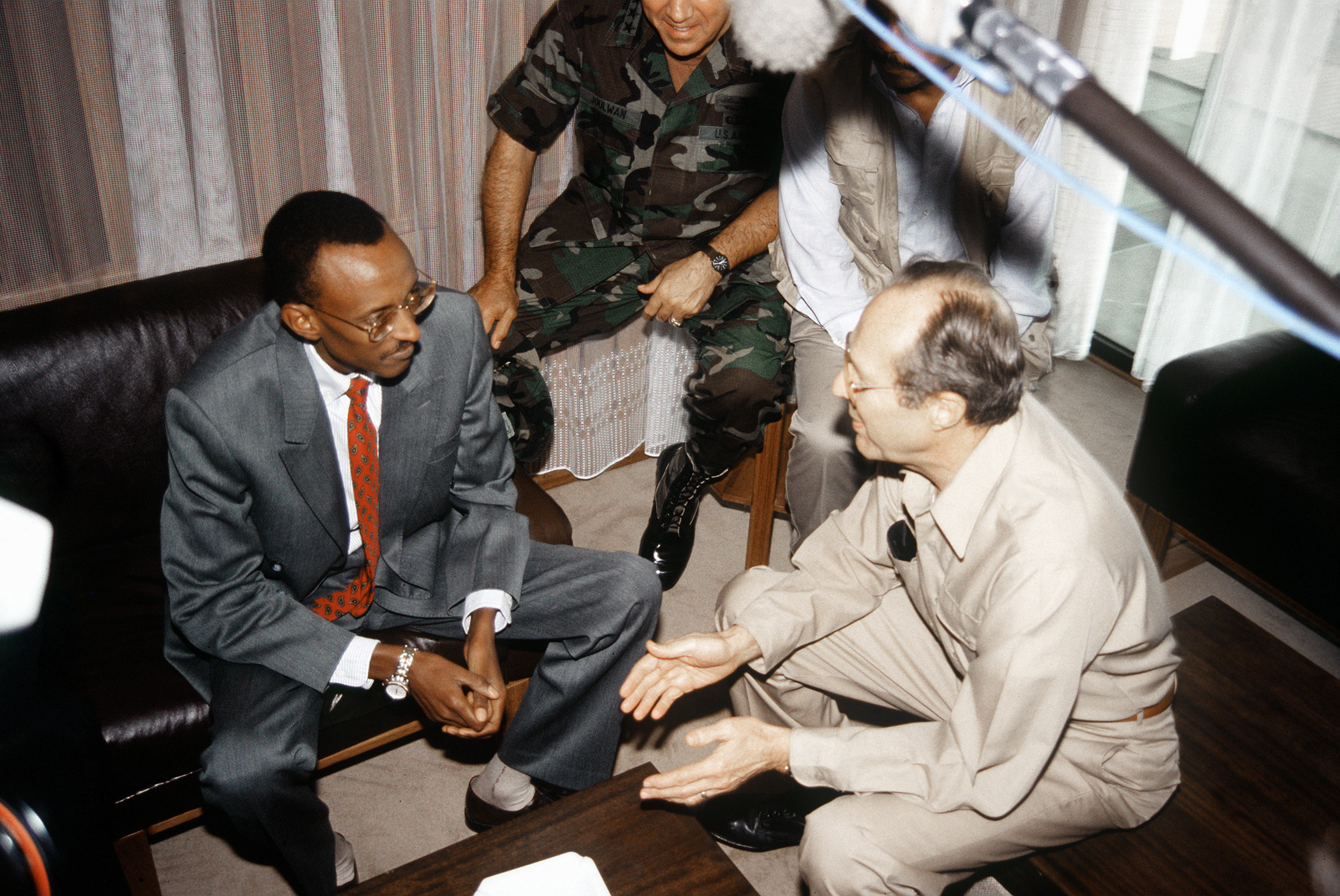
Vice President Kagame with United States Secretary of Defense William J. Perry, July 1994

The infrastructure and economy of the country suffered greatly during the genocide. Many buildings were uninhabitable, and the former regime had taken all currency and moveable assets when they fled the country. Human resources were also severely depleted, with over 40% of the population having been killed or fled. Many who remained were traumatised; most had lost relatives, witnessed killings, or participated in the genocide. Kagame controlled the national army and was responsible for maintaining the government's power, while other officials began rebuilding the country.

Non-governmental organisations began to move back into the country, and the international community spent US$1.5 billion on humanitarian aid between July and December 1994, but Prunier described this as "largely unconnected with the real economic needs of the community". Kagame strove to portray the government as inclusive and not Tutsi-dominated. He directed removal of ethnicity from citizens' national identity cards, and the government began a policy of downplaying the distinctions between Hutu, Tutsi, and Twa.

The unity government suffered a partial collapse in 1995. The continuing violence, along with appointing of local government officials who were almost exclusively RPF Tutsi, caused serious disagreement between Kagame and senior Hutu government members, including prime minister Faustin Twagiramungu and interior minister Seth Sendashonga. Twagiramungu resigned in August, and Kagame fired Sendashonga and three others the next day. Pasteur Bizimungu remained president but the makeup of the new government was predominantly RPF Tutsi loyal to Kagame.

Twagiramungu and Sendashonga moved abroad to form a new opposition party shortly after leaving the government. Sendashonga, who had also spoken out about the need for punishing killings by rogue RPF soldiers, moved to Kenya. Having survived an attempt on his life in 1996, he was assassinated in Nairobi in May 1998, when a UN vehicle in which he was travelling was fired upon. Many observers believe Kagame ordered the killing; as Caplan noted: "the RPF denied any responsibility, which no one other than RPF partisans believed".

=== Refugee crisis and insurgency ===
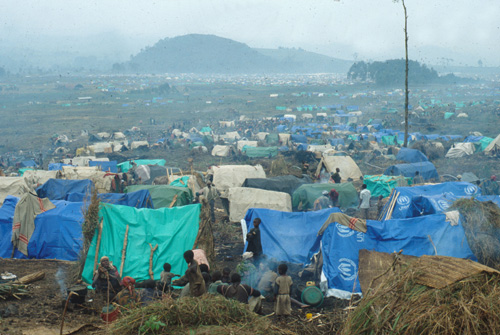
A refugee camp in Zaire, 1994

Following the RPF victory, approximately two million Hutu fled to refugee camps in neighboring countries, particularly Zaire, fearing RPF reprisals for the Rwandan genocide. The camps were set up by the United Nations High Commissioner for Refugees (UNHCR), but were effectively controlled by the army and government of the former Hutu regime, including many leaders of the genocide. This regime was determined to return to power in Rwanda and began rearming, killing Tutsi residing in Zaire, and launching cross-border incursions in conjunction with the Interahamwe paramilitary group. By late 1996, the Hutu militants represented a serious threat to the new Rwandan regime, and Kagame launched a counteroffensive.

Kagame first provided troops and military training to aid a rebellion against Zaire by the Banyamulenge, a Tutsi group living near Bukavu in the Zairian South Kivu province. With Rwandan army support, the Banyamulenge defeated local security forces and began attacking the Hutu refugee camps in the area. At the same time, Kagame's forces joined with Zairian Tutsi around Goma to attack two of the camps there. Most refugees from the attacked camps moved to the large Mugunga camp. In November 1996, the Rwandan army attacked Mugunga, causing an estimated 800,000 refugees to flee. Many returned to Rwanda despite the presence of the RPF; others ventured further west into Zaire.

Despite the disbanding of the camps, the defeated forces of the former regime continued a cross-border insurgency campaign into Rwanda from North Kivu. The insurgents maintained a presence in Rwanda's north western provinces and were supported by the predominantly Hutu population, many of whom had lived in the refugee camps before they were attacked. In addition to supporting the wars in the Congo, Kagame began a propaganda campaign to bring the Hutu to his side. He integrated former soldiers of the deposed genocidal regime's military into the RPF-dominated national army and appointed senior Hutu to key local government positions in the areas hit by insurgency. These tactics were eventually successful; by 1999, the population in the north west had stopped supporting the insurgency and the insurgents were mostly defeated.

=== Congo wars ===
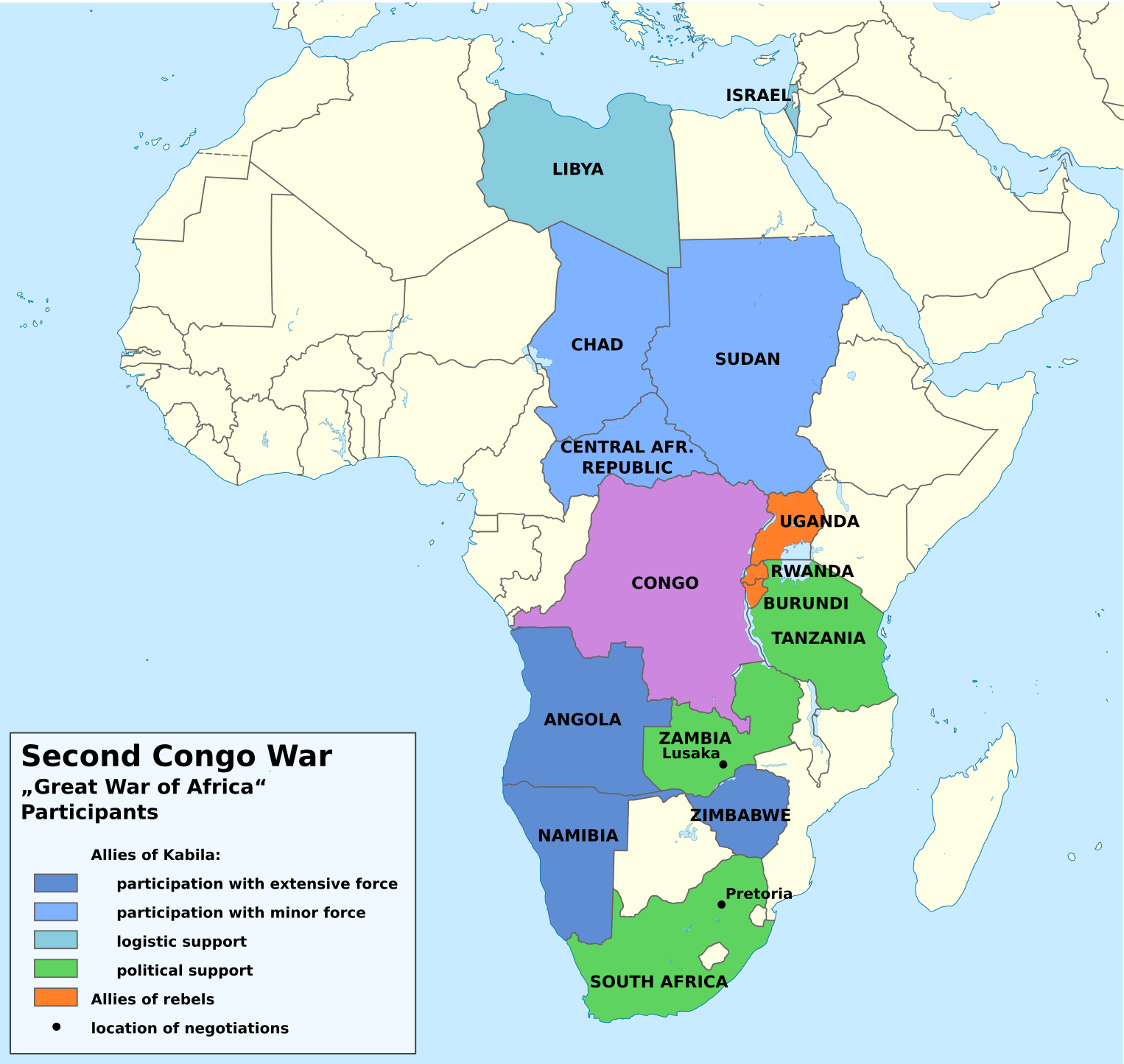
Belligerents of the Second Congo War

Although his primary reason for military action in Zaire was the dismantling of the refugee camps, Kagame also began planning a war to remove long-time dictator President Mobutu Sese Seko from power. Mobutu had supported the genocidaires based in the camps, and was also accused of allowing attacks on Tutsi people within Zaire. Together with Ugandan President Yoweri Museveni, Kagame supported the newly created Alliance of Democratic Forces for the Liberation of Congo (ADFL), an alliance of four rebel groups headed by Laurent-Désiré Kabila, which began waging the First Congo War.

The ADFL, helped by Rwandan and Ugandan troops, took control of North and South Kivu provinces in November 1996 and then advanced west, gaining territory from the poorly organised and demotivated Zairian army with little fighting. By May 1997, they controlled almost the whole of Zaire except for the capital Kinshasa; Mobutu fled and the ADFL took the capital without fighting. The country was renamed as the Democratic Republic of the Congo (DRC) and Kabila became the new president. The Rwandan Defence Forces and the ADFL were accused of carrying out mass atrocities during the First Congo War, with as many as 222,000 Rwandan Hutu refugees declared missing.

Kagame and the Rwandan government retained strong influence over Kabila following his inauguration, and the RPA maintained a heavy presence in Kinshasa. Congolese in the capital resented this, as did many in the eastern Kivu provinces, where ethnic clashes increased sharply. In July 1998, Kabila fired his Rwandan chief-of-staff, James Kabarebe, and ordered all RPA troops to leave the country. Kagame accused Kabila of supporting the ongoing insurgency against Rwanda from North Kivu, the same accusation he had made about Mobutu. He responded to the expulsion of his soldiers by backing a new rebel group, the Rally for Congolese Democracy (RCD), and launching the Second Congo War.

The first action of the war was a blitzkrieg by the RCD and RPA, led by Kabarebe. These forces made quick gains, advancing in twelve days from the Kivu provinces west to within 130 kilometres (81 mi) of Kinshasa. The capital was saved by the intervention of Angola, Namibia and Zimbabwe on Kabila's side. Following the failure of the blitzkrieg, the conflict developed into a long-term conventional war, which lasted until 2003 and caused millions of deaths and massive damage. According to a report by the International Rescue Committee (IRC), this conflict led to the loss of between 3 million and 7.6 million lives, many through starvation and disease accompanying the social disruption of the war.

Although Kagame's primary reason for the two wars in the Congo was Rwanda's security, he was alleged to gain economic benefit by exploiting the mineral wealth of the eastern Congo. The 2001 United Nations Report of the Panel of Experts on the Illegal Exploitation of Natural Resources and Other Forms of Wealth of the Democratic Republic of the Congo alleged that Kagame, along with Ugandan President Museveni, were "on the verge of becoming the godfathers of the illegal exploitation of natural resources and the continuation of the conflict in the Democratic Republic of the Congo". The report also claimed that the Rwandan Ministry of Defence contained a "Congo Desk" dedicated to collecting taxes from companies licensed to mine minerals around Kisangani, and that substantial quantities of coltan and diamonds passed through Kigali before being resold on the international market by staff on the Congo Desk.

International NGO Global Witness also conducted field studies in early 2013. It concluded that minerals from North and South Kivu are exported illegally to Rwanda and then marketed as Rwandan. Kagame dismissed these allegations as unsubstantiated and politically motivated; in a 2002 interview with newsletter Africa Confidential, Kagame said that if solid evidence against Rwandan officers was presented, it would be dealt with very seriously. In 2010, the United Nations released a report accusing the Rwandan army of committing wide scale human rights violations and crimes against humanity in the Democratic Republic of the Congo during the First and Second Congo Wars, charges denied by the Rwandan government.

== Presidency ==
=== Accession ===
In the late 1990s, Kagame began to disagree publicly with Bizimungu and the Hutu-led government in Rwanda. Kagame accused Bizimungu of corruption and poor management, while Bizimungu felt that he had no power over appointments to the cabinet and that the Transitional National Assembly was acting purely as a puppet for Kagame. Bizimungu resigned from the presidency in March 2000. Historians generally believe that Bizimungu was forced into resigning by Kagame after denouncing the National Assembly and attempting to sow discord within the RPF. However, Kagame told Kinzer that he was surprised by the development saying that he had received the "startling news" in a phone call from a friend. Following Bizimungu's resignation, the Supreme Court ruled that Kagame should become acting president until a permanent successor was chosen.

Kagame had been de facto leader since 1994, but focused more on military, foreign affairs and the country's security than day-to-day governance. By 2000, the threat posed by cross-border rebels was reduced and when Bizimungu resigned, Kagame decided to seek the presidency himself. The transitional constitution was still in effect, which meant the president was elected by government ministers and the Transitional National Assembly rather than by a direct election.

The RPF selected two candidates, Kagame and RPF secretary general Charles Murigande; the ministers and parliament elected Kagame by eighty-one votes to three. Kagame was sworn in as president in April 2000. Several Hutu politicians, including the prime minister Pierre-Célestin Rwigema, left the government at around the same time as Bizimungu, leaving a cabinet dominated by those close to Kagame. Bizimungu started his own party in 2001, but Kagame's government banned it on the grounds that political campaigning was not permitted under the transitional constitution. The following year, Kagame issued a public statement to Bizimungu, warning him that the government's patience with his continued involvement in party politics was "not infinite", and Bizimungu was arrested two weeks later and convicted of corruption and inciting ethnic violence, charges which human rights groups said were politically motivated. He was imprisoned until 2007, when he was pardoned by Kagame.

=== New constitution ===
Between 1994 and 2003, Rwanda was governed by a set of documents combining President Habyarimana's 1991 constitution, the Arusha Accords, and some additional protocols introduced by the transitional government. As required by the accords, Kagame set up a constitutional commission to draft a new permanent constitution. The constitution was required to adhere to a set of fundamental principles including equitable power sharing and democracy. The commission sought to ensure that the draft constitution was "home-grown", relevant to Rwanda's specific needs, and reflected the views of the entire population; they sent questionnaires to civil groups across the country and rejected offers of help from the international community, except for financial assistance.

The draft constitution was released in 2003; it was approved by the parliament, and was then put to a referendum in May of that year. The referendum was widely promoted by the government; ultimately, 95% of eligible adults registered to vote and the turnout on voting day was 87%. The constitution was overwhelmingly accepted, with 93% voting in favour. The constitution provided for a two-house parliament, an elected president serving seven-year terms, and multi-party politics.

The constitution also sought to prevent Hutu or Tutsi hegemony over political power. Article 54 states that "political organizations are prohibited from basing themselves on race, ethnic group, tribe, clan, region, sex, religion or any other division which may give rise to discrimination". According to Human Rights Watch, this clause, along with later laws enacted by the parliament, effectively make Rwanda a one-party state, as "under the guise of preventing another genocide, the government displays a marked intolerance of the most basic forms of dissent".

=== Elections and referendum ===
Since ascending to the presidency in 2000, Kagame has faced four presidential elections, in 2003, 2010, 2017 and 2024. On each occasion, he was re-elected in a landslide, winning more than 90 percent of the vote. A constitutional amendment referendum in 2015, which gave Kagame the ability to stand for additional terms, also passed by similar margins. International election monitors, human rights organisations and journalists generally regard these elections as lacking freedom and fairness, with interventions by the Rwandan state to ensure Kagame's victory. According to Ida Sawyer, Central Africa director for Human Rights Watch, "Rwandans who have dared raise their voices or challenge the status quo have been arrested, forcibly disappeared, or killed, independent media have been muzzled, and intimidation has silenced groups working on civil rights or free speech". Following the 2017 poll, Human Rights Watch released evidence of irregularities by election officials including forcing voters to write their votes in full view and casting votes for electors who had not appeared. The United States Department of State said it was "disturbed by irregularities observed during voting" as well as "long-standing concerns over the integrity of the vote-tabulation process".

In their 2018 book How to Rig an Election, political scientists Nic Cheeseman and Brian Klaas said they were asked by journalists why Kagame went "through the motions of organizing a national poll that he was predestined to win". The book gave likely reasons for the continuation of the polls, including the fact that elections are "important to secure a base level of international legitimacy" and that "not even pretending to hold elections will get a country kicked out of the African Union". Law professor and human rights researcher Lars Waldorf wrote that the RPF's manipulation of polls could be designed to make itself appear stronger. Waldorf said that the party's margins of victory "are not meant to be convincing; rather, they are meant to signal to potential opponents and the populace that Kagame and the RPF are in full control." Scholars are divided on whether Kagame would have won the elections had he not used manipulative tactics. Writing about RPF intimidation of opposition candidates in the run-up to elections, Caplan said "what was most infuriating was that none of this was necessary for the RPF to hold on to power". Belgian academic Filip Reyntjens disagrees, however, stating that "the RPF is fully aware that opening up the political system would eventually lead to a loss of power".

==== Presidential election, 2003 ====
The first post-genocide election was held in August 2003, following the adoption of the new constitution. In May, the parliament voted to ban the Republican Democratic Movement (MDR), following a parliamentary commission report accusing the MDR of "divisive" ideology. The MDR had been one of the coalition parties in the transitional government of national unity, and was the second-largest party in the country after the RPF. Amnesty International criticised this move, claiming that "the unfounded allegations against the individuals mentioned in the report appear to be part of a government-orchestrated crackdown on the political opposition". Kagame was the RPF candidate, while former prime minister Twagiramungu was his main challenger. Twagiramungu had intended to run as the candidate for the MDR, but instead sought the presidency as an independent following the party's banishment. He returned to the country from Europe in June 2003 and began campaigning in August.

Kagame declared victory in the election one day after the poll, and his win was later confirmed by the National Electoral Commission. The final results showed that Kagame received 95.1 per cent of the vote, Twagiramungu 3.6 per cent, and the third candidate, Jean Nepomuscene Nayinzira, 1.3 per cent; the voter turnout was 96.6 per cent. The campaign, election day, and aftermath were largely peaceful, although an observer from the European Union (EU) raised concerns about intimidation of opposition supporters by the RPF. Twagiramungu rejected the result of the election and also questioned the margin of victory, saying "Almost 100 per cent? That's not possible". He filed a petition at the Supreme Court to nullify the result, but was unsuccessful and he left Rwanda shortly afterwards, fearing that he would be arrested. The EU observer also questioned the result, citing "numerous irregularities", but also describing the poll as a "positive step" in the country's history.

==== Presidential election, 2010 ====
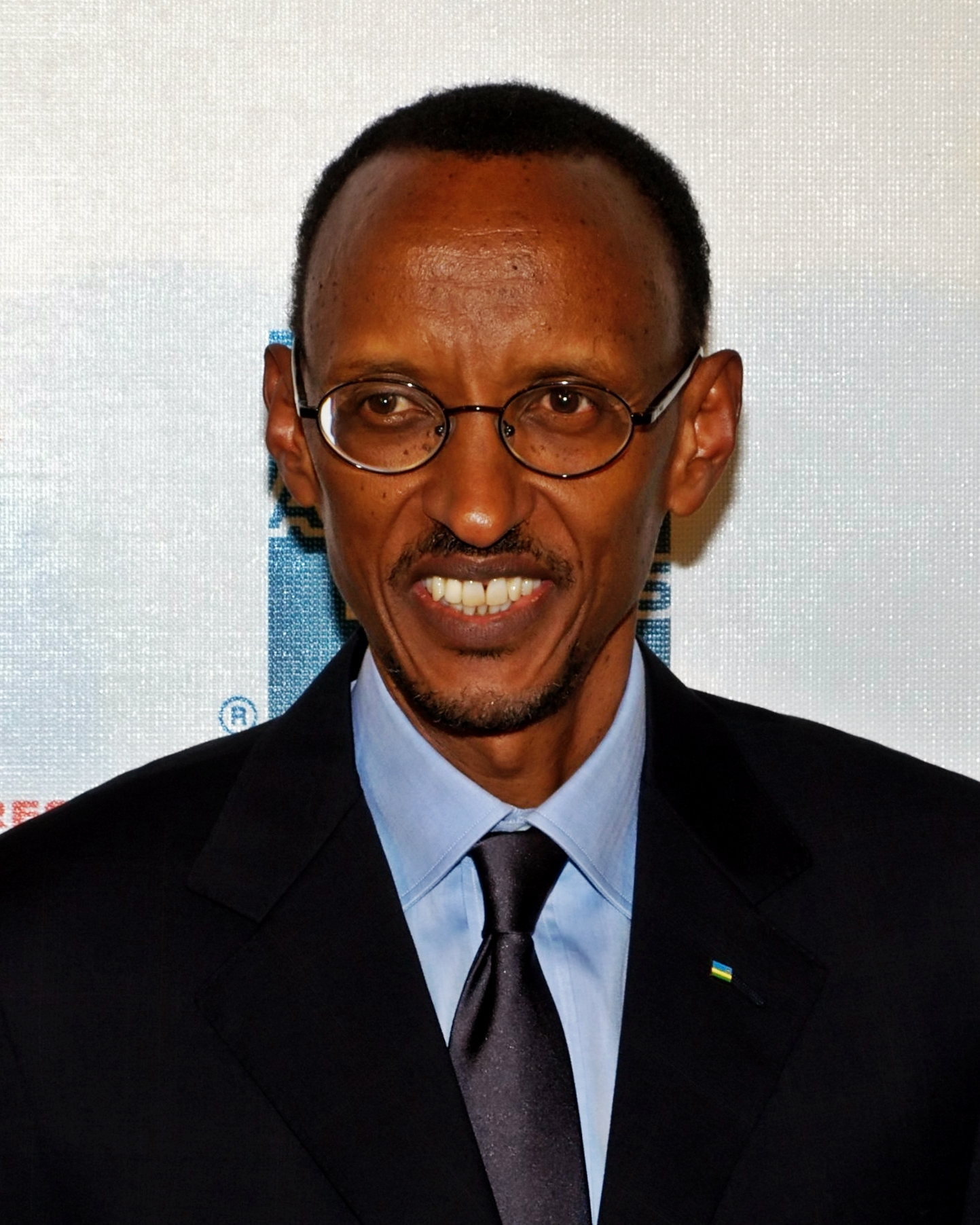
Kagame in 2010

Kagame ran for re-election in 2010, at the end of his first elected term. He was endorsed by the RPF national congress as their candidate in May 2010, and was accepted as a candidate in July. His highest-profile opponent was Victoire Ingabire, a Hutu who had been living abroad for some years, and returned to Rwanda in January 2010 to run for the presidency. After a series of criticisms of Kagame's policies, she was arrested in April and prohibited from running in the election, as part of what Amnesty International's Tawanda Hondora described as "pre-electoral repression". Kagame began his campaign with a rally at Kigali's Amahoro Stadium on 20 July, and held rallies across the country during the subsequent campaign period. The rallies attracted tens of thousands, shouting enthusiastically for Kagame, although reporters for The New York Times interviewed a number of Rwandans who said that they were "not free to vote against him and that government officials down to the village level had put enormous pressure on them to register to vote; contribute some of their meager earnings to Mr. Kagame's campaign; and attend rallies".

The election went ahead in August 2010 without Ingabire and two other banned candidates, Kagame facing three opponents described by Human Rights Watch as "broadly supportive of the RPF". Kagame went on to receive 93.08 per cent of the vote in the election. Opposition and human rights groups said that the election was tainted by repression, murder, and lack of credible competition. Kagame responded by saying "I see no problems, but there are some people who choose to see problems where there are not."

==== Constitutional referendum, 2015 ====
As Kagame's second term progressed, he began to hint that he might seek to rewrite the term-limit clause of the Rwandan constitution, to allow him to run for a third term in the 2017 elections. Earlier in his presidency he had ruled it out, but in a 2014 speech at Tufts University in the United States, Kagame said that he did not know when he would leave office, and that it was up to the Rwandan people to decide. He told delegates "...let's wait and see what happens as we go. Whatever will happen, we'll have an explanation." The following year, a protest occurred outside parliament, and a petition signed by 3.7 million people—more than half of the electorate—was presented to lawmakers asking for Kagame to be allowed to stay in office. The parliament responded by passing an amendment to the constitution in November 2015, with both the Chamber of Deputies and the Senate voting unanimously in favour. The motion passed kept the two-term limit in place, and also reduced the length of terms from 7 years to 5 years, but it made an explicit exception for Kagame, who would be permitted to run for a third 7-year term followed by two further 5-year terms, if he so desired. After the amendment was passed in parliament, a referendum was required for it to come into effect.

The referendum took place on 18 December 2015, with Rwandans overseas voting on 17 December. The amendment was approved by the electorate, with 6.16 million voters saying yes, approximately 98 per cent of the votes. The electoral commission stated that the vote had been peaceful and orderly. The Democratic Green Party, the most prominent domestic group opposing the change, protested that it had not been permitted to campaign openly against the amendment. Human Rights Watch executive director Ken Roth announced on Twitter that he did not believe the election to be free and fair, saying there was "no suspense in Rwanda referendum when so many dissidents silenced, civil society stifled". The amendment itself was criticised by the European Union and also the United States, which released a statement saying that Kagame should respect the previous term limits and "foster a new generation of leaders in Rwanda". Kagame responded that it was not his own decision to seek a third term, but that the parliament and the people had demanded it.

==== Presidential election, 2017 ====
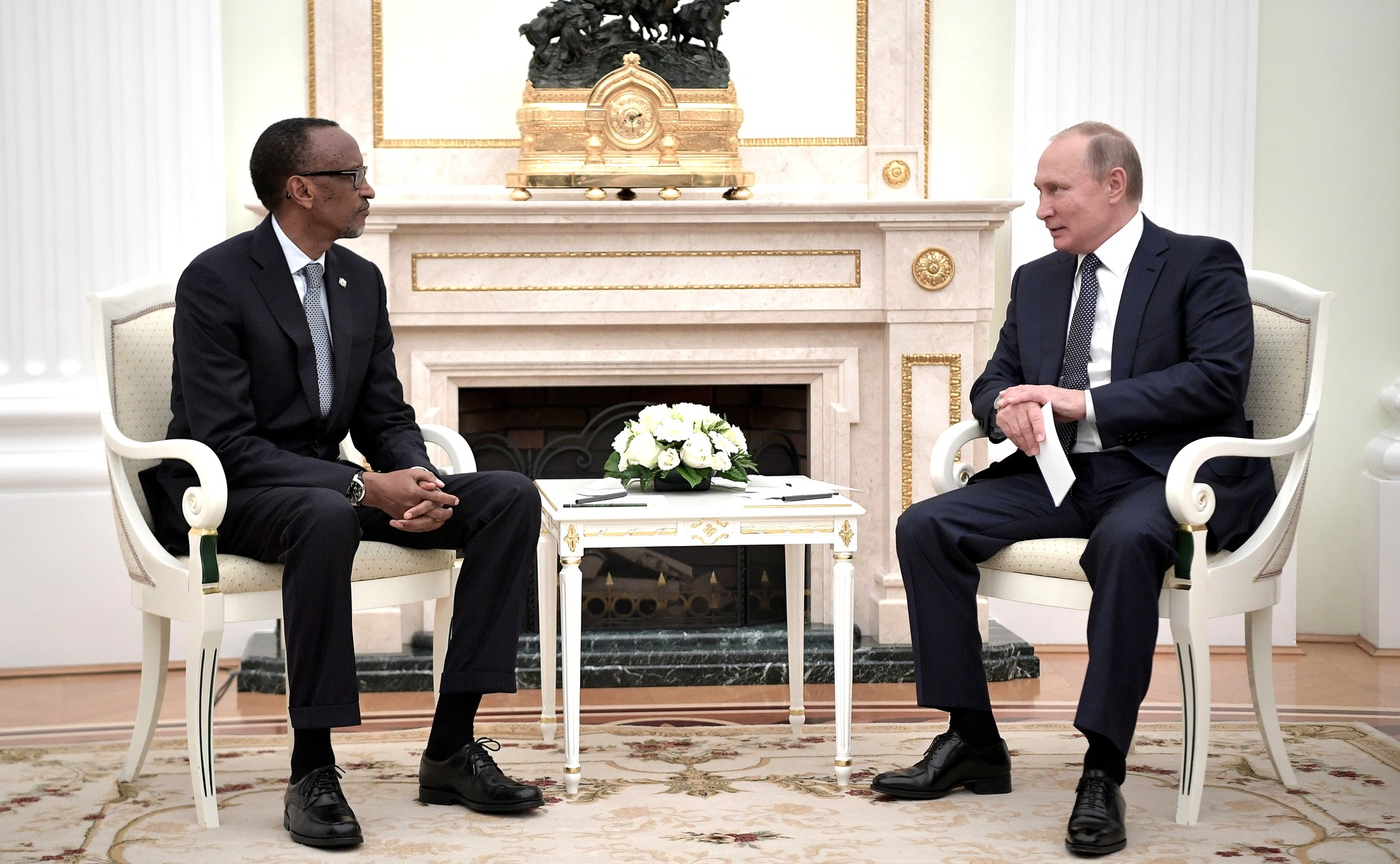
Kagame with Russian President Vladimir Putin in June 2018

In accordance with the constitutional change, a presidential election was held in August 2017. The highest-profile opposition figure for the 2017 election was local businesswoman Diane Rwigara. Although she acknowledged that "much has improved under Kagame", Rwigara was also critical of Kagame's government, saying that "people disappear, others get killed in unexplained circumstances and nobody speaks about this because of fear". Like Ingabire in 2010, Rwigara was barred from running in the election. Kagame was endorsed as the RPF's candidate for the election in mid-June, and began his re-election campaign in mid-July with a rally in Ruhango.

After three weeks of campaigning, concluding with a large rally in Gasabo District, the election went ahead between Kagame and two opposition candidates. Kagame was re-elected for a third term with 98.8 per cent of the vote, his highest percentage to date. He was sworn in for another seven-year term on 18 August. As with his previous victories, independent monitors and human rights organisations cited irregularities and intimidation in the conduct of the election. Cheeseman and Klaas said in their book that he had "not even bothered to try and manipulate the election in the clever ways" he had used in previous campaigns.

=== Domestic policy ===
==== Vision 2020 and Vision 2050 ====
In the late 1990s, Kagame began actively planning methods to achieve national development. He launched a national consultation process and also sought the advice of experts from emerging nations including China, Singapore and Thailand. Following these consultations, and shortly after assuming the presidency, Kagame launched an ambitious programme of national development called Vision 2020. The major purposes of the programme were to unite the Rwandan people and to transform Rwanda from a highly impoverished into a middle income country. The programme consists of a list of goals which the government aimed to achieve before the year 2020. These include reconstruction, infrastructure and transport improvements, good governance, improving agriculture production, private sector development, and health and education improvements.

In 2011, the Ministry of Finance and Economic Planning (MINECOFIN) issued a report indicating the progress of the Vision 2020 goals. The report examined the stated goals of the programme and rated each one with a status of "on-track", "on-watch" or "off-track". Of 44 goals, it found that 66% were on-track, 11% were on-watch, and 22% were off-track. The major areas identified as off-track were population, poverty and the environment. By 2012, MINECOFIN's review found that 26% of Vision 2020's original indicators had already been achieved. While also highlighting key areas for improvement, the review made several upward revisions, including revising the GDP per capita target from $900 to $1,240. In the same year, an independent review of the strategy carried out by academics based in Belgium rated progress as "quite encouraging", mentioning development in the education and health sectors, as well as Kagame's fostering of a favourable business environment. The review also raised concerns about the policy of "maximum growth at any cost", suggesting that this was leading to a situation in which the rich prospered while the rural poor saw little benefit.

Upon completion of the programme in December 2020, Kagame announced Vision 2050, remarking that "Vision 2020 was about what we had to do in order to survive and regain our dignity. But Vision 2050 has to be about the future we choose, because we can, and because we deserve it." Vision 2050 focuses around the two main pillars of Economic Growth and Prosperity and High Quality of Life and Standards of Life for Rwandans. Vision 2050 is the programmatic articulation of Kagame's ambition for Rwanda to become an upper-middle income country by 2035, and a high-income country by 2050.

==== Economy ====
A view of Kigali in 2018. Kagame has stated that he believes Rwanda can emulate the economic development of Singapore.

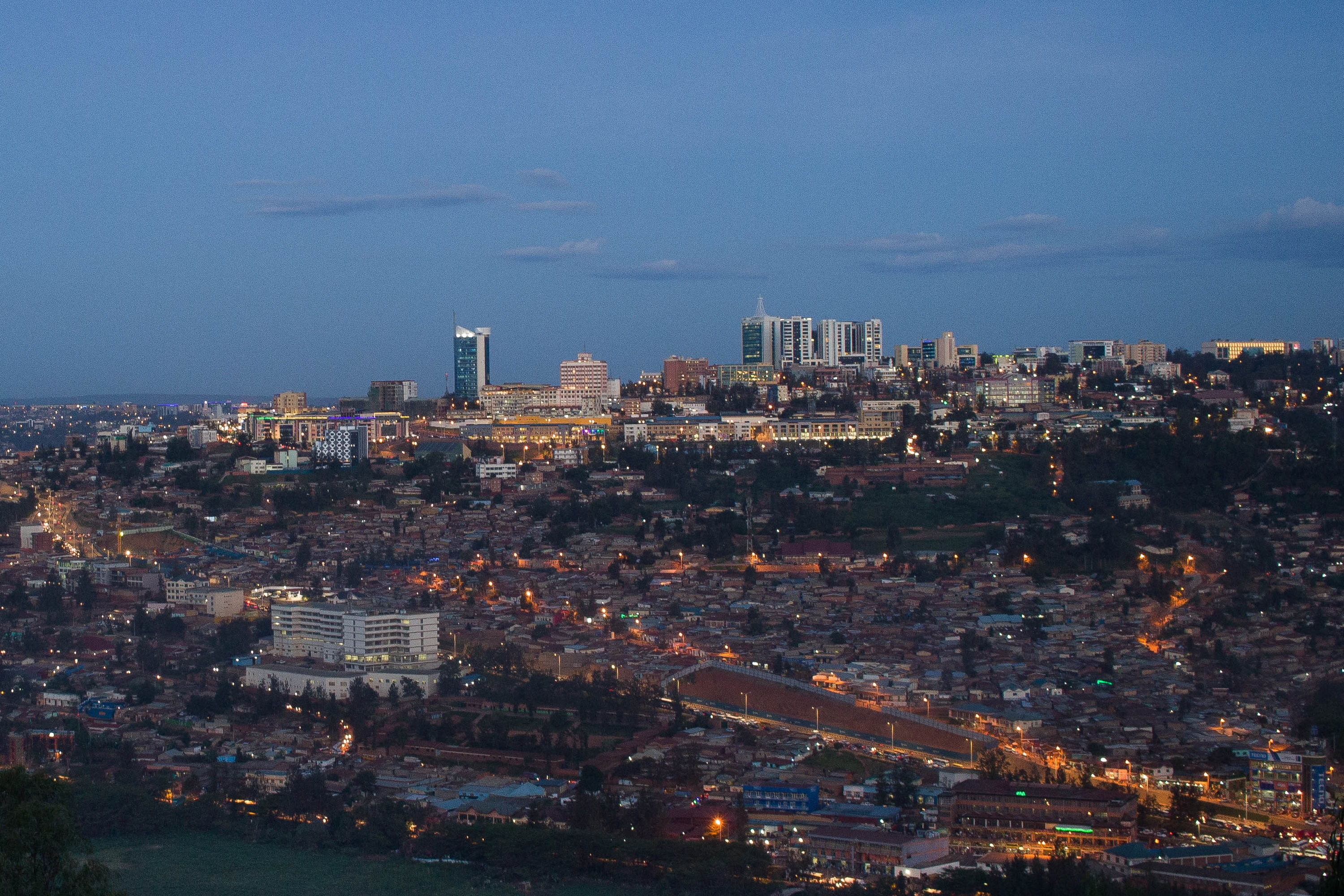
The skyline of Kigali in 2018

Rwanda is a country of few natural resources, and the economy is heavily dependent on subsistence agriculture, with an estimated 75% of the working population engaged in farming.

Under Kagame's presidency, the service sector has grown. It makes up approximately half of the country's GDP and is the second largest employer after agriculture. In 1995 Tri-Star Investments was founded, which in 2009 was renamed Crystal Ventures, an investment fund and financial arm of the Rwandese Patriotic Front. Paul Kagame is the de facto CEO of this holding company with an estimated capital of 500 million dollars which as of 2017 employed more than 12,000 people. Key tertiary contributors include banking and finance, wholesale and retail trade, hotels and restaurants, transport, storage, communication, insurance, real estate, business services, and public administration, including education and health.

Information and communications technology (ICT) has been a Vision 2020 priority, with a goal of transforming Rwanda into an ICT hub for Africa. To this end, the government has completed a 2,300 kilometres (1,400 mi) fibre-optic telecommunications network, intended to provide broadband services and facilitate electronic commerce. and in 2012 Crystal Telecom Rwanda was founded.

Tourism is one of the fastest-growing economic resources and became the country's leading foreign exchange earner in 2011. Rwanda has also illegally exploited Congolese minerals, which is an important aspect of the success of Rwanda's economy. Political economy researcher Stefaan Marysse estimated that in 1999, 6.1% of Rwanda's GDP came from illegal resource extraction in the DRC.

In 2013, foreign aid still made up over 20 percent of GDP and nearly half of the budget. Economic growth has disproportionally accrued to elites in the capital while rural areas lag behind. Although the government officially has a policy of privatization, in practice it has increased state control of the economy using corporations with strong ties to the state and the ruling party.

Rwanda's economy has grown rapidly under Kagame's continuous presidency since 2000, with per-capita gross domestic product (purchasing power parity) estimated at $2,214 in 2020, compared with $631 in 2000. Annual growth between 2000 and 2020 averaged 7% per year. (Note: Average of 8.371 (2000), 8.485 (2001), 13.192 (2002), 2.202 (2003), 7.448 (2004), 9.378 (2005), 9.227 (2006), 7.633 (2007), 11.161 (2008), 6.248 (2009), 7.335 (2010), 7.958 (2011), 8.642 (2012), 4.72 (2013), 6.167 (2014), 8.857 (2015), 5.971 (2016), 3.976 (2017), 8.579 (2018), 9.461 (2019), −3.355 (2020).) Kagame's economic policy is based on liberalising the economy, reducing red tape for businesses, and transforming the country from an agricultural to a knowledge-based economy. Kagame has stated that he believes Rwanda can emulate the economic development of Singapore since 1960. Kagame, as set out in his national Vision 2050 Policy, believes that Rwanda can become an upper middle income country by 2035, and a high income country by 2050.

Rwanda has ranked relatively highly in several categories of the World Bank's ease of doing business index: In 2005, after the country was ranked 158th on the Ease of Doing Business Index, Kagame set up a special unit to analyze the economy and provide solutions to easing business. As a result, the country topped the list of reformers in 2009. In 2012, the country's overall ease of doing business index ranking was 52nd out of 185 countries worldwide, and third out of 46 in Sub-Saharan Africa. It was eighth on the 2012 rankings for ease of starting a business; the Rwanda Development Board asserts that a business can be authorised and registered in 24 hours. The business environment and economy also benefit from relatively low corruption in the country; in 2010, Transparency International ranked Rwanda as the eighth cleanest out of 47 countries in Sub-Saharan Africa and sixty-sixth cleanest out of 178 in the world. As of 2010, the country was recognized internationally for its effective institutions and relatively low level of corruption.

Kagame's economic policy has been praised by foreign donors and investors, including Bill Clinton and Starbucks chairman Howard Schultz.

==== Education and health ====
Kagame has made education for youth in Rwanda a high priority for his administration, allocating 17% of the annual budget to the sector. The Rwandan government provides free education in state-run schools for twelve years: six years in primary and six in secondary school. The final three years of free education were introduced in 2012 following a pledge by Kagame during his 2010 re-election campaign. Kagame credits his government with improvements in the tertiary education sector; the number of universities has risen from 1 in 1994 to 29 in 2010, and the tertiary gross enrollment ratio increased from 4% in 2008 to 7% in 2011. From 1994 until 2009, secondary education was offered in either French or English; since 2009, due to the country's increasing ties with the East African Community and the Commonwealth of Nations, English has been the sole language of instruction in public schools from primary school grade 4 onward. The country's literacy rate, defined as those aged 15 or over who can read and write, was 71% in 2009, up from 58% in 1991 and 38% in 1978.

Rwanda's health profile is dominated by communicable diseases, including malaria, pneumonia, and HIV/AIDS. Prevalence and mortality rates have sharply declined in the past decade but the short supply or unavailability of certain medicines continues to challenge disease management. Kagame's government is seeking to improve this situation as one of the Vision 2020 priorities. It has increased funding, with the health budget up from 3.2% of national expenditure in 1996 to 9.7% in 2008. It also set up training institutes, including the Kigali Health Institute (KHI), and in 2008 effected laws making health insurance mandatory for all individuals; by 2010, over 90% of the population was covered. These policies have contributed to a steady increase in quality of healthcare and improvement in key indicators during Kagame's presidency. In 2010, 91 children died before their fifth birthday for every 1000 live births, down from 163 under five deaths for every 1000 live births in 1990. Prevalence of some diseases is declining, including the elimination of maternal and neonatal tetanus and a sharp reduction in malaria morbidity, mortality rate, and specific lethality. In response to shortages in qualified medical personnel, in 2011 the Rwandan government launched an eight-year US$151.8 million initiative to train medical professionals.

Kagame has garnered praise for the country's response to the ongoing global COVID-19 pandemic. Despite the country having a relatively underdeveloped health care system, Rwanda has one of the lowest infection and mortality rates in the world, and is seen as a success story. Rwanda is currently the only nation in Africa whose residents are permitted to enter the Schengen Area for non essential travel. Rwanda's response has not been without its criticisms, in particular the curbing of civil liberties and individual freedoms. By April 2022. Rwanda was one of the few countries in Africa to have fully vaccinated over 60% of its population against COVID-19.

=== Foreign policy ===
==== Democratic Republic of the Congo ====
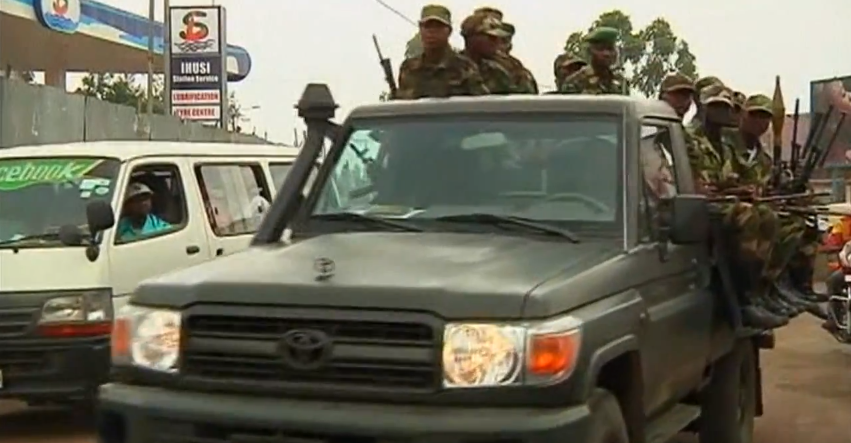
Anti-government rebels from the 23 March (M23) Movement, widely considered to have been supported by Rwanda, during their capture of the provincial capital at Goma in North Kivu in November 2012

The Second Congo War, which began in 1998, was still raging when Kagame assumed the presidency in 2000. Namibia, Angola, Zimbabwe, and Chad had committed troops to the Congolese government side, while Rwanda, Uganda, and Burundi were supporting rebel groups. The rebel group Rally for Congolese Democracy (RCD) had split in 1999 into two factions: the RCD-Goma, supported by Rwanda, and the RCD-Kisangani, which was allied to Uganda. Uganda also supported the Movement for the Liberation of the Congo (MLC), a rebel group from the north. All these rebel groups were at war with Kabila's government in Kinshasa, but they were also increasingly hostile to each other. Various peace meetings had been held, culminating in the July 1999 Lusaka Ceasefire Agreement which was signed by Kabila, Kagame and all the other foreign governments. The rebel groups were not party to the agreement, and fighting continued. The RPA continued to be heavily involved in the Congo War during 2000, fighting battles against the Ugandan army in Kisangani and against Kabila's army in Kasai and Katanga.

In January 2001, Kabila was assassinated inside his palace. His son Joseph was appointed president and immediately began asserting his authority by dismissing his father's cabinet and senior army commanders, assembling a new government, and engaging with the international community. The new government provided impetus for renewed peace negotiations, and in July 2002 a peace agreement was reached between Rwanda, Congo, and the other major participants, in which all foreign troops would withdraw and RCD-Goma would enter a power-sharing transitional government with Joseph Kabila as interim president until elections could be held. Kagame's government announced at the end of 2002 that all uniformed Rwandan troops had left Congolese territory, but this was contradicted by a 2003 report by UN panel of experts. According to this report, the Rwandan army contained a dedicated "Congo desk" which used the armed forces for large-scale illegal appropriation of Congolese resources.

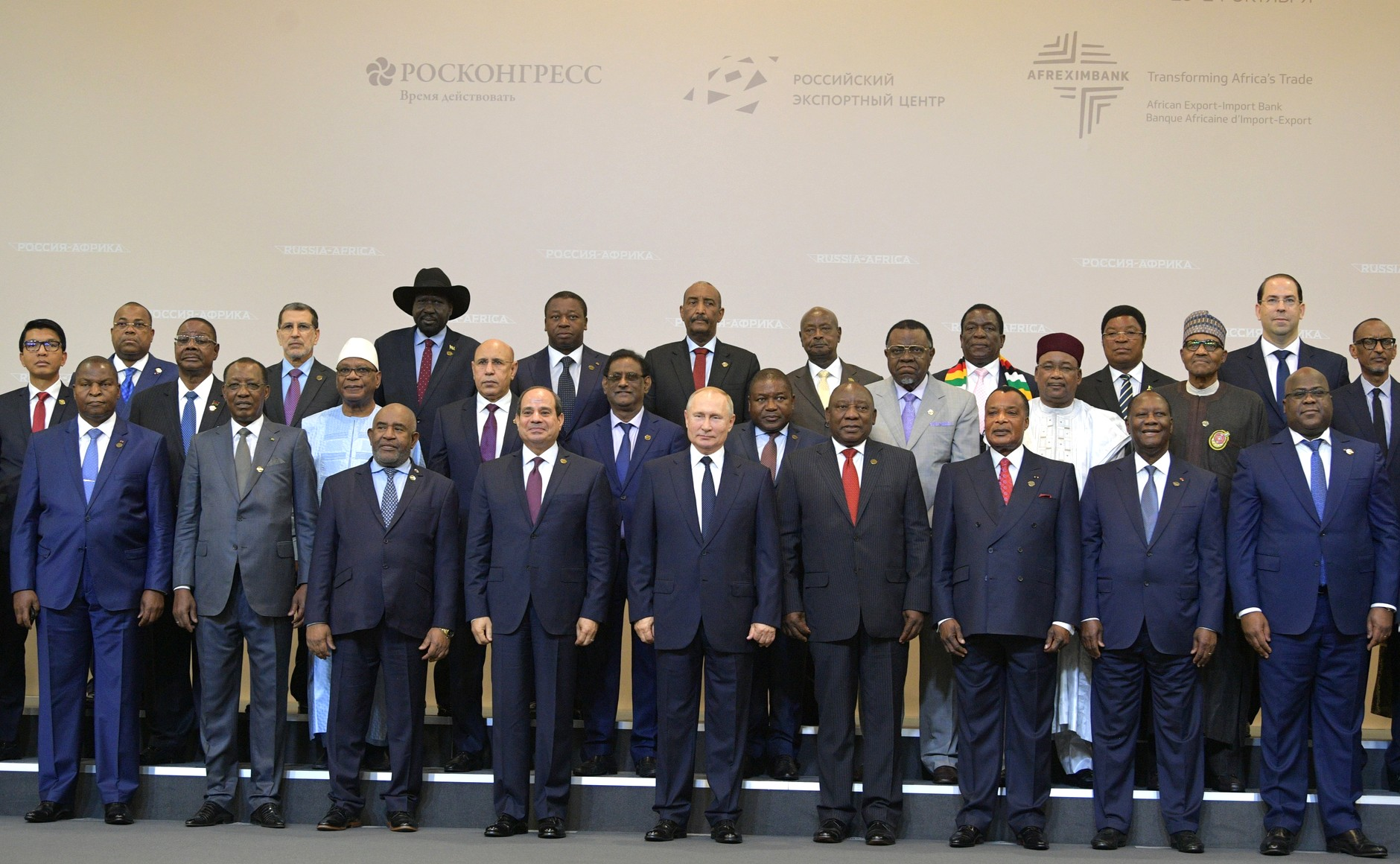
Kagame, DRC president Félix Tshisekedi and other African leaders at the Russia–Africa Summit in Sochi on 24 October 2019

Despite the agreement and subsequent ceasefire, relations between Kagame and the Congolese government remained tense. Kagame blamed the DRC for failing to suppress the Democratic Forces for the Liberation of Rwanda (FDLR), Rwandan Hutu rebels operating in North and South Kivu provinces. Kabila accused Rwanda of using the Hutu as a "pretext for maintaining its control and influence in the area". There has been ongoing conflict in Congo's eastern provinces since 2004, during which Kagame has backed two major insurgencies. This included a major rebellion from 2005 to 2009, led by Congolese Tutsi Laurent Nkunda, as well as the a rebellion carried out by the March 23 Movement (M23) under leader Bosco Ntaganda, beginning in 2012. A leaked United Nations report in 2012 cited Kagame's defence minister James Kabarebe as being effectively the commander of the M23. Relations have improved since 2016, as Kagame held a bilateral meeting with Kabila in Gisenyi. When Félix Tshisekedi was elected DRC president in 2019, Kagame – the AU chairman at the time – unsuccessfully called for an AU investigation into the poll. Despite this, he has developed a close relationship with Tshisekedi since the latter's election, with summits in both Kinshasa and Kigali. As of 2020, Kagame still faces accusations that Rwanda's troops are active within the Kivu provinces. Congolese officials such as Walikale member of parliament Juvénal Munubo, as well as civilians, have reported sighting RDF soldiers in the DRC, but Kagame consistently denies these claims.

On 20 June 2024, Kagame declared to France 24, "we are ready to fight" against the DRC if necessary, while evading questions about Rwanda's military presence in the region. Due to Rwanda's support for the Goma offensive by the M23 rebels, the DRC severed diplomatic ties between the two countries on 26 January 2025. Kagame then claimed that South Africa is not in a position to mediate because South African peacekeepers in the region were working with "genocidal armed groups" that threaten Rwanda.

==== Uganda and the East African Community ====
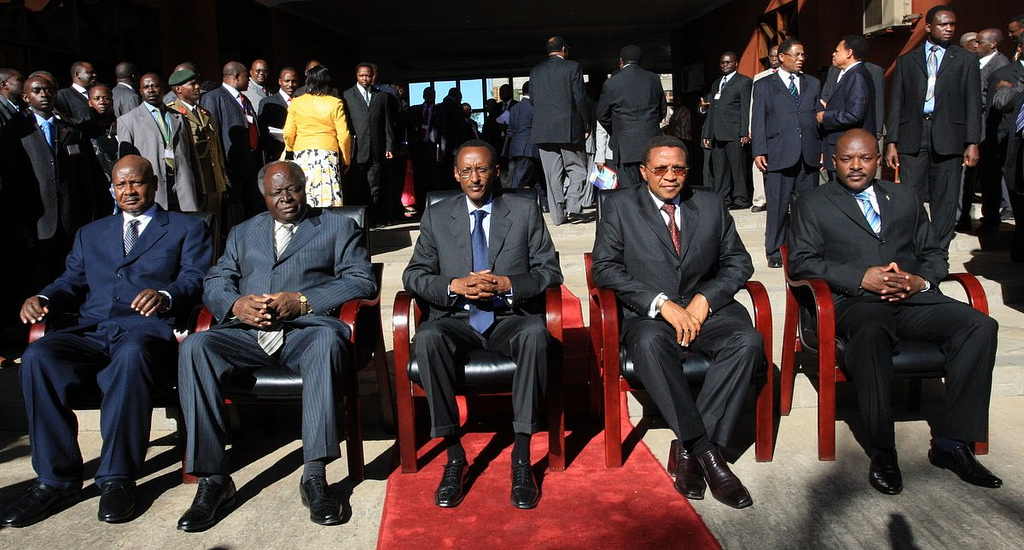
Kagame with the other four East African Community Heads of States in April 2009

Kagame spent most of his childhood and young adult years living in Uganda, and has a personal relationship with President Yoweri Museveni dating back to the late 1970s; they fought together in the Ugandan Bush War, and Kagame was appointed head of military intelligence in Museveni's national army following the NRA victory in 1986. When the RPF soldiers abandoned the Ugandan army and invaded Rwanda in 1990, Museveni did not explicitly support them, but according to Prunier it is likely that he had prior knowledge of the plan. Museveni also allowed the RPF safe passage through Ugandan territory to the Virunga mountains after their early defeats in the war, and revealed in a 1998 heads of state meeting that Uganda had helped the RPF materially during the Rwandan Civil War. Following the RPF victory, the two countries enjoyed a close political and trade relationship.

Rwanda and Uganda were allies during the First Congo War against Zaire, with both countries being instrumental in the setting up of the AFDL and committing troops to the war. The two nations joined forces again at the beginning of the Second Congo War, but relations soured in late 1998 as Museveni and Kagame had very different priorities in fighting the war. In early 1999, the RCD rebel group split into two, with Rwanda and Uganda supporting opposing factions, and in August the Rwandan and Ugandan armies battled each other with heavy artillery in the Congolese city of Kisangani. The two sides fought again in Kisangani in May and June 2000, causing the deaths of 120 soldiers and around 640 Congolese civilians. Relations slowly thawed in the 2000s, and by 2011 the two countries enjoyed a close friendship once more. Further conflict between Kagame and Museveni arose in early 2019, as the two countries conflicted over trade and regional politics. Kagame accused Museveni's government of supporting the FDLR and harassing Rwandan nationals in Uganda, leading Rwanda to set up a blockade of trucks at the border. Museveni accused Rwanda of sending troops into its territory, including an incident in Rukiga district in which a Ugandan citizen was killed. The Rwanda–Uganda border reopened on 31 January 2022.

In 2007, Rwanda joined the East African Community, an intergovernmental organisation for the East Africa region comprising Uganda, Kenya, Tanzania, Burundi, and Rwanda. The country's accession required the signing of various agreements with the other members, including a defence intelligence sharing pact, a customs union, and measures to combat drug trafficking. The countries of the Community established a common market in 2011, and plan further integration, including moves toward political federation. The community has also set up an East African Monetary Institute, which aims to introduce a single currency by 2024.

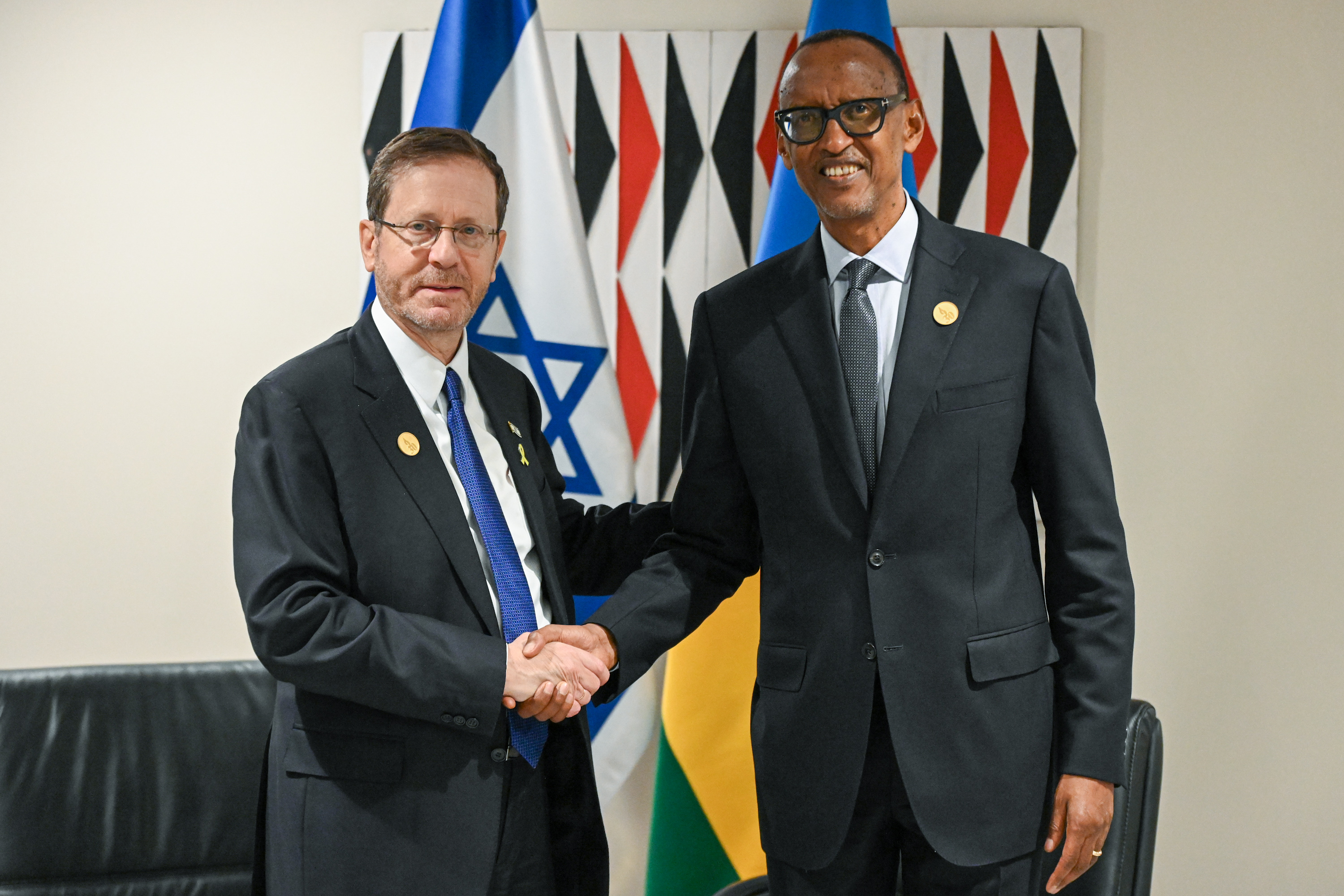
Kagame with Israeli President Isaac Herzog on 7 April 2024

==== France ====
France maintained close ties with President Habyarimana during his years in power, as part of its Françafrique policy. When the RPF launched the Rwandan Civil War in 1990, Habyarimana was immediately granted assistance from the President of France, François Mitterrand. France sent 600 paratroopers, who effectively ran the government's response to the invasion and were instrumental in regaining almost all territory the RPF had gained in the first days of the war. France maintained this military presence throughout the war, engaging Kagame's RPF forces again in February 1993 during the offensive that doubled RPF territory. In the later stages of the 1994 Rwandan genocide, France launched Opération Turquoise, a United Nations mandated mission to create safe humanitarian areas for protection of displaced persons, refugees, and civilians in danger; many Rwandans interpreted it as a mission to protect Hutu from the RPF, including some who had participated in the genocide. The French remained hostile to the RPF, and their presence temporarily stalled Kagame's advance in southwestern Rwanda.

France continued to shun the new RPF government following the end of the genocide and the withdrawal of Opération Turquoise. Diplomatic relations were finally reestablished in January 1995, but remained tense as Rwanda accused France of aiding the genocidaires, while France defended its interventions. In 2006, French judge Jean-Louis Bruguière released a report on the assassination of President Habyarimana which concluded that Kagame had ordered the shooting of the plane. Bruguière subsequently issued arrest warrants for nine of Kagame's close aides. Kagame denied the charges and immediately broke off diplomatic relations with France. Relations began to thaw in 2008, and diplomacy was resumed in late 2009. In 2010, Nicolas Sarkozy became the first French president to visit Rwanda since the genocide, admitting for the first time that France made "grave errors of judgment". Kagame reciprocated with an official visit to Paris in 2011.

==== United States, United Kingdom and the Commonwealth ====
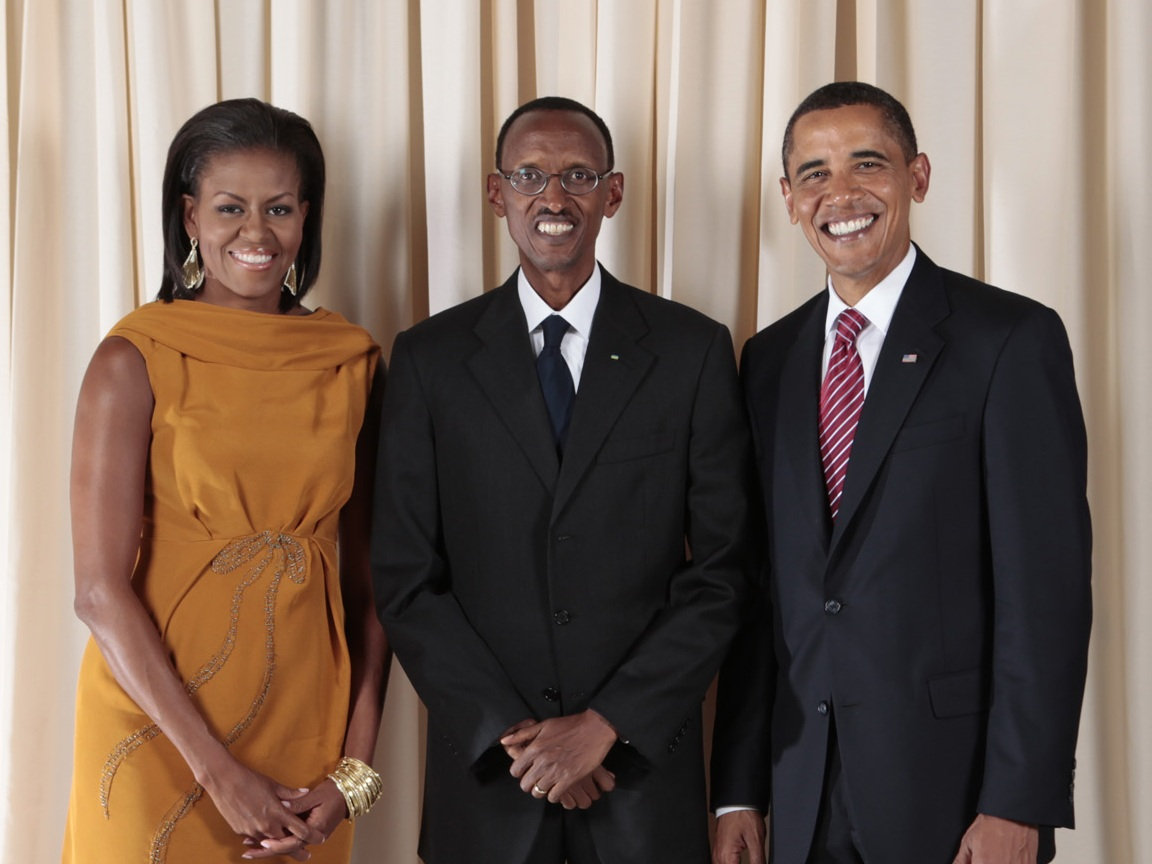
Paul Kagame with United States President Barack Obama and First Lady Michelle Obama in September 2009

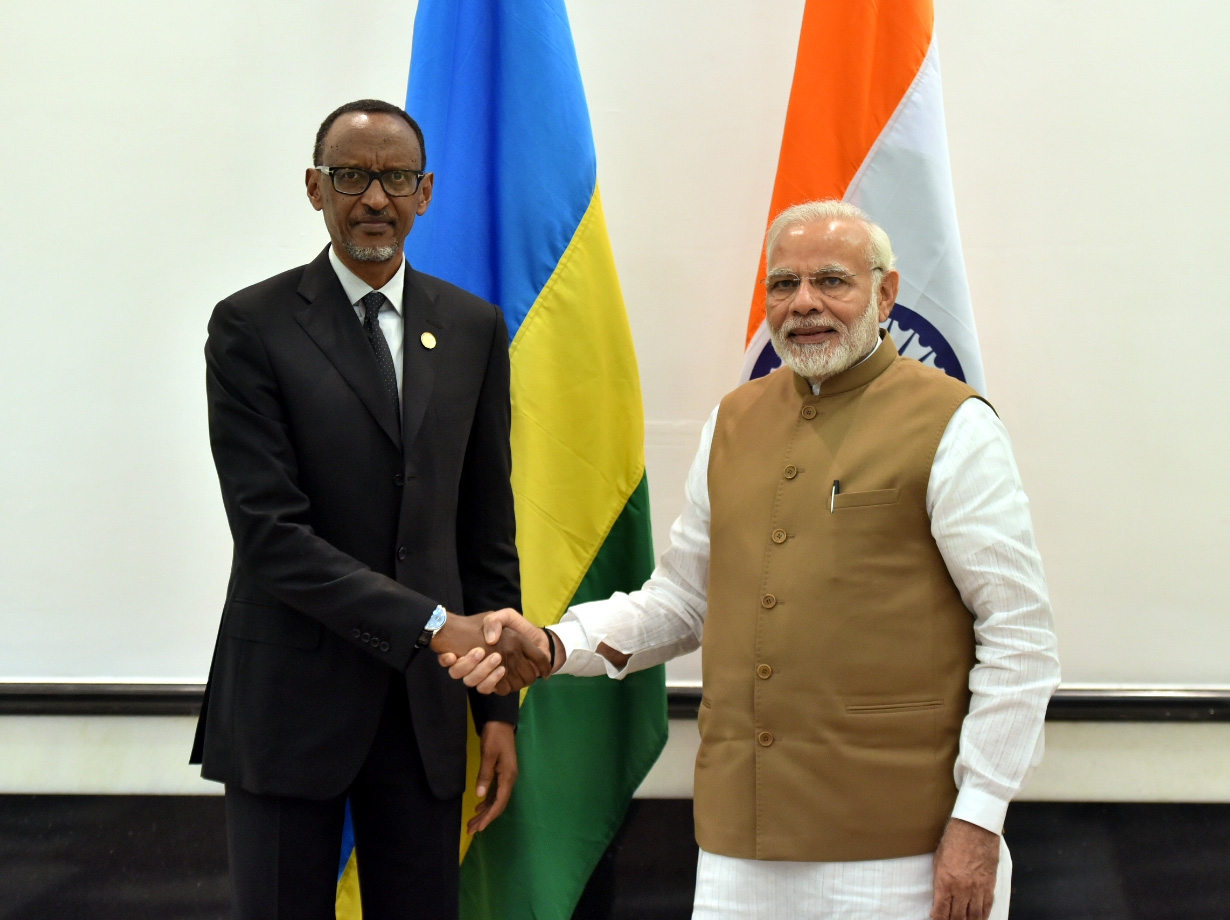
Kagame with Indian Prime Minister Narendra Modi in 2018

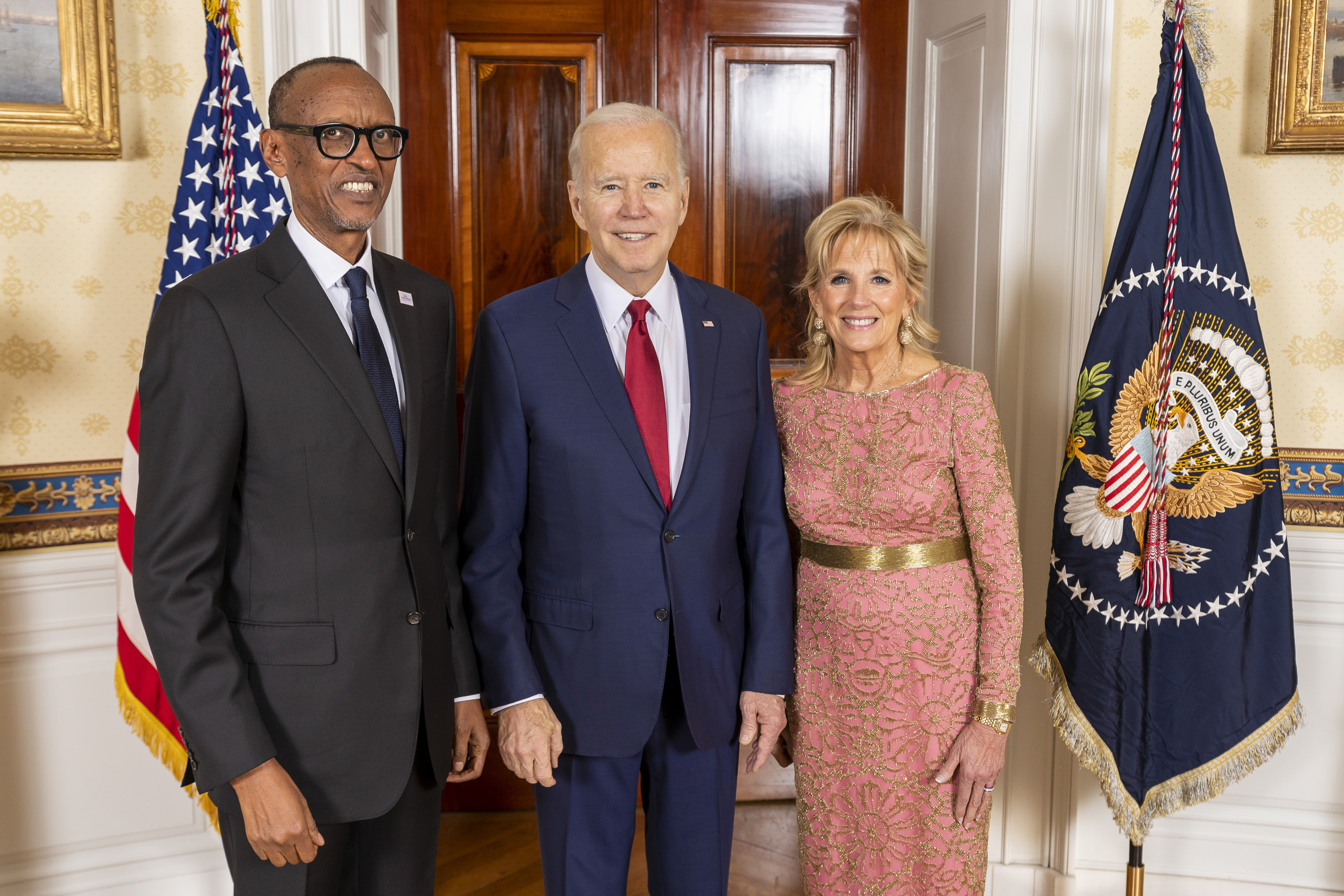
Kagame with US President Joe Biden at the United States–Africa Leaders Summit in 2022

Since the end of the Rwandan genocide in 1994, Rwanda has enjoyed a close relationship with the English speaking world, in particular the United States (US) and United Kingdom (UK). The two countries have been highly supportive of the RPF programme of stabilisation and rebuilding, with the UK donating large sums each year in budget support, and the US providing military aid as well as supporting development projects. As president, Kagame has been critical of the West's lack of response to the genocide, and the UK and US have responded by admitting guilt over the issue: Bill Clinton, who was President of the United States during the genocide, has described his failure to act against the killings as a "personal failure". During the 2000s, Clinton and UK prime minister Tony Blair praised the country's progress under Kagame, citing it as a model recipient for international development funds, and Clinton referred to Kagame as "one of the greatest leaders of our time". Both Clinton and Blair have maintained support for the country beyond the end of their terms of office, Clinton via the Clinton Global Initiative and Blair through his role as an unpaid advisor to the Rwandan government.

As part of his policy of maintaining close relations with English speaking countries, Kagame sought membership of the Commonwealth of Nations, which was granted in 2009. Rwanda was only the second country, after Mozambique, to join the Commonwealth having never had colonial links to the British Empire. Kagame attended the subsequent Commonwealth Heads of Government Meeting in Perth, Australia, addressing the Business Forum. Rwanda also successfully applied for a rotating seat on the United Nations Security Council in 2012, taking over the presidency of that organisation in April 2013.

Kagame's relations with the US and UK came under strain in the early 2010s, following allegations that Rwanda is supporting the M23 rebel movement in Eastern Congo. The UK suspended its budgetary aid programme in 2012, freezing a £21 million donation. Other European nations such as Germany also suspended general budgetary support from 2008 onwards. Payments by these countries were gradually restored from 2013, but took the form of sector budgetary support and support for specific programmes. The US also froze some of its military aid programme for Rwanda in 2012, although it stopped short of suspending aid altogether. By 2020, the US remained supportive of Kagame's government and was Rwanda's largest bilateral donor.

==== China and moves towards self-sufficiency ====
China has been investing in Rwandan infrastructure since 1971, with early projects including hospitals in Kibungo and Masaka. Under Kagame's presidency, trade between the two countries has grown rapidly. The volume of trade increased five-fold between 2005 and 2009, and it doubled again in the following three years, being worth US$160 million in 2012. Projects completed include the renovation of the Kigali road network, funded using a Chinese government loan and undertaken by China Road and Bridge Corporation; the Kigali City Tower, which was built by China Civil Engineering Construction; and a pay television service operated by Star Media.

Kagame has been vocal in his praise of China and its model for relations with Africa, saying in a 2009 interview that "the Chinese bring what Africa needs: investment and money for governments and companies". This is in contrast to Western countries, whom Kagame accuses of focussing too heavily on giving aid to the continent rather than building a trading relationship; he also believes that they keep African products out of the world marketplace by the use of high tariffs. China does not openly involve itself in the domestic affairs of the countries with which it trades, hence has not followed the West in criticising Kagame's alleged involvement in the war in the Congo.

Kagame's ultimate goal in international relations is to shift Rwanda from a country dependent on donor aid and loans towards self-sufficiency, trading with other countries on an equal footing. In a 2009 article, Kagame wrote that "the primary purpose of aid should ultimately be to work itself out", and should therefore focus on self-sufficiency and building private sector development. Kagame cited an example of donor countries providing free fertilisers to farmers; he believes this to be wrong because it undercuts local fertiliser businesses, preventing them from growing and becoming competitive. In 2012, Kagame launched the Agaciro Development Fund, following proposals made at a national dialogue session in 2011. Agaciro is a solidarity fund whose goal is to provide development finance sourced within Rwanda, supplementing aid already received from overseas. The fund invites contributions from Rwandan citizens, within the country and in the diaspora, as well as private companies and "friends of Rwanda". The fund will allocate its funds based on consultations with the populace, as well as financing projects contributing to the Vision 2020 programme.

== Assassinations ==
Throughout Kagame's tenure as vice president and president, he has been linked with murders and disappearances of political opponents, both in Rwanda and abroad. In a 2014 report titled "Repression Across Borders", Human Rights Watch documents at least 10 cases involving attacks or threats against critics outside Rwanda since the late 1990s, citing their criticism of the Rwandan government, the RPF or Kagame. Examples include the killing of Sendashonga in 1998, the assassination attempts against Nyamwasa in South Africa, as well as the murder of former intelligence chief Patrick Karegeya in South Africa on 31 December 2013. Speaking about Karegeya's killing, Kagame spoke of his approval, saying "whoever betrays the country will pay the price, I assure you". In 2015, a former Rwandan military officer testified before the U.S. Congress that the Rwandan government had offered him $1 million to assassinate Karegeya as well as Kagame critic General Kayumba Nyamwasa. After his testimony, this officer himself faced threats in Belgium as did a Canadian journalist. In December 2017, a South African court found that the Rwandan government continued to plot the assassination of its critics overseas.

Paul Kagame has used the Rwandan intelligence service, NISS, to spy on, pursue, and harass political opponents.

One target was the circle surrounding the imprisoned "Hotel Rwanda" acter Paul Rusesabagina, including his daughter, Carine Kanimba, and his nephew. Opposition figures living in exile such as former intelligence chief Kayumba Nyamwasa, who resides in South Africa were also placed under surveillance. To this end, Rwanda purchased the spyware "Pegasus" from the Israeli firm NSO Group.

== Chairperson of the African Union ==
Kagame was Chairperson of the African Union from 28 January 2018 to 10 February 2019. As Chair, Kagame promoted the Single African Air Transport Market (SAATM) and the African Continental Free Trade Area. The proposed Continental Free Trade Area was signed on 21 March 2018 by 44 of the 55 AU nations. By the time he left office in February 2019, the Continental Free Trade had already been ratified by 19 of the 22 nations needed for it to officially go into effect. Kagame also pushed through a reform of African Union structures in an effort to improve their effectiveness and make them financially sustainable.

== Public image and personality ==
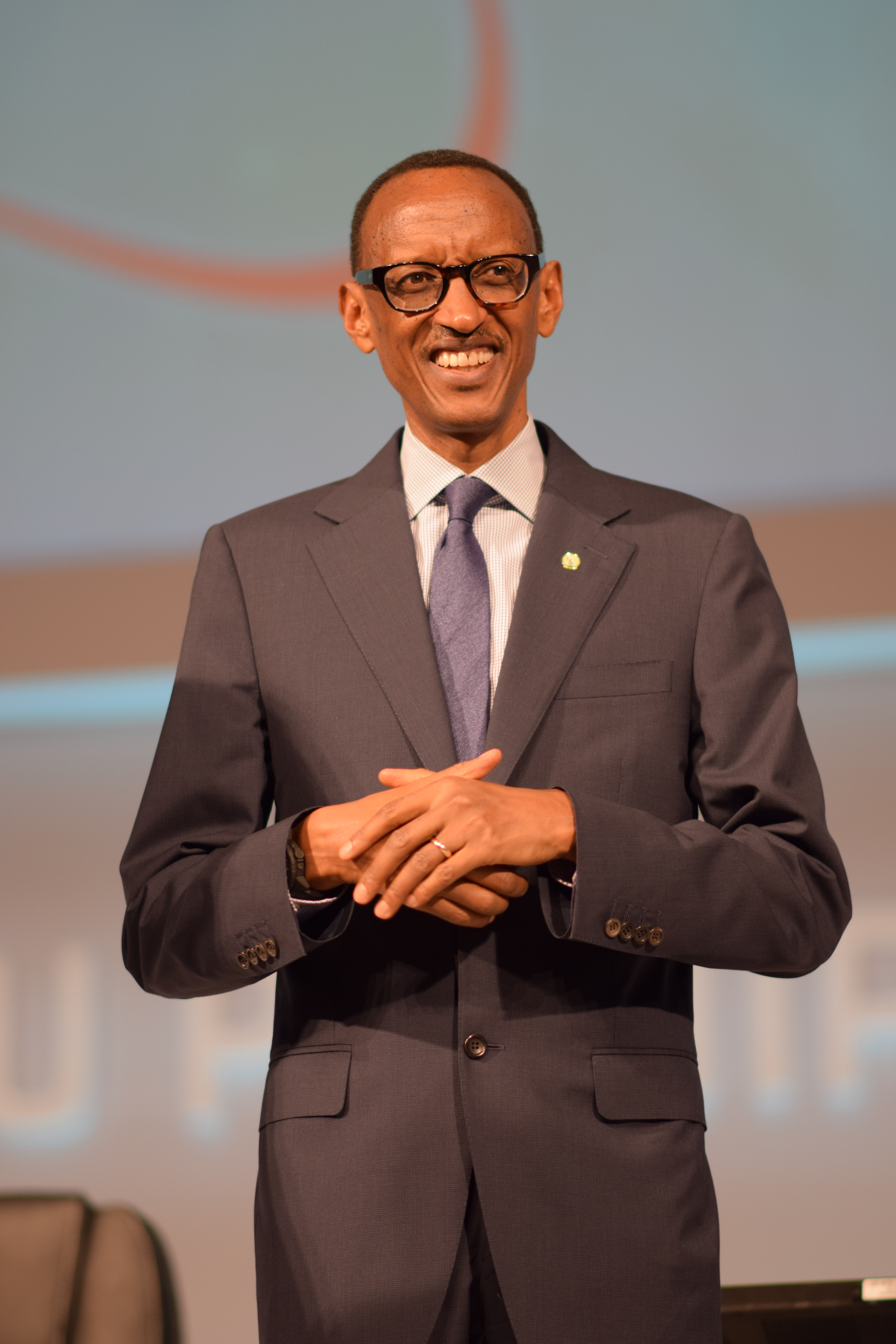
Kagame visited the 2014 ITU Plenipotentiary conference in Busan, South Korea.

Views on his leadership vary widely among international scholars and journalists. According to political scientist Alexander Dukalskis, Kagame has been adept in developing a sophisticated positive image of Rwanda abroad. Dukalskis says that to suppress negative information, the Kagame regime has curtailed access to academics and journalists, and threatened and assassinated critics of the regime. Others, such as Philip Gourevitch, author of the 1998 book We Wish to Inform You That Tomorrow We Will Be Killed with Our Families, focus on his achievements in ending the genocide after the international community failed to do so, as well as the reconciliation, economic growth, foreign investment, improved public health and education. This is countered by authors such as Judi Rever, who highlight war crimes committed by the RPF before, during, and after the 1994 genocide, the effects of the civil war, assassinations of opponents and the totalitarianism of his regime. In Rethinking the Rwandan Narrative for the 25th Anniversary, Gerald Caplan states that a new narrative is required to reconcile these conflicting viewpoints, incorporating aspects from both points of view and "striking the proper balance between the old and the newly revised".

In Rwanda, Kagame's RPF is seen as a Tutsi-dominated party, and in the years following the 1994 genocide, it was deeply unpopular with the Hutu, who constitute 85% of the population. Approximately two million Hutu lived as refugees in neighbouring countries until 1996, when Kagame forced them to return home. Many Hutu also supported the late 1990s cross-border insurgency against Kagame by defeated forces of the former regime. By 1999, the RPF had weakened the insurgents and Tutsi and Hutu began living together peacefully in the northwest. Kayumba Nyamwasa, at the time still part of the Rwandan army, said that "the mood had changed", attributing a shift in Hutu attitude to a shift in the "balance of forces in the country", with the genocidaires having "no chance of returning to power". As of 2021, with a lack of free speech in Rwanda, and elections which are generally regarded as lacking freedom and fairness, Kagame's popularity among the Rwandan population is unknown. Journalists Jason Burke of The Guardian and Al Jazeera's Rashid Abdallah describe the president as "authentically popular in Rwanda" and as enjoying "overwhelming public support" respectively. British journalist and author Michela Wrong and Filip Reyntjens disagree, with Wrong saying that "the level of invective Kagame dedicates to the Rwanda National Congress, the amount of energy he has expended trying to get Uganda and South Africa to expel or extradite or close down these players, suggests he sees them as a real threat".

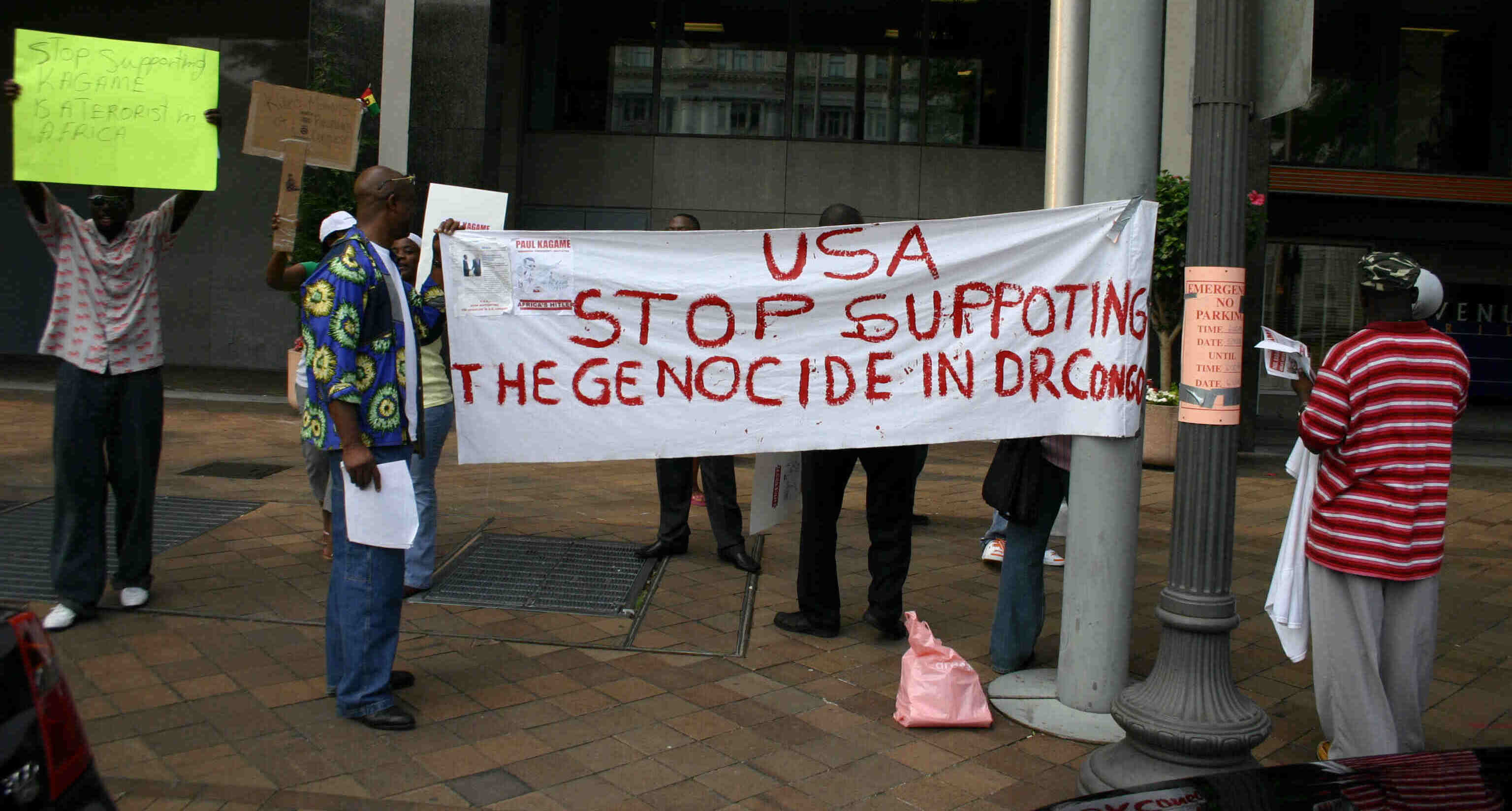
Protests against Kagame during his May 2006 visit to the White House. The banner in the center says the United States should "stop supporting the genocide in [the] DR Congo".

Kagame's image among foreign leaders was very positive until the late 2000s. He was credited with ending the genocide, bringing peace and security to Rwanda, and achieving development. Since 2010, the international community has increasingly criticized Kagame following a leaked United Nations report alleging Rwanda's support for the rebel M23 movement in Congo. In 2012, the United Kingdom, Germany, the Netherlands and several other countries suspended programmes of budget support to Rwanda, with many redirecting their aid to project-based assistance.

Under Kagame's leadership, Rwanda has faced persistent and severe restrictions on human rights and freedom of speech, with authorities maintaining tight control over expression through arbitrary arrests, prosecutions for “genocide ideology” or “divisionism,” and transnational repression targeting critics abroad. Human Rights Watch described the July 2024 presidential election, in which Kagame won 99.15 percent of the vote, as taking place against a backdrop of widespread repression. Allegations of ill-treatment of detainees continued, and in April 2024 several prison officials and prisoners were convicted of murder and assault of prisoners at Rubavu prison.

External videos
- Presentation by Kinzer on A Thousand Hills, June 18, 2008, C-SPAN

Describing Kagame's personality, Roméo Dallaire has written that he has a "studious air that didn't quite disguise his hawk-like intensity". American journalist Stephen Kinzer, who wrote the biography A Thousand Hills: Rwanda's Rebirth and the Man Who Dreamed It in collaboration with Kagame himself, describes him as "one of the most intriguing leaders in Africa". Despite praising Kagame's leadership skills, Kinzer also cites a personality of "chronic impatience, barely suppressed anger, and impulsive scorn for critics". In an interview with the Daily Telegraph's Richard Grant, Kagame said that he sleeps for only four hours per night, devoting the remainder of his day to work, exercise, family, and reading academic texts and foreign newspapers. When asked about his reputation for physically beating his subordinates by journalist Jeffrey Gettleman, Kagame said, "I can be very tough, I can make mistakes like that".

Kagame has received many honours and accolades during his presidency. These include honorary degrees and medals from several Western universities, as well as the highest awards bestowed by the countries of Liberia and Benin. The Council for East and Central Africa Football Associations football tournament has been named the Kagame Interclub Cup since 2002, due to Kagame's sponsorship of the event.

== Personal life ==
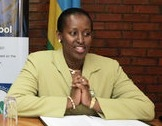
Jeannette Kagame, Paul Kagame's wife

Kagame married Jeannette Nyiramongi, a Tutsi exile living in Nairobi, Kenya, in Uganda on 10 June 1989. Kagame had asked his relatives to suggest a suitable marriage and they recommended Nyiramongi. Kagame travelled to Nairobi and introduced himself, persuading her to visit him in Uganda. Nyiramongi was familiar with the RPF and its goal of returning refugees to Rwanda. She held Kagame in high regard. The couple have four children.

His daughter, Ange Kagame Ndengeyingoma, completed her education abroad and was absent from the public eye for most of her childhood due to security and privacy reasons. She attended Dana Hall School, a private preparatory school located in Wellesley, Massachusetts in the United States. She attended Smith College where she majored in political science with a minor in African studies. She also holds a master's degree in international affairs from Columbia University.

Kagame can speak three languages, English, Kinyarwanda, and French, and is a supporter of Arsenal F.C. He is Catholic and teetotal.

== Honours ==
- Benin:
  - Grand Cross of the National Order of Benin (2010)
- Burkina Faso:
  - Grand Cross of the Ordre de l'Étalon, formerly National Order of Burkina Faso (2019)
- Central African Republic:
  - Grand Cross of the Order of Reconnaissance of Central African (2019)
- Guinea:
  - Grand Cross of the National Order of Merit (2016)
- Guinea-Bissau:
  - Recipient of the Medal of Amílcar Cabral (20 June 2024)
- Ivory Coast
  - Grand Cross of the National Order of the Ivory Coast (2018)
- Morocco:
  - Collar of the Order of Muhammad (2016)
- Liberia:
  - Grand Cordon of the Order of the Pioneers of Liberia (2009)
- Serbia:
  - Second Class of the Order of the Republic of Serbia (2016)
- Uganda:
  - Most Excellent Order of the Pearl of Africa: Grand Master (2012)
- La Francophonie:
  - Grand Cross of the Order of La Pléiade (2022)

== See also ==
- History of Rwanda
- Politics of Rwanda

== Sources ==
- Abdallah, Rashid (7 October 2019). "Paul Kagame should not fear opposition". Al Jazeera. Archived from the original on 18 July 2024.
- Adams, Tim (19 July 2009). "Starbucks founder spreads gospel of hope in Rwanda". The Guardian. London. Archived from the original on 15 December 2020.
- Agaciro Development Fund (I). "Agaciro Development Fund" (PDF). Archived from the original (PDF) on 29 January 2013.
- Agaciro Development Fund (II). "Background". Archived from the original on 16 January 2013.
- Agence France-Presse (14 July 2015). "Rwanda MPs approve third term for Paul Kagame". The Daily Nation. Nairobi. Archived from the original on 26 August 2020.
- Agence France-Presse (10 February 2019). "As Kagame Steps Down, Egypt Takes Helm at African Union". Voice of America. Archived from the original on 28 April 2019.
- Al Jazeera (I) (7 August 2010). "Rwanda presidential campaign ends – Africa". Archived from the original on 4 February 2011.
- Al Jazeera (II) (10 August 2010). "Rwanda's Kagame set for big win – Africa". Archived from the original on 22 February 2011.
- Al Jazeera (III) (20 September 2007). "Rwanda blames DR Congo for violence". Archived from the original on 13 May 2011.
- Al Jazeera (IV) (17 November 2015). "Rwandan Senate votes to allow third term for Kagame". Archived from the original on 21 September 2020.
- Amnesty International (I) (22 April 2003). "Rwanda: Escalating repression against political opposition". Archived from the original on 15 December 2020.
- Ansoms, An; Rostagno, Donatella (1 September 2012). "Rwanda's Vision 2020 halfway through: what the eye does not see". Review of African Political Economy. 39 (133): 427–450. doi:10.1080/03056244.2012.710836. hdl:10.1080/03056244.2012.710836. ISSN 0305-6244. S2CID 154937703.
- Appiah, Anthony; Gates, Henry Louis (2010). Encyclopedia of Africa, Volume 1 (illustrated ed.). Oxford: Oxford University Press. ISBN 978-0-19-533770-9. Archived from the original on 11 January 2023.
- Arab News (21 March 2018). "44 African nations sign pact establishing free trade area". Archived from the original on 26 May 2018.
- Armbruster, Stefan (18 February 2003). "Rwanda denies DRC plundering". BBC News. Archived from the original on 9 June 2020.
- Asiimwe, Arthur (6 April 2007). "Rwanda's ex-president freed from prison". Archived from the original on 21 January 2021.
- Asiimwe, Bosco (26 August 2010). "$200m project launched in Kigali". The New Times. Kigali. Archived from the original on 20 March 2014.
- Associated Press (I) (7 April 1981). "Guerrillas Ambush Troops in Uganda". Observer–Reporter. Washington, Penn. Archived from the original on 18 June 2020.
- Associated Press (II) (20 January 2010). "Review of Congo war halves death toll". NBC News. Archived from the original on 23 October 2020.
- Australian Associated Press (7 April 2004). "We did our best in Rwanda: France". The Age.
- Australian War Memorial. "United Nations Assistance Mission for Rwanda (UNAMIR)". War history. Archived from the original on 1 July 2013.
- Bariyo, Nicholas (29 September 2020). "Rwanda's Aggressive Approach to Covid Wins Plaudits—and Warnings". Wall Street Journal. Archived from the original on 16 December 2020.
- BBC News (I) (12 January 2010). "Hutus 'killed Rwanda President Juvenal Habyarimana'". Archived from the original on 1 June 2013.
- BBC News (II). "Democratic Republic of Congo profile". Archived from the original on 20 January 2021.
- BBC News (III) (23 March 2000). "Rwandan president quits". Archived from the original on 14 August 2017.
- BBC News (IV) (17 April 2000). "Kagame elected Rwandan president". Archived from the original on 16 October 2020.
- BBC News (V) (22 April 2000). "Rwanda's Kagame sworn in". Archived from the original on 1 August 2020.
- BBC News (VI) (6 April 2007). "Rwanda ex-leader freed from jail". Archived from the original on 15 December 2020.
- BBC News (VII) (26 May 2003). "Rwanda votes on constitution". Archived from the original on 22 October 2020.
- BBC News (VIII) (4 July 2003). "Rwanda sets election date". Archived from the original on 18 July 2024.
- BBC News (IX) (9 May 2003). "Rwanda denies clampdown". Archived from the original on 6 June 2004.
- BBC News (X) (10 August 2003). "Rwanda opposition launches campaign". Archived from the original on 11 May 2020.
- BBC News (XI) (23 November 2006). "France issues Rwanda warrants". Archived from the original on 18 February 2021.
- BBC News (XII) (24 November 2006). "Rwanda cuts relations with France". Archived from the original on 26 August 2020.
- BBC News (XIII) (12 September 2011). "Rwanda's Kagame pays 'reconciliation visit' to France". Archived from the original on 15 December 2020.
- BBC News (XIV) (17 October 2012). "Rwanda defence chief leads DR Congo rebels, UN report says". Archived from the original on 3 November 2012.
- BBC News (XV) (11 October 2009). "China praised for African links". Archived from the original on 15 December 2020.
- BBC News (XVI) (30 November 2012). "UK stops £21m aid payment to Rwanda". Archived from the original on 15 December 2020.
- BBC News (XVII) (5 June 2014). "Rwanda 'protecting M23 DR Congo rebels'". Archived from the original on 18 November 2023.
- BBC News (XVIII) (9 December 2015). "Paul Kagame's third term: Rwanda referendum on 18 December". Archived from the original on 23 November 2017.
- BBC News (XIX) (15 September 2018). "Victoire Ingabire: Rwanda frees 2,000 people including opposition figure".
- Beaubien, Jason (15 July 2020). "Why Rwanda Is Doing Better Than Ohio When It Comes To Controlling COVID-19". NPR. Archived from the original on 5 December 2020.
- Beaumont, Peter (18 July 2010). "Deadly attacks on Rwandan opposition spark warning by UN". The Guardian. Archived from the original on 14 August 2017.
- Beaver County Times (26 August 2003). "Incumbent Claims Victory". Archived from the original on 18 June 2020.
- Birakwate, Bruno (26 March 2012). "Google Maps to promote Rwanda's tourism". Rwanda Focus.
- Bonner, Raymond (7 September 1994). "Rwanda's Leaders Vow to Build a Multiparty State for Both Hutu and Tutsi". The New York Times. New York, N.Y. Archived from the original on 19 January 2021.
- Braquehais, Stéphanie; Norris-Trent, Catherine (8 August 2010). "Incumbent Kagame poised to win re-election". France 24.
- Brittain, Victoria (5 April 1999). "Rwanda makes its way to regeneration". The Guardian. London. Archived from the original on 6 May 2016.
- Burke, Jason (5 August 2017). "Paul Kagame re-elected president with 99% of vote in Rwanda election". The Guardian. Archived from the original on 24 March 2020.
- Bruguière, Jean-Louis (17 November 2006). "Report" (PDF). Paris Court of Serious Claims (in French). Archived from the original (PDF) on 16 December 2006.
- Butera, Saul (12 July 2011). "Star Media to cover the whole country by 2012". The New Times. Kigali. Archived from the original on 20 March 2014.
- Byman, Daniel; Chalk, Peter; Hoffman, Bruce; Rosenau, William; Brannan, David (2001). Trends in Outside Support for Insurgent Movements. Rand Corporation. ISBN 978-0-8330-3232-4. Archived from the original on 16 January 2024.
- Caplan, Gerald (2018). "Rethinking the Rwandan Narrative for the 25th Anniversary". Genocide Studies International. 12 (2): 152–190. doi:10.3138/gsi.12.2.03. S2CID 167056377.
- Cassimon, Danny; Engelen, Peter-Jan; Reyntjens, Filip (2013). "Rwanda's involvement in Eastern DRC: A criminal real options approach". Crime, Law and Social Change. 59 (1): 39–62. doi:10.1007/s10611-012-9397-7. hdl:20.500.12733/1577015.
- Center for Defense Information (CDI). "The World At War – January 1, 1998". The Defense Monitor. 27 (1).
- Central Intelligence Agency (CIA). "Rwanda". The World Factbook. Archived from the original on 9 January 2021.
- Cheeseman, Nic; Klaas, Brian (2018). How to Rig an Election. Yale University Press. ISBN 978-0-300-23521-0.
- China Road and Bridge Corporation (21 August 2007). "CRBC Signed Rwandan Kigali City Road Contract".
- Chrétien, Jean-Pierre (2003). The Great Lakes of Africa: Two Thousand Years of History. Cambridge, Mass.: MIT Press. ISBN 978-1-890951-34-4. Archived from the original on 11 January 2023.
- Columbia University World Leaders Forum. "Paul Kagame". Archived from the original on 21 December 2012.
- Commission Juridique Et Constitutionnelle Du Rwanda (CJCR) (26 May 2003). "Constitution of the Republic of Rwanda". Archived from the original on 25 March 2009.
- Committee to Protect Journalists (CPJ) (11 March 2004). "Attacks on the Press 2003: Rwanda". Archived from the original on 7 March 2013.
- Congo Forum (23 September 2016). "L'Oeil du Patriote – Le Professeur Filip Reytjens persiste et signe : Paul Kagame est le plus grand criminel en fonction!" (in French). Archived from the original on 20 October 2021.
- Dallaire, Roméo (2005). Shake Hands with the Devil: The Failure of Humanity in Rwanda. London: Arrow. ISBN 978-0-09-947893-5.
- Davies, Karin (17 May 1998). "Ex-Rwandan Minister Killed in Kenya". Associated Press.
- Delmas, Père Léon (1950). Généalogie de la noblesse du Rwanda (les Batutsi). Kabgayi.
- Department of State, United States of America (I) (2012). "Background Note: Rwanda". Background Notes. Archived from the original on 24 November 2020.
- Department of State, United States of America (II) (2017). "2017 Country Reports on Human Rights Practices: Rwanda" (PDF). p. 1. Archived (PDF) from the original on 18 July 2024.
- Department of State, United States of America (III) (5 August 2017). "Presidential Election in Rwanda". Archived from the original on 20 August 2017.
- Department of State, United States of America (IV) (2018). "Rwanda 2018 Human Rights Report". Archived from the original on 24 May 2021 – via United States Department of Justice.
- Department of State, United States of America (V). "Rwanda". Archived from the original on 13 December 2020.
- Department of State, United States of America (VI) (30 January 1995). "U.S. Department of State Country Report on Human Rights Practices 1994 – Rwanda". Refworld. Archived from the original on 15 September 2023.
- Des Forges, Alison (1999). Leave None to Tell the Story: Genocide in Rwanda. Human Rights Watch. ISBN 978-1-56432-171-8. Archived from the original on 18 July 2024.
- Dukalskis, Alexander (2021). Making the World Safe for Dictatorship. Oxford University Press. ISBN 978-0-19-752013-0. Archived from the original on 18 July 2024.
- Deutsche Welle (3 August 2017). "Elections a safe bet for Rwanda's President Paul Kagame". Deutsche Welle.
- Deutsche Welle (17 April 2020). "20 years under Rwanda's 'benevolent dictator' Paul Kagame". Deutsche Welle.
- "The Effects of the Exit From Budget Support In Rwanda" (PDF). German Institute for Development Evaluation (DEval). February 2008. Archived from the original (PDF) on 1 December 2020.
- East African Community (I). "The Future of East African Integration". Office of the Secretary General. Archived from the original on 13 March 2013.
- East African Community (II) (27 January 2020). "Plans to put in place East African single currency by 2024 well underway". Archived from the original on 18 July 2024.
- Economist (29 May 2003). "Rwanda's new constitution: The fear of majority rule". Archived from the original on 14 August 2017.
- Fassbender, Bardo (2011). Securing Human Rights?: Achievements and Challenges of the UN Security Council. Oxford: Oxford University Press. ISBN 978-0-19-964149-9. Archived from the original on 17 January 2023.
- Ford, Liz (30 November 2012). "UK withholds aid to Rwanda in light of Congo DRC allegations". The Guardian. London. Archived from the original on 15 December 2020.
- ForeignAssistance.gov (2013). "Rwanda". Government of the United States. Archived from the original on 6 March 2013.
- Freedom House (2011). "Freedom in the World: Rwanda". Archived from the original on 20 March 2014.
- French, Howard W. (9 November 1994). "Tense Times for France-Africa Tie". The New York Times. Archived from the original on 16 December 2020.
- Garrett, Laurie (2018). "Rwanda: not the official narrative". The Lancet. 392 (10151): 909–912. doi:10.1016/S0140-6736(18)32124-X. S2CID 54384867.
- Gasamagera, Wellars (22 June 2007). "The Constitution Making Process in Rwanda: Lessons to be Learned" (PDF). 7th Global Forum for Reinventing Government, Vienna, Austria, 26–29 June 2007. United Nations. Archived from the original (PDF) on 12 July 2019.
- Gasore, Ben (15 May 2013). "Rwanda, China strengthen ties". The New Times. Kigali. Archived from the original on 20 March 2014.
- Gettleman, Jeffrey; Kron, Josh (8 August 2010). "Doubts Rise in Rwanda as Election Is Held (Published 2010)". The New York Times. Archived from the original on 12 August 2021.
- Gourevitch, Philip (2000). We Wish To Inform You That Tomorrow We Will Be Killed With Our Families (Reprint ed.). London; New York, N.Y.: Picador. ISBN 978-0-330-37120-9. Archived from the original on 11 January 2023.
- Global Witness (2013). "Putting principles into practice: Risks and opportunities for conflict-free sourcing in eastern Congo" (PDF). Archived from the original (PDF) on 22 February 2017.
- Government of Rwanda (2009). "Chronology of Events Leading to Liberation". Official Website of the Government of Rwanda. Archived from the original on 7 March 2012.
- Grant, Richard (22 July 2010). "Paul Kagame: Rwanda's redeemer or ruthless dictator?". The Daily Telegraph. London. Archived from the original on 13 December 2020.
- Gras, Romain (2 March 2020). "Rwanda and the DRC get closer despite lingering tensions". The Africa Report. Archived from the original on 3 September 2023.
- Great Lakes Voice (12 January 2010). "Kagame says Gen Kayumba Nyamwasa, Col Karegyeya masterminds of Kigali grenade attack". Archived from the original on 20 March 2014.
- Guichaoua, André (2020). "Counting the Rwandan Victims of War and Genocide: Concluding Reflections". Journal of Genocide Research. 22 (1): 125–141. doi:10.1080/14623528.2019.1703329. S2CID 213471539.
- Heuler, Hilary (12 December 2011). "Uganda, Rwanda Move to Mend Troubled Relations". Voice of America News. Archived from the original on 11 February 2012.
- Hranjski, Hrvoje (2 February 1999). "5 years later, African panel will investigate Rwandan genocide". Spartanburg Herald-Journal. Archived from the original on 18 July 2024.
- Human Rights Watch (I) (June 2005). The Curse of Gold. Human Rights Watch. IX. ISBN 9781564323323. Archived from the original on 20 April 2021.
- Human Rights Watch (II) (2 August 2010). "The Rwandan Patriotic Front". Archived from the original on 25 October 2014.
- Human Rights Watch (III) (28 January 2014). "Rwanda: Repression Across Borders". Archived from the original on 21 January 2019.
- Human Rights Watch (IV) (18 August 2017). "Rwanda: Politically Closed Elections". Archived from the original on 22 February 2019.
- Immigration and Refugee Board of Canada (5 May 2006). "Rwanda: Treatment by government authorities of Faustin Twagiramungu and supporters of his candidacy during the presidential election campaign in August 2003 (August 2003 – April 2006)". Refworld. RWA101284.FE. Archived from the original on 18 July 2024.
- International Crisis Group (23 January 2020). "Averting Proxy Wars in the Eastern DR Congo and Great Lakes". Archived from the original on 3 September 2023.
- International Justice Resource Center (12 December 2017). "African Court Holds Rwanda Violated Victoire Ingabire's Freedom of Expression". Archived from the original on 18 July 2024.
- IRIN (I) (30 March 2000). "Rwanda: Court confirms Kagame as acting president". Archived from the original on 21 March 2014.
- IRIN (II) (19 May 2003). "Rwanda: Cabinet approves ban on main opposition party". Archived from the original on 20 March 2014.
- IRIN (III) (19 May 2003). "Rwanda: Main opposition candidate returns after years in exile".
- IRIN (IV) (3 September 2003). "Rwanda: Supreme Court confirms Kagame winner of presidential elections". Archived from the original on 21 March 2014.
- IRIN (V) (22 April 2002). "Rwanda: Ex-Pres Bizimungu arrested for illegal political activity". Archived from the original on 20 March 2014.
- Kagame, Paul (2 November 2009). "Why Africa welcomes the Chinese". The Guardian. Archived from the original on 16 December 2020.
- Kagame, Paul (13 September 2011). "Speech by H.E Paul Kagame at the MEDEF business breakfast". paulkagame.com. Archived from the original on 15 December 2020.
- Kainerugaba, Muhoozi (2010). Battles of the Ugandan Resistance: A Tradition of Maneuver. Kampala: Fountain Publishers. ISBN 978-9970-25-032-5. Archived from the original on 18 July 2024.
- Kanyesigye, Frank (27 May 2012). "Tracking Rwanda's ICT ambitions". The New Times. Archived from the original on 28 May 2012.
- Kasozi, A. (1994). Social Origins of Violence in Uganda, 1964–1985. Montreal: McGill-Queen's Press. ISBN 978-0-7735-6487-9. Archived from the original on 24 February 2024.
- Katusiime, Ian (23 August 2021). "Uganda Rwanda relations : The forgotten feud awakens?". The Independent. Archived from the original on 29 August 2021.
- Kigali Health Institute (KHI) (22 March 2012). "About KHI". Archived from the original on 26 August 2012.
- Kinzer, Stephen (2008). A Thousand Hills: Rwanda's Rebirth and the Man Who Dreamed it (Hardcover ed.). Hoboken, N.J.: John Wiley & Sons. ISBN 978-0-470-12015-6. Archived from the original on 16 August 2023.
- Kwibuka, Eugene (25 November 2008). "Kabuye's release not condition for resuming ties with France-Museminali". The New Times. Archived from the original on 20 March 2014.
- Laing, Aislinn (26 May 2015). "Rwandan parliament petitioned for third term for president Paul Kagame". The Daily Telegraph. London. Archived from the original on 16 December 2020.
- Lavelle, John (5 July 2008). "Resurrecting the East African Shilling". allAfrica.com. Archived from the original on 7 October 2012.
- Library of Congress (27 July 2010). "A Country Study: Uganda". Country Studies. Archived from the original on 27 June 2015.
- Lorch, Donatella (25 April 1995). "Mood Grim at Camp in Rwanda". The New York Times. New York, N.Y. Archived from the original on 19 January 2021.
- Maclean, Ruth (6 December 2018). "Rwandan government critic acquitted of 'baseless' insurrection charges". the Guardian. Archived from the original on 18 July 2024.
- Mamdani, Mahmood (2002). When Victims Become Killers: Colonialism, Nativism, and the Genocide in Rwanda. Princeton, N.J.: Princeton University Press. ISBN 978-0-691-10280-1. Archived from the original on 11 January 2023.
- Matfess, Hilary (1 September 2015). "Rwanda and Ethiopia: Developmental Authoritarianism and the New Politics of African Strong Men". African Studies Review. 58 (2): 181–204. doi:10.1017/asr.2015.43. S2CID 143013060.
- McVeigh, Tracy (20 December 2015). "Rwanda votes to give President Paul Kagame right to rule until 2034". The Guardian. London. Archived from the original on 16 December 2020.
- McGreal, Chris (11 January 2007). "France's shame?". The Guardian. London. Archived from the original on 19 January 2021.
- McGreal, Chris (16 January 2009). "Why Rwanda said adieu to French". The Guardian. London. Archived from the original on 18 May 2015.
- McGreal, Chris (1 October 2010). "Delayed UN report links Rwanda to Congo genocide". The Guardian. London. Archived from the original on 21 August 2016.
- McGreal, Chris (11 December 2012). "Obama accused of failed policy over Rwanda's support of rebel group". The Guardian. London. Archived from the original on 16 December 2020.
- McNeil, Donald G. (14 June 2010). "In Desperately Poor Rwanda, Most Have Health Insurance". The New York Times. New York, N.Y. Archived from the original on 16 December 2020.
- Meierhenrich, Jens (2020). "How Many Victims Were There in the Rwandan Genocide? A Statistical Debate". Journal of Genocide Research. 22 (1): 72–82. doi:10.1080/14623528.2019.1709611. S2CID 213046710.
- Melvern, Linda (2000). A people betrayed: the role of the West in Rwanda's genocide (8, illustrated, reprint ed.). London; New York, N.Y.: Zed Books. ISBN 978-1-85649-831-9. Archived from the original on 11 January 2023.
- Melvern, Linda (2006). Conspiracy to murder: the Rwandan genocide (2, illustrated, revised, annotated ed.). London; New York, N.Y.: Verso. ISBN 978-1-84467-542-5.
- Ministry of Finance and Economic Planning (MINECOFIN) (I), Republic of Rwanda. "Rwanda Vision 2020". Archived from the original on 15 September 2012.
- Ministry of Finance and Economic Planning (MINECOFIN) (II), Republic of Rwanda (2011). "Vision 2020 Progress and Way Forward" (PDF). Archived from the original (PDF) on 4 January 2014.
- Mizero, Paterne (2012). "The Friendship between China and Rwanda" (PDF). Embassy of the People's Republic of China in the Republic of Rwanda. Archived (PDF) from the original on 4 November 2020.
- Mohamed, Hamza (I) (10 February 2019). "Egypt's Sisi takes over as new head of African Union". Al Jazeera. Archived from the original on 17 April 2021.
- Mohamed, Hamza (II) (20 February 2019). "Will Kagame and Museveni resolve their dispute?". Al Jazeera. Archived from the original on 25 November 2020.
- Muhumuza, Rodney (9 April 2019). "25 years after genocide, Rwanda's Kagame is praised, feared". Associated Press. Archived from the original on 10 April 2021.
- Mumbere, Daniel (28 January 2018). "Kagame takes over AU leadership, commits to visa-free regime". Africanews. Archived from the original on 9 November 2020.
- Munyaneza, James (1 April 2013). "Why Rwanda's UN Security Council presidency is good news". The New Times. Kigali. Archived from the original on 4 May 2013.
- Musisi, Frederic (5 June 2020). "Katuna border dispute talks end with no solution in sight". Daily Monitor. Kampala. Archived from the original on 21 March 2021.
- Mutangana, Elie (13 February 2022). "Reopening of border brings hopes of lower sugar prices". Rwanda Today. Archived from the original on 3 December 2022.
- Murdock, Deroy (13 December 2010). "Rwanda's Economic Miracle". National Review.
- Musoni, Edwin (8 June 2011). "Rwanda-China trade up fivefold". The New Times. Kigali. Archived from the original on 20 March 2014.
- Musoni, Edwin (14 January 2013). "President Kagame calls for increased efforts to devt". The New Times. Archived from the original on 20 March 2014.
- Namanya, Mark (31 October 2009). "Kagame Looking Forward to 2010 World Cup in S. Africa". Daily Monitor. Kampala. Archived from the original on 15 December 2020.
- Nantaba, Eriosi (18 October 2010). "Rwanda services sector boosts GDP". allAfrica.com. Archived from the original on 19 October 2012.
- National Assembly of France (15 December 1998). "Report of the Information Mission on Rwanda" (in French). Section 4: L'Attentat du 6 Avril 1994 Contre L'Avion du Président Juvénal Habyarimana. Archived from the original on 5 June 2011.
- New Times (I) (21 January 2010). "Ingabire Visits Genocide Convicts, Promises Help". Kigali. Archived from the original on 31 March 2022.
- New Times (II) (8 March 2009). "Liberia awards Kagame with highest honour". Kigali. Archived from the original on 20 March 2014.
- New Times (III) (19 November 2010). "Kagame visits Benin". Kigali. Archived from the original on 20 March 2014.
- The New York Times (23 April 1994). "Cold Choices in Rwanda". The New York Times. New York, N.Y. Archived from the original on 15 December 2020.
- Nganda, Ssemujju Ibrahim (6 August 2009). "WHO FOUGHT: Kagame helped Museveni crush internal NRA revolt". The Observer. Kampala. Archived from the original on 20 March 2014.
- Norbrook, Nicholas; Kantai, Parselelo; Smith, Patrick (4 October 2019). "How Kagame and Museveni became the best of frenemies". The Africa Report. Archived from the original on 22 December 2020.
- Nunley, Albert C. "Elections in Rwanda". African Elections Database.
- Obeki, Andrew (14 December 2012). "Rwanda: President Paul Kagame and Jeannette Kagame – the First Couple of Rwanda". News of Rwanda. Archived from the original on 7 November 2014.
- Office of the President, Republic of Rwanda (I) (25 October 2011). "Personal Profile". Archived from the original on 15 December 2020.
- Office of the President, Republic of Rwanda (II) (25 October 2011). "President Kagame to address Commonwealth Business Forum". Archived from the original on 24 September 2015.
- Office of the President, Republic of Rwanda (III) (23 August 2012). "President Kagame launches Agaciro Fund". Archived from the original on 15 December 2020.
- Oklahoma Christian University. "Rwanda Initiative". Archived from the original on 15 December 2018.
- Osike, John (17 June 2007). "Rwanda, Burundi join East African union". New Vision. Archived from the original on 20 March 2014.
- PanaPress (15 November 2002). "CECAFA honours East African football legends". Archived from the original on 13 August 2020.
- Pflanz, Mike (29 November 2009). "Rwanda joins the Commonwealth". The Daily Telegraph. London. Archived from the original on 16 December 2020.
- Piel, Simon; Tilouine, Joan (8 December 2016). "British spies closely track mineral-rich Congo's business dealings". Le Monde. Archived from the original on 8 November 2020.
- Pomfret, John (9 July 1997). "Rwandans Led Revolt in Congo". Washington Post. Archived from the original on 30 October 2015.
- Prunier, Gérard (1999). The Rwanda Crisis: History of a Genocide (2nd ed.). Kampala: Fountain Publishers Limited. ISBN 978-9970-02-089-8. Archived from the original on 11 January 2023.
- Prunier, Gérard (2009). Africa's World War: Congo, the Rwandan Genocide, and the Making of a Continental Catastrophe. Oxford: Oxford University Press. ISBN 978-0-19-970583-2.
- "Kagame wins Rwanda presidential polls". Sydney Morning Herald. Reuters. 27 August 2003. Archived from the original on 4 June 2016.
- "France and Rwanda agree to restore relations". Reuters. 29 November 2009. Archived from the original on 7 January 2016.
- "Rwanda completes $95 mln fibre optic network". Reuters Africa. 16 March 2011. Archived from the original on 19 March 2011.
- Reyntjens, Filip (2009). The Great African War: Congo and Regional Geopolitics, 1996–2006. Cambridge: Cambridge University Press. ISBN 978-0-521-11128-7.
- Reyntjens, Filip (2011). "Behind the Façade of Rwanda's Elections". Georgetown Journal of International Affairs. 12 (2): 64–69.
- Reyntjens, Filip (2013). Political Governance in Post-Genocide Rwanda. Cambridge University Press. ISBN 978-1-107-04355-8.
- Reyntjens, Filip (10 March 2022). "Rwanda has reopened the border with Uganda but distrust could close it again". The Conversation. Archived from the original on 18 July 2024.
- Rombouts, Heidy (2004). Victim Organisations and the Politics of Reparation: A Case-Study on Rwanda. Antwerp: Intersentia nv. ISBN 978-90-5095-431-0. Archived from the original on 18 July 2024.
- Ross, Will (9 August 2010). "Vote counting begins in Rwanda's presidential election". BBC News. Archived from the original on 19 October 2013.
- Roth, Kenneth (11 April 2009). "The power of horror in Rwanda". Human Rights Watch. Archived from the original on 23 February 2020.
- Rwanda Human Resources for Health Program (2011). "Funding Proposal" (PDF). Yale School of Medicine. Archived (PDF) from the original on 4 November 2020.
- Rwirahira, Rodrigue (23 January 2012). "12-year basic education program to start in February". Rwanda Focus. Archived from the original on 13 May 2013.
- "Rwanda's Kagame wins re-election by landslide – South Africa Horizon". South Africa Horizon. 10 August 2017. Archived from the original on 10 April 2021.
- Sauuna, Ignatius (10 June 2017). "In Rwanda, a young woman activist challenges longtime leader". AP News.
- Sevenzo, Farai (3 August 2017). "Two terms down, three to go for Rwanda's Kagame?". CNN. Archived from the original on 18 August 2021.
- shadmin (10 August 2017). "Rwanda's Kagame wins re-election by landslide – South Africa Horizon". South Africa Horizon. Archived from the original on 10 April 2021.
- Sherwell, Philip; Long, Nick (21 January 2001). "Kabila killed as friends lost patience". The Daily Telegraph. Archived from the original on 15 December 2020.
- Simpson (I), Chris (14 November 2000). "Kagame: Quiet soldier who runs Rwanda". BBC News. London. Archived from the original on 21 August 2017.
- Simpson (II), Chris (7 June 2000). "How Uganda and Rwanda fell out". BBC News. Archived from the original on 22 August 2020.
- Smith, Stephen (13 January 1995). "La France et le Rwanda à l'heure de la normalisation". Libération (in French).
- Smith, David (25 July 2012). "The end of the west's humiliating affair with Paul Kagame". The Guardian. Archived from the original on 16 December 2020.
- Smith, David (23 April 2014). "Paul Kagame hints at seeking third term as Rwandan president". The Guardian. London. Archived from the original on 16 December 2020.
- Smith, Patrick; Wallis, William (18 October 2002). "Interview with Rwanda's President Paul Kagame". Africa Confidential. Archived from the original on 8 September 2013.
- Singiza, Dantès. "Rwubusisi, Joseph". Royal Museum for Central Africa.
- State House, Republic of Uganda. "H. E. Yoweri K. Museveni". Archived from the original on 6 April 2013.
- Kagire, Edmund; Straziuso, Jason (2 July 2010). "Rwandan opposition candidate denied run for office". U-T San Diego. Associated Press.
- Sundaram, Anjan (25 February 2010). "On Visit to Rwanda, Sarkozy Admits 'Grave Errors' in 1994 Genocide". The New York Times. Archived from the original on 15 December 2020.
- Thomson, Susan (2011). "Whispering truth to power: The everyday resistance of Rwandan peasants to post-genocide reconciliation". African Affairs. 110 (440): 439–456. doi:10.1093/afraf/adr021.
- Topping, Alexandra (4 April 2014). "Kigali's future or costly fantasy? Plan to reshape Rwandan city divides opinion". The Guardian. Archived from the original on 16 December 2020.
- Transparency International (2010). "Corruption Perceptions Index 2010 Results". Archived from the original on 26 December 2018.
- Tumwebaze, Petersen (21 August 2017). "Kagame's inauguration in pictures". The New Times. Kigali. Archived from the original on 24 October 2020.
- Turianskyi, Yarik; Gruzd, Steven (2019). "Will they stick?". The 'Kagame Reforms' of the AU:: Will they stick?. South African Institute of International Affairs. Archived from the original on 3 September 2023.
- United Nations (II). "International Trusteeship System". Archived from the original on 31 August 2011.
- United Nations (III). "Trust and Non-Self-Governing Territories (1945–1999)". Archived from the original on 6 October 2017.
- United Nations (IV) (12 April 2001). "Report of the Panel of Experts on the Illegal Exploitation of Natural Resources and Other Forms of Wealth of the Democratic Republic of the Congo". Archived from the original on 11 November 2014.
- United Nations (V). "Paul Kagame". Secretary General's Millennium Development Goals Advocacy Group. Archived from the original on 16 December 2020.
- United Nations Development Programme (UNDP) (2012). "MDGs Progress and the macroeconomic state of Rwanda, 2012".
- United Nations Children's Fund (UNICEF) (19 July 2012). "Rwanda: Statistics". Archived from the original on 20 March 2014.
- United States House Foreign Affairs Subcommittee on Africa, Global Health and Global Human Rights (20 May 2015). "Testimony of Robert Higiro" (PDF). Archived (PDF) from the original on 25 February 2020.
- USAID (1 July 2020). "History of USAID/Rwanda". Archived from the original on 12 November 2020.
- United States Holocaust Memorial Museum. "Rwanda". Holocaust Encyclopedia. Archived from the original on 2 December 2012.
- University of Glasgow (2007). "Honorary Degrees 2007". Archived from the original on 30 June 2013.
- University of the Pacific (2010). "Honorary Degree 2000–2010". Archived from the original on 24 September 2015.
- Voice of America (30 October 2009). "Kabila Accuses Rwanda of Trying to Profit from Congo Chaos". Archived from the original on 26 October 2021.
- Voluntary Service Overseas (VSO) (May 2012). "VSO Rwanda Education Programme" (PDF). Archived from the original on 25 May 2013.
- Waldorf, Lars (2017). Anders Themnér (ed.). Warlord Democrats in Africa: Ex-Military Leaders and Electoral Politics. Bloomsbury Academic. ISBN 978-1-78360-249-0.
- Walker, Rob (5 August 2010). "Rwanda government denies killings". BBC News. Archived from the original on 11 November 2018.
- Wallis, Andrew (2007). Silent Accomplice: The Untold Story of France's Role in the Rwandan Genocide. London: I.B.Tauris. ISBN 978-1-84511-247-9. Archived from the original on 18 July 2024.
- Waugh, Colin (2004). Paul Kagame And Rwanda: Power, Genocide and the Rwandan Patriotic Front. Jefferson, N.C.: McFarland. ISBN 978-0-7864-1941-8. Archived from the original on 18 July 2024.
- Whewell, Tim (31 March 2010). "What is the true price of Rwanda's recovery?". BBC Newsnight. Archived from the original on 17 March 2024.
- Wilkinson, Tracy (7 February 2008). "Spain indicts 40 Rwandan officers". Los Angeles Times. Los Angeles, Calif. Archived from the original on 28 December 2013.
- Wintour, Patrick (18 January 2008). "Blair takes on unpaid role as Rwanda adviser". The Guardian. London. Archived from the original on 16 December 2020.
- World Bank (I). "School enrollment, tertiary (% gross)". Data. Archived from the original on 30 October 2013.
- World Bank (II). "Rwanda". Data. Archived from the original on 4 April 2014.
- World Bank (III) (2012). "Economy Rankings". Archived from the original on 6 February 2015.
- World Bank (IV) (2012). "Ease of doing business index". Archived from the original on 3 February 2013.
- World Bank (V) (2020). "GDP per capita, PPP (current international $) – Rwanda". Archived from the original on 29 July 2021.
- World Bank (VI) (2020). "GDP growth (annual %) – Rwanda". Archived from the original on 24 August 2021.
- World Health Organization (WHO) (I) (2009). WHO Country Cooperation Strategy, 2009–2013: Rwanda (PDF). ISBN 978-92-9031-135-5. Archived from the original (PDF) on 19 October 2010.
- World Health Organization (WHO) (II) (2008). "Sharing the burden of sickness: mutual health insurance in Rwanda". Bulletin of the World Health Organization. 86 (11): 817–908. ISSN 0042-9686. Archived from the original on 13 November 2008.
- World Review (10 January 2013). "Paul Kagame guides Rwanda out of war and poverty". Archived from the original on 28 April 2013.
- York, Geoffrey (19 November 2015). "Rwandan officer who leaked assassination-list evidence becomes a target". The Globe and the Mail. Archived from the original on 6 August 2018.
- York, Geoffrey (22 December 2017). "Details of latest Rwandan assassination plot exposed". The Globe and the Mail. Archived from the original on 1 January 2019.

Political offices
| Preceded by Fred Rwigyema | Chief of Defence Staff of the Rwandan Patriotic Army as Commander-in-chief of the Rwandan Patriotic Front until 1994; October 1990 – 1998 | Succeeded by Faustin Kayumba Nyamwasa |
| Preceded by Augustin Bizimana | Minister of Defence; 19 July 1994 – 22 April 2000 | Succeeded by Emmanuel Habyarimana |
| New office | Vice President of Rwanda; 19 July 1994 – 22 April 2000 | Position abolished |
| Preceded by Alexis Kanyarengwe | President of the Rwandan Patriotic Front; 15 February 1998 – present | Incumbent |
| Preceded by Pasteur Bizimungu | President of Rwanda; 22 April 2000–present Acting President: 24 March 2000 – 22 April 2000 | Incumbent |
