= 1994 in Rwanda =

- Decades: 1970s; 1980s; 1990s; 2000s; 2010s
- See also: Other events of 1994; List of years in Rwanda

The following lists events that happened during 1994 in the Republic of Rwanda.

== Incumbents ==
- President:
  - until 6 April: Juvénal Habyarimana
  - 6 April – 19 July: Théodore Sindikubwabo (acting)
  - starting 19 July: Pasteur Bizimungu
- Prime Minister:
  - until 6 April: Agathe Uwilingiyimana
  - 9 April – 19 July: Jean Kambanda
  - starting 19 July: Faustin Twagiramungu

== Events ==
=== April 6 ===
- April 6 – The airplane carrying Rwandan President Juvénal Habyarimana and Burundian President Cyprien Ntaryamira was shot down as it prepared to land in Kigali. This was the major cause for the Rwandan genocide.
- April 7 – The Hutu Rwandans started murdering thousands of Tutsi Rwandans and moderate Hutus. Prime Minister Agathe Uwilingiyimana was among those murdered.
- April 8 – Théodore Sindikubwabo becomes interim President of Rwanda.
- April 21 – The Red Cross estimates that hundreds of thousands of Tutsi have been killed in Rwanda.
- April 30 – Rwandan genocide
  - A discussion on the genocide is made at the United Nations Security Council, with the omission of the word "genocide" to describe the killings.
  - Tens of thousands of Tutsi Rwandans flee to Zaire, Burundi and Tanzania.

=== May ===
- May 17 – The United Nations agrees to send 6,800 troops to Rwanda to defend the civilians.

=== July ===
- July 4 – The Hutu government is finally defeated by the Rwandan Patriotic Front, thus ending the genocide.
- July 18 – Rwandan Patriotic Front troops capture Gisenyi, forcing the interim government into Zaire.

=== August ===
- August 21 – The Rwandan Patriotic Front controls the whole of Rwanda.

== Deaths ==
=== April ===
- 6 April
  - Juvénal Habyarimana, politician, President (1973–1994; born 1937)
  - Déogratias Nsabimana, general, Chief of Staff of the Rwandan Army (born 1945)
- 7 April
  - Joseph Kavaruganda, jurist, President of the Constitutional Court (1979–1994; born 1935)
  - Lando Ndasingwa, politician and businessman
  - Faustin Rucogoza, politician
  - Cyprien and Daphrose Rugamba, married couple and Catholic martyrs
  - Agathe Uwilingiyimana, politician, Prime Minister (1993–1994; born 1953)
- 20 April – Rosalie Gicanda, Queen (1942–1959), Queen Dowager (1959–1994; born 1928)
