= 2000 in Rwanda =

- Decades: 1980s; 1990s; 2000s; 2010s; 2020s
- See also: Other events of 2000; List of years in Rwanda

The following lists events that happened during 2000 in Rwanda.

== Incumbents ==
- President: Pasteur Bizimungu (until 23 March), Paul Kagame (starting 24 March)
- Prime Minister: Pierre-Célestin Rwigema (until 8 March), Bernard Makuza (starting 8 March)
