= 2007 in Rwanda =

- Decades: 1980s; 1990s; 2000s; 2010s; 2020s
- See also: Other events of 2007; List of years in Rwanda

The following lists events that happened during 2007 in Rwanda.

== Incumbents ==
- President: Paul Kagame
- Prime Minister: Bernard Makuza

== Events ==
=== June ===
- June 18 - Rwanda and Burundi join the East African Community in a meeting in Kampala, Uganda.

=== July ===
- July 21 - Two Rwandan men wanted for their role in the 1994 genocide are arrested in France.
- July 27 - Rwanda abolishes capital punishment.

=== August ===
- August 15 - Charles Murigande, the foreign minister of Rwanda, criticizes the Democratic Republic of Congo for stopping military operations against the Democratic Forces for the Liberation of Rwanda.

=== November ===
- November 16 - The International Criminal Tribunal for Rwanda sentences Juvénal Rugambarara, the former mayor of Bicumbi, to 11 years in jail for crimes he committed during the Rwandan Genocide.
