= 1995 in Rwanda =

- Decades: 1970s; 1980s; 1990s; 2000s; 2010s
- See also: Other events of 1995; List of years in Rwanda

The following events happened in Rwanda during the year 1995.

== Incumbents ==
- President: Pasteur Bizimungu
- Prime Minister: Faustin Twagiramungu (until 31 August), Pierre-Célestin Rwigema (starting 31 August)
