= 1997 in Rwanda =

- Decades: 1970s; 1980s; 1990s; 2000s; 2010s
- See also: Other events of 1997; List of years in Rwanda

The following lists events that happened during 1997 in Rwanda.

== Incumbents ==
- President: Pasteur Bizimungu
- Prime Minister: Pierre-Célestin Rwigema

== Events ==
=== January to April ===
- January–August - At least 6,000 people, most of whom civilians and returnees from the Great Lakes refugee crisis, are reported to have been killed by militants across the country.
- 19 January - In northwest Rwanda, Hutu militia members kill 6 Spanish aid workers, 3 soldiers, and seriously wound another.
- 4 February - Five UN Human Rights Field Operation in Rwanda (HRFOR) workers are ambushed and killed in southwest Cyangugu Province. The victims included a Briton, Cambodian, and three Rwandans, all of whom were human rights observers of the OHCHR.
