= 1993 in Rwanda =

- Decades: 1970s; 1980s; 1990s; 2000s; 2010s
- See also: Other events of 1993; List of years in Rwanda

The following lists events that happened during 1993 in Rwanda.

== Incumbents ==
- President: Juvénal Habyarimana
- Prime Minister: Dismas Nsengiyaremye (until 18 July), Agathe Uwilingiyimana (starting 18 July)

== Events ==
=== August ===
- August 4 - The Arusha Accords are signed between President Juvénal Habyarimana and leaders of the RPF in Arusha, Tanzania, ending the Rwandan Civil War.
