= 1999 in Rwanda =

- Decades: 1970s; 1980s; 1990s; 2000s; 2010s
- See also: Other events of 1999; List of years in Rwanda

The following lists events that happened during 1999 in Rwanda.

== Incumbents ==
- President: Pasteur Bizimungu
- Prime Minister: Pierre-Célestin Rwigema

== Events ==
=== April ===
- April 21 – Rwanda rejects the peace agreement in Libya to end the Second Congo War.

=== May ===
- May 28 – Rwanda declares a ceasefire in the Democratic Republic of the Congo.
