= 1998 in Rwanda =

- Decades: 1970s; 1980s; 1990s; 2000s; 2010s
- See also: Other events of 1998; List of years in Rwanda

The following lists events that happened during 1998 in Rwanda.

== Incumbents ==
- President: Pasteur Bizimungu
- Prime Minister: Pierre-Célestin Rwigema

== Events ==
=== January ===
- January 19 - Hutu rebels attack a Bralirwa Brewery company bus in Gisenyi and set it on fire. 39 of the 74 passengers die in the attack.

=== August ===
- August 4 - Rebel forces revolt against Kabila's government in the east of DRC, starting the Second Congo War. Accusations of Rwanda backing them up have been made with Rwanda denying it.
- August 6 - Fighting spreads across DRC and on borders with Rwanda, Uganda and Tanzania. Rwanda continues to deny involvement with the rebels and a summit is held in Zimbabwe discussing the conflict.
- August 9 - Democratic Republic of the Congo President Laurent Kabila and Rwandan President Pasteur Bizimungu make accusations against each other after the end of a summit concerning the Second Congo War. Kabila accuses Rwanda of backing up the rebels who captured several Congolese towns. Bizimungu denies Rwanda's involvement in the war and accuses Kabila of making Rwanda a scrapgoat for the rebellion.
- August 21 - South African President Nelson Mandela calls for a summit over the Congo conflict on Saturday, inviting the leaders of DRC, Rwanda, Uganda and Zimbabwe to come.
- August 31 - Rwanda warns DRC that it might invade to protect the ethnic Tutsis.

=== November ===
- November 6 - After months of denial, Rwanda finally admits sending troops to DRC.
