= 2006 in Rwanda =

- Decades: 1980s; 1990s; 2000s; 2010s; 2020s
- See also: Other events of 2006; List of years in Rwanda

The following is a list of events that happened during 2006 in Rwanda.

== Incumbents ==
- President: Paul Kagame
- Prime Minister: Bernard Makuza
