= 2008 in Rwanda =

- Decades: 1980s; 1990s; 2000s; 2010s; 2020s
- See also: Other events of 2008; List of years in Rwanda

The following lists events that happened during 2008 in Rwanda.

== Incumbents ==
- President: Paul Kagame
- Prime Minister: Bernard Makuza

== Events ==
=== August ===
- August 5 - Rwanda formally accuses senior French officials, including former Prime Minister Dominique de Villepin and late President François Mitterrand, of involvement in the 1994 Rwandan genocide and calls for them to be put on trial.

=== September ===
- September 17 - Rwanda becomes the first nation where women outnumber men in parliament.

=== October ===
- October 9 - The Democratic Republic of the Congo accuses Rwanda of sending troops across the border, threatening the city of Goma.

=== December ===
- December 18 - The International Criminal Tribunal for Rwanda finds Théoneste Bagosora guilty of genocide, crimes against humanity and war crimes and sentences him to life imprisonment.
