= 2009 in Rwanda =

- Decades: 1980s; 1990s; 2000s; 2010s; 2020s
- See also: Other events of 2009; List of years in Rwanda

The following lists events that happened during 2009 in Rwanda.

== Incumbents ==
- President: Paul Kagame
- Prime Minister: Bernard Makuza

== Events ==
=== January ===
- January 20 - The Rwandan Defense Forces and Congolese Armed Forces jointly search the Democratic Republic of the Congo for Hutu leaders who participated in the 1994 Rwandan genocide.
- January 23 - National Congress and Tutsi leader Laurent Nkunda is arrested in Rwanda.

=== May ===
- May 13 - The Democratic Forces for the Liberation of Rwanda kill at least 90 people in South Kivu, Democratic Republic of the Congo.

=== July ===
- July 6 - Burundi and Rwanda join the East African Community Customs Union.

=== August ===
- August 6 - The Presidents of Democratic Republic of Congo and Rwanda, Joseph Kabila and Paul Kagame, pledge to boost economic and security ties after a rare meeting.
- August 12 - Gregoire Ndahimana, a Rwandan fugitive accused of genocide and crimes against humanity, is arrested by a joint Rwandan-Congolese military operation.

=== September ===
- September 18 - Michel Bagaragaza, former head of Rwanda's tea industry, pleads guilty to complicity in the 1994 genocide, altering his original not guilty plea.
- September 20 - The Democratic Republic of Congo transfers Grégoire Ndahimana to the International Criminal Tribunal for Rwanda to stand trial for the massacre of at least 2,000 Rwandan Tutsis during the 1994 genocide.
- September 28 - Grégoire Ndahimana, a former mayor accused of taking part in the 1994 Rwandan genocide, pleads not guilty at a United Nations tribunal.

=== October ===
- October 6 - One of the most wanted suspects involved in the 1994 Rwandan Genocide, Idelphonse Nizeyimana, is arrested in the Ugandan capital Kampala.
- October 18 - A Rwandan doctor working in a French hospital is suspended after a nurse locates an Internet Interpol arrest warrant, accusing him of a 1994 "genocide, war crimes".
- October 29 - Rwandan man Désiré Munyaneza is given a life sentence in Canada for his role in the Rwandan genocide under the Crimes Against Humanity and War Crimes Act.

=== November ===
- November 29 - Rwanda is admitted under the Edinburgh criteria as the second member of the Commonwealth of Nations without any historical ties to the United Kingdom.

=== December ===
- December 4 - Three Rwandan soldiers are killed while on a peacekeeping mission in Darfur, Sudan.
