= 2004 in Rwanda =

- Decades: 1980s; 1990s; 2000s; 2010s; 2020s
- See also: Other events of 2004; List of years in Rwanda

The following lists events that happened during 2004 in Rwanda.

== Incumbents ==
- President: Paul Kagame
- Prime Minister: Bernard Makuza
