= 2010 in Rwanda =

- Decades: 1990s; 2000s; 2010s; 2020s
- See also: Other events of 2010; List of years in Rwanda

The following lists events that happened during 2010 in Rwanda.

== Incumbents ==
- President: Paul Kagame
- Prime Minister: Bernard Makuza

== Events ==
=== February ===
- February 17 - Rwanda will be the global host of World Environment Day on 5 June 2010.
- February 25 - The International Criminal Tribunal for Rwanda jails Lieut-Col Eprem Setako, the Ministry of Defence's former head of legal affairs, for 25 years after finding him guilty of genocide and crimes against humanity.

=== March ===
- March 2 - Agathe Habyarimana, the widow of former President Juvénal Habyarimana, accused of helping plan the 1994 genocide, is arrested in France.
- March 9 - First President of Rwanda Dominique Mbonyumutwa's son objects to the removal of his father's corpse from the Democracy Stadium in Gitarama, saying it defies a court ruling.

=== April ===
- April 7 - At least six people die and at least twelve others are injured after a boat sinks in Lake Kivu while carrying people to commemorations to mark the 16th anniversary of the Rwandan genocide.
- April 20 - Two high-ranking officers are suspended from Rwanda's military and arrested; Maj-Gen Charles Muhire is accused of corruption and misuse of office, whilst Lt-Gen Karenzi Karake is accused of immoral conduct.
- April 21 - Rwandan opposition leader Victoire Ingabire Umuhoza is arrested on charges such as collaboration with a terrorist organisation and genocide denial.
- April 22 - President Paul Kagame's rival Victoire Ingabire Umuhoza is released one day after her arrest on charges of terrorism and genocide denial but banned from leaving Kigali and ordered to report to authorities twice a month.
