= Drew White (lawyer) =

Canadian lawyer

Drew White QC
- Occupation: Attorney
- Known for: Prosecuting human rights violations

Drew White (QC) is an international lawyer from Canada best known for his role in the conviction of Colonel Theoneste Bagosora, who the media dubbed "the mastermind" of the 1994 Rwanda genocide and who White referred to in his closing trial submissions as one of the "enemies of the human race".

== International criminal prosecutions ==
In total, between October 2000 and December 2011, White prosecuted the trials of six accused at the International Criminal Tribunal for Rwanda (UNICTR) in Arusha, Tanzania, resulting in five convictions and life sentences at trial (four sentences were reduced on appeal).

=== The 'Military 1' Trial ===
Between 11 and 16 November 2005 White cross-examined Colonel Bagosora obtaining the admission that Bagosora had been just outside the office door where ten Belgian UN peacekeepers had sought refuge and were under attack by Rwandan Government Forces on the morning of 7 April 1994. White had Bagosora concede that the Colonel knew that some of the 10 Belgians had been killed and some were still alive and that when he left the scene he expected the remaining Belgian peacekeepers to be killed. That concession was a key piece of evidence upon which Bagosora was convicted of the murder of some of the peacekeepers. White's lengthy cross-examination also helped to ground Bagosora's conviction at trial on numerous other counts of genocide, war crimes and crimes against humanity, including the murder and sexual violation of Rwandan prime minister Agathe Uwilingiyimana and the murder of the chief justice of the constitutional court, Joseph Kavaruganda.

Between 19 and 27 January 2004, during the prosecution phase of the ‘Military 1 Trial’, White presented prosecution witness Lieutenant-General Romeo Dallaire of the Canadian Armed Forces (now Senator Dallaire), the UNAMIR force commander whose testimony was central to the case and was reported to be the most-watched media event in the history of the ICTR, with an "unprecedented number of international reporters". White's examinations of Dallaire and his aide, Major Brent Beardsley, extracted key evidence from the two witnesses who had been obviously shaken from the experience of their observations in 1994. Portions of that evidence have become so widely known they are now central to the general public's understanding of the events in Rwanda, such as Colonel Bagosora being the "kingpin" whom the Trial Chamber confirmed was in charge on the morning of April 7, as well as the evidence of sexual crimes, particularly as described by Maj. Beardsley.

Other notable cross-examinations conducted by White in the ‘Military 1’ case include former Rwandan prime minister Jean Kambanda, Colonel Luc Marchal of the Belgian Armed Forces, and Joseph Nzirorera the former head of the MRND political party and the president of the National Assembly.

UK journalist and author Linda Melvern, in her book "Conspiracy to Murder" repeatedly cited White's "methodical and thorough" cross-examination of Col. Bagosora for the significance of the evidence that was adduced. Following the December 2008 ‘Military 1’ trial judgement, CNN broadcast a special report by correspondent Christiane Amanpour, who reported that for international criminal law the case was a "milestone in justice" and of "enormous importance" and commented that "... I have been watching this case from the beginning, and they said it couldn’t be done but let me tell you it has just been done ...".

=== The 'Gatete' Trial ===
The 2011 conviction of government minister Jean-Baptiste Gatete for genocide and crimes against humanity was notable partly because the trial also established the grounds for Conspiracy to Commit Genocide, a conviction which was held on appeal. The case thus stands as one of the very few to convict for Conspiracy to Commit Genocide. Minister Gatete elected not to testify and therefore avoided cross-examination. White's closing submissions that Gatete be convicted and sentenced to life imprisonment were accepted by the trial court. The appellate court later reduced the sentence to a term of 40 years because of a 7-year delay between the time of arrest and trial.

=== The 'Nizeyimana' Trial ===
The 2012 conviction of Captain Ildephonse Nizeyimana for genocide, crimes against humanity and war crimes and for the April 1994 murder of the elderly Tutsi queen Rosalie Gicanda in the town of Butare was another legal milestone that received significant public and media attention. It was the final trial of a Rwandan military officer at the ICTR. Distinctly, prosecution of the Nizeyimana case was recognized by the trial court as "... one of the fastest completions of a trial of this size in the history of the tribunal", after having heard 84 witnesses in 56 days. Captain Nizeyimana elected not to testify and therefore avoided cross-examination. The trial court followed White's closing submissions and sentenced Nizeyimana to life imprisonment but on 29 September 2014 the appellate court reduced the sentence to a term of 35 years, while upholding the majority of the convictions.

=== Written Advocacy ===
In addition to courtroom advocacy White was a prolific legal writer in the course of the ICTR prosecutions, making significant written contributions to numerous indictments, two pre-trial briefs, three final briefs and several hundred interlocutory proceedings on points of law and evidence. The ‘Military 1’ final brief alone exceeded 950 pages in length, and began with White's authorship of an overview section entitled ‘The Philosophy of Genocide’ that placed the trial evidence of the events into a broader context. Most of these contributions were during a period when there was little practical legal precedent in international criminal law and many of the issues were being dealt with for the first time.

=== International Criminal Law Contemporaries ===
During the various prosecutions White worked with prosecution teams and alongside numerous other colleagues, some prominent in international criminal law, including Chile Eboe-Osuji, currently a judge and President of the ICC-CPI, Fatou Bensouda, currently the chief prosecutor of the ICC-CPI, James Kirkpatrick Stewart, currently the deputy prosecutor of the ICC-CPI, Stephen Rapp, currently the global justice special ambassador for the USA State Dept., Dr. Alex Obote-Odora, currently a Stockholm University professor and author and Dr. Alison Des Forges (deceased 2009) the Rwanda historian and Human Rights Watch advisor who once observed that White was "... probably the only living person to have challenged Colonel Bagosora to his face."

== International Human Rights Investigations ==
White’s human rights work supporting accountability through international investigations includes Rwanda, Libya, Syria, Iraq and Afghanistan. He was the Reporting Officer and Legal Advisor to the Office of the High Commissioner for Human Rights (OHCHR) Investigation on Libya in 2015 (OIOL) producing a report for the Human Rights Council. In 2016 for the Commission for International Justice and Accountability (CIJA) he prepared an analysis report of evidence documenting extensive crimes and abuses in Syria and Iraq. During 2017-2019 he led human rights field teams to document civilian casualties, war crimes and crimes against humanity in Afghanistan, for the United Nations Assistance Mission for Afghanistan (UNAMA).

== Canadian legal background ==
White's first trial was a prosecution in February 1988 at the youth court in Halifax, Nova Scotia while he was a student in the Criminal Law Clinic of Dalhousie Law School. Later that year he articled and then set up legal practice in Vancouver, British Columbia where he both defended individual clients and did ad hoc prosecutions on contract with the Provincial attorney-general's ministry, until 2000 when he contracted exclusively with the United Nations.

== Education and professional standing ==
White holds a law degree from Dalhousie University in Halifax, Nova Scotia and a philosophy degree from the University of British Columbia in Vancouver, British Columbia. He appears on the List of Counsel authorized to practice before the International Criminal Court, he is a member of the International Criminal Bar Association (BPI-ICB) and since 1989 he has been a member of the Law Society of British Columbia (LSBC), where he is a barrister, solicitor and notary public.

White was appointed as a Queen's Counsel (QC) in 2019. The appointment was made by the Attorney-General of British Columbia, the Honourable David Eby QC, following a recommendation by an advisory committee that included the Chief Justice of British Columbia, Robert J. Bauman, the Chief Justice of the Supreme Court of British Columbia, Christopher E. Hinkson, the Chief Judge of the Provincial Court of British Columbia, Melissa Gillespie, the President of the Law Society of BC, Nancy G. Merrill QC, and the President of the Canadian Bar Association-BC Branch, Kenneth Armstrong QC.

== Media appearances ==
White appears briefly on-screen in director Christophe Gargot's French language documentary film “D’ Arusha a Arusha” (2009) that examines the process of international criminal tribunals and which features notable personalities including Paul Kagame, Navanethem Pillay, Erik Mose, Carla Del Ponte, Ramsey Clark, Faustin Twagiramungu, Laurien Ntezimana, Georges Ruggiu, Theoneste Bagosora and Raphael Constant. White appears in an excerpt from the ‘Military 1’ courtroom, making submissions about the state of the evidence regarding the shooting down of the plane on 6 April 1994 that killed Rwandan president Juvenal Habyarimana and Burundian president Cyprien Ntaryamira.

Following the completion of the Bagosora prosecution and the 'Military 1' trial, White gave a feature interview on the Canadian Broadcasting Corporation (CBC) national Radio One network to Matt Galloway for The Current news and information broadcast on 23 July 2007. The interview was selected as an 'Editor's Choice' as the highlight of the broadcast day and published online in the MeFeedia podcast system.
