= 2001 in Rwanda =

- Decades: 1980s; 1990s; 2000s; 2010s; 2020s
- See also: Other events of 2001; List of years in Rwanda

The following lists events that happened during 2001 in the Republic of Rwanda.

== Incumbents ==
- President: Paul Kagame
- Prime Minister: Bernard Makuza

== Events ==
=== March ===
- March 12 - Uganda is accused of harbouring anti-Rwandan elements starting a feud between the two countries.
