= Drew White =

Drew White may refer to:

- Drew White (lawyer)
- Drew White (racing driver)

== See also ==
- Andrew White (disambiguation)
