= Rwigema =

Rwigema or Rwigyema may refer to:

- Fred Rwigyema (1957-1990), former leader of the Rwandese Patriotic Front
- Pierre-Célestin Rwigema (born 1953 or 1954), former Prime Minister of Rwanda
