= Initial events of the Rwandan genocide =

Events that lead to the Rwandan genocide

The assassination of presidents Juvénal Habyarimana and Cyprien Ntaryamira in the evening of April 6, 1994 was the proximate trigger for the Rwandan genocide, which resulted in the murder of approximately 800,000 Tutsi and a smaller number of moderate Hutu. The first few days following the assassinations included a number of key events that shaped the subsequent course of the genocide. These included: the seizing of power by an interim government directed by the hard-line Akazu clique; the liquidation of opposition Hutu politicians; the implementation of plans to carry out a genocide throughout the country; and the murder of United Nations peacekeepers, contributing to the impulse of the international community to refrain from intervention.

== The crisis committee meets (6th) ==
At approximately 8:20 pm on April 6, 1994, the plane carrying Rwandan President Juvénal Habyarimana, Rwandan Armed Forces (FAR) Chief of Staff Deogratias Nsabimana, and other prominent figures was shot down while approaching Kigali International Airport. Defence Minister Augustin Bizimana was in Cameroon attending a meeting, along with Col. Aloys Ntiwiragabo, head of army intelligence, G-2. Approximately one and a half to two hours after the crash, the officers at army headquarters in Kigali realized that they had to decide whom to appoint the new army chief of staff and somberly gathered in a meeting room. Soon after Col. Théoneste Bagosora, director of the office of the minister of defence, arrived and stated that it was his responsibility to chair the meeting. Bagosora had a poor reputation as a military man, having received his appointment due to his political connections in the governing MRND party. One colonel suggested that Major-General Augustin Ndindiliyimana, chief of the staff of the National Gendarmerie, would be a more appropriate choice, but Ndindiliyimana declined to take responsibility, to the astonishment of some officers.

There was widespread fear of a power vacuum. Prime Minister Agathe Uwilingiyimana was next in the line of political succession but most officers believed that she was not capable of governing; Bagosora dismissed the option of putting themselves under the authority of Uwiligiyimana. There was discussion about abiding by the Arusha Accords, but this would require consulting with the rebel Rwandan Patriotic Front on the next steps. Bagosora suggested that the military should take over, but received the support of only one officer, Lt-Col Cyprien Kayumba, director of Defense Ministry financial services. Most officers were desperate to avoid the impression of a coup d'état. Someone commented that the Accords were still in effect and the United Nations remained in the country. The officers agreed to contact the United Nations Assistance Mission for Rwanda (UNAMIR) and invite General Roméo Dallaire, UNAMIR Force Commander, to the meeting to show that a coup was not being carried out.

== Assassination of Prime Minister Uwilingiyimana and moderate Hutus ==
During the night of 6 April to 7 April, the members of the Forces armées rwandaises, under the leadership of Bagosora, engaged in heated discourse with General Roméo Dallaire, then commander of the UNAMIR. UNAMIR served as the military and legal force behind the Prime Minister of Rwanda, in addition to its other peacekeeping duties.

Uwilingyimana planned to launch an appeal for national calm over radio the following morning. General Dallaire sent an armed escort of five Ghanaian and ten Belgian peacekeepers to Uwiligiyimana to accompany her to the radio station. However, the presidential guard took control of the state radio station that morning and Uwilingyimana had to cancel her speech. Later that day, the presidential guard assassinated her along with 10 Belgian UNAMIR peacekeepers. At 9:00 p.m., Dallaire learned that Belgians had been killed and Ghanaians brought to safety by Hutu forces.

Many powerful moderate Hutus who favored the Arusha Accords were later assassinated. An attempt was made on the life of Faustin Twagiramungu, the prime minister of the Transitional Broad Based Government under the accords, but it failed thanks to the efforts of the UNAMIR.

== Execution of Belgian peacekeepers ==
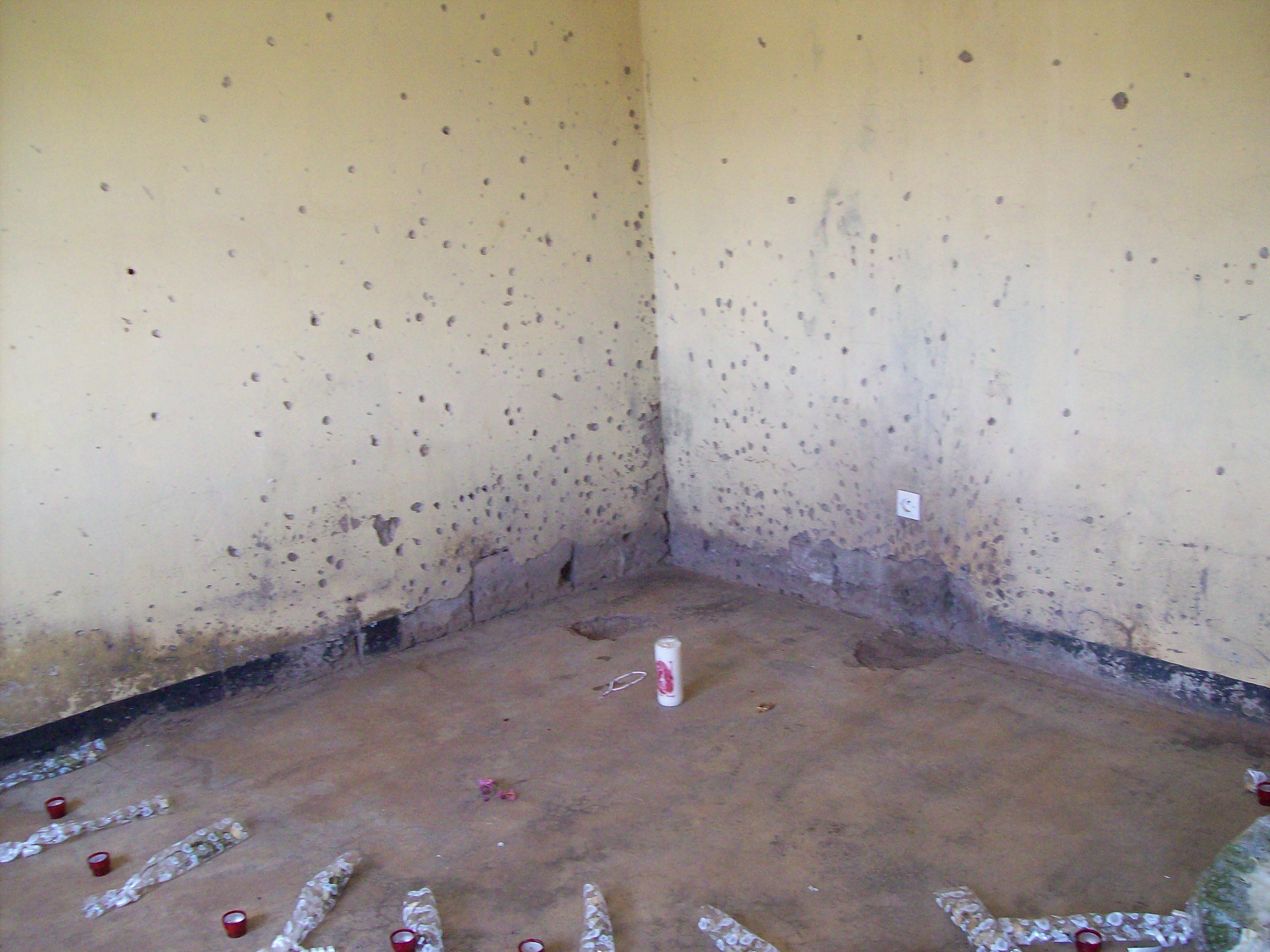
Memorial for the dead Belgian UNAMIR personnel in Kigali.

The presidential guard captured the fifteen UN peacekeeping troops from UNAMIR, who had been protecting Uwilingiyimana. Five out of the fifteen were Ghanaian soldiers who were quickly set free. The other ten were Belgians from the Paracommando Brigade, shot and hacked with machetes. Major Bernard Ntuyahaga was convicted of the Belgians' murders in 2007.

Bagosora and his entourage immediately advised General Dallaire that it was better for the Belgians to leave immediately because the radio accused them of being the perpetrators behind the attack on the presidential airplane. These accusations had aroused the uncontrollable anger of the group. Earlier in the year, General Dallaire had been told by an informer named "Jean-Pierre" in January 1994 that there was a plan to attack the Belgians in order to make them leave the UNAMIR, where they formed the largest contingent of soldiers.

== Evacuation of foreign personnel by Belgium and France ==
France and Belgium formed two separate militarily assisted evacuation operations whose actions are detailed in the role of the international community article. France also evacuated dignitaries, families of Habyarimana regime officials, and the children in a presidential orphanage.

These evacuations were the cause of two very large controversies, after the fact. The first is over whether the genocide could have been stopped at the outset by nearby Western troops. At the time, there were American soldiers in Burundi, two hundred kilometres south of Kigali. Larger groups of Western troops were also a few hours from Rwanda by aeroplane. Soldiers agree that these troops had the power to retake control of Kigali and to decisively support UNAMIR, which had a lamentable lack of equipment. The other controversy related to the complete refusal to evacuate the endangered Tutsi. The only Western country which evacuated any Tutsi was Belgium; these were a very few Tutsi who had succeeded in including themselves into the evacuated groups by negotiation or infiltration.

== Composition of the interim government ==
The new government was created after Uwilingiyimana's assassination. Its prime minister was the first to be condemned by the International Criminal Tribunal for Rwanda: Jean Kambanda, who pleaded guilty. Read sub-chapters 14.4 to 14.8 of the United Nations report. This government was characterized as controlling the genocide. The ICTR has sentenced or is in the process of sentencing the majority of its members. It seems that there was a fight for influence between Colonel Bagosora, who controlled the presidential guard, and the chief of staff of the FAR who wished to create a civil government. This government was thus the result of a trade-off of circumstances and Bagosora, who renounced a military government, "set up” (according to the terms of the agreement with the UN) a civil government formed of adept members of the Hutu Power, motivated by the extermination of the Tutsi.

== Civil war starts again between the RGF and the RPF ==
In 1993, the Arusha peace Accords established Rwandese Patriotic Front (RPF) and Rwandese Government Forces (RGF) sectors within Kigali, leaving a demilitarized zone between the two. Each side was supposed to work towards disarming after the Broad-Based Transitional Government (BBTG) was established, setting the stage for democracy and healing after the recent civil wars. The RGF was closely affiliated with the Presidential Guard and the Gendarmes (national police force of Rwanda), and loyal to the Rwandan president Habyarimana (a Hutu). Other Hutu power extremist groups aligned themselves with the RGF (including the MRND, the president's own Hutu power extremist political party). On the opposite side, the RPF was viewed by the RGF and affiliated groups as trying to take control of Rwanda with only Tutsi interests in mind, shutting out the Hutus in an attempt to return to colonial times when the Tutsis were the ruling class. Caught in the middle were moderates trying to weave the fragile peace tighter together.

April 6, 1994, was the start of the civil war and ensuing genocide. That evening, the Rwandan president Major General Juvenal Habyarimana's plane was shot down over the Kigali airport. Also on board was Cyprien Ntaryamira, the president of Burundi, and Deogratias Nsabimana, the chief of staff of the army. There were no survivors. The RGF immediately blamed the RPF for the assassination, and that very night the fragile peace accords shattered. The Presidential Guard immediately set out on well planned missions to assassinate all moderate Hutus and every last Tutsi, starting with those affiliated with the now destroyed Arusha Accords and the BBTG. They began their mission shortly after the plane crash, wasting no time. On the morning of April 7, the country was already deep in bloodshed.

After the plane crash, UNAMIR found themselves spread thinly throughout the city, with their mandate now up in the air. They did not have enough forces to provide security for those now under attack, and were told by the United Nations to not fire unless fired upon. Civilians poured into the UN areas seeking protection, to find no food, running water, or electricity, the last two being severed very rapidly after the assassination of President Habyarimana. UNAMIR had little guidance as far as how they were to treat the civilians, and to what extent protection could be provided. Added to this were dozens of government employees and those in former positions of power who immediately realized they were in grave danger. Calls to UNAMIR for protection came faster than UNAMIR could respond, and traveling through Kigali to rescue people was not only highly dangerous, but impossible in many circumstances. Lack of vehicles, lack of secure communication, lack of gasoline, and lack of troops crippled the rescue efforts.

On April 7, it was decided that Uwilingiyimana, who worked vigilantly towards establishing the BBTG, should give a speech to the populace calling for calm. Radio Rwanda was the chosen, government controlled radio station, but she was denied access and assassinated shortly thereafter. With the government controlled radio station off limits, there was no one left to calm civilians. Misinformation and hate speech began to fill the radio waves from the independent station, RTLM. RTLM immediately blamed Belgian peacekeepers and the RPF for the President's plane crash, asking for the population to rise up and kill the peace keepers and all Tutsi "cockroaches". Fear and hate, already deeply rooted within the country, was further spread at lightning speed, leaving UNAMIR powerless to stop the broadcasts despite pleas to the RGF to cease transmissions.

The RPF (Rwandese Patriotic Front) became the only force capable of stopping the Presidential Guard (along with the Gendarmes and Interahamwe - Kinyarwanda for 'those who attack together') who were setting up roadblocks throughout Kigali and starting the process of slaughtering Tutsis and moderate Hutus. The Interahamwe were composed of local citizens, driven to extreme hate against the Tutsis, and were very difficult to control due to their close ties to the local communities and alliance with the RGF. UNAMIR's hands were tied. So the RPF, now out of options, launched major offenses against the RGF, with the RGF returning fire. The RGF leadership disavowed any connection with the 'rogue' gangs committing the killings, though the RGF leader, Colonel Théoneste Bagosora, was later convicted of being a key orchestrator of the genocide. With all diplomatic ties severed, the only way to end the slaughter was to battle the RGF and wrestle control away from the Hutu extremist groups. The RPF were also guilty of bloodshed; some Hutu extremists who were thought, or known, to have killed innocent civilians were killed by the RPF, although not nearly to the extent of the 800,000 murdered Tutsis.

The fighting which began late on the evening of April 6 did not end for another hundred days, leaving hundreds of thousands dead, missing, and displaced.

== See also ==
- Timeline of the Rwandan genocide
