= Charles Ntakirutinka =

Rwandan politician and dissdent

Transportation Minister

Personal details
- Party: Parti Démocratique de Renouveau

Charles Ntakirutinka is a former Transportation Minister in the post-genocide Rwandan government, who was later imprisoned on charges of creating civil disorder as well as planning assassinations. Amnesty International named him a prisoner of conscience and a 2011 "priority case".

== PDR-Ubuyanja ==
In May 2001, Charles Ntakirutinka helped found Le Parti Démocratique de Renouveau (Democratic Party for Renewal) or PDR-Ubuyanja with former President Pasteur Bizimungu. Bizumungu was promptly placed under house arrest by the government of current president Paul Kagame.

Ntakirutinka was arrested in April 2002 along with Bizimungu and six other men on charges of disturbing public order, provoking civil conflict and targeting government authorities for assassination. Following a 2004 trial that Amnesty International describes as "falling well short of international standards of fairness", including witness statements allegedly extracted under torture, he was sentenced to ten years in prison. Human Rights Watch also criticized the trial as "flawed", and noted Ntakirutinka's continued imprisonment in their 2009 annual report.

He appealed the ten year sentence, all the way to the Supreme Court of Rwanda. On 17 February 2006, Ntakirutinka's appeal was rejected by the Supreme Court. The Court also sanctioned new charges against the accused, including (a) the possession of a gun, (b) selling property in order to flee the country and (c) linking up with "remnant enemy" government forces operating in the Democratic Republic of the Congo.

He was released on 1 March 2012 after serving his full ten-year sentence.
