= Ethnic groups in Rwanda =

The largest ethnic groups in Rwanda are the Hutus, which make up about 85% of Rwanda's population; the Tutsis, which are 14%; and the Twa, which are around 1%. Starting with the Tutsi feudal monarchy rule of the 10th century, the Hutus were a subjugated social group. Belgian colonization also contributed to the tensions between the Hutus and Tutsis. Hutu Power ideology propagated the myth that Hutus were the superior ethnicity. The resulting tensions would eventually foster the slaughtering of Tutsis in the Rwandan genocide. Since then, policy has changed to recognize one main ethnicity: "Rwandan".

In comparison to the Hutu (4.3% B), the Tutsi have three times as much haplogroup B (14.9% B), a haplogroup found at the highest rate in different African pygmies populations.

== Genetics ==
=== Y-DNA (paternal lineages) ===
Modern-day genetic studies of the Y-chromosome generally indicate that the Batutsi, like the Bahutu, are largely of Bantu extraction (60%E1b1a, 20% B, 4% E3). Paternal genetic influences associated with the Horn of Africa and North Africa are few (16% E1b1b), and are ascribed to much earlier inhabitants who were assimilated. However, the Batutsi have considerably more Nilo-Saharan paternal lineages (14.9% B) than the Bahutu (4.3% B).

Research has found very little evidence of E1b1b in the Batutsi population (less than 3%). When compared to the Kikuyus of Kenya (a Bantu tribe with 19% evidence of E1b1b but still classified as Bantu), this percentage is negligible and does not validate the claim that they are Cushitic. It however suggests that the ancestors of Batutsi in this area may have assimilated some South Cushitic pastoralists.

=== mtDNA (maternal lineages) ===
There are no peer-reviewed genetic studies of the Batutsi's mtDNA or maternal lineages. However, Fornarino et al. (2009) report that unpublished data indicates that one Mututsi individual from Rwanda carries the India-associated mtDNA haplogroup R7.

=== Autosomal DNA (overall ancestry) ===
In general, the Batutsi appear to share a close genetic kinship with neighboring Bantu populations, particularly the Bahutu. However, it is unclear whether this similarity is primarily due to extensive genetic exchanges between these communities through intermarriage or whether it ultimately stems from common origins:

[...]generations of gene flow obliterated whatever clear-cut physical distinctions may have once existed between these two Bantu peoples – renowned to be height, body build, and facial features. With a spectrum of physical variation in the peoples, Belgian authorities legally mandated ethnic affiliation in the 1920s, based on economic criteria. Formal and discrete social divisions were consequently imposed upon ambiguous biological distinctions. To some extent, the permeability of these categories in the intervening decades helped to reify the biological distinctions, generating a taller elite and a shorter underclass, but with little relation to the gene pools that had existed a few centuries ago. The social categories are thus real, but there is little if any detectable genetic differentiation between Bahutu and Batutsi.

Tishkoff et al. (2009) found their mixed Bahutu and Batutsi samples from Rwanda to be predominately of Bantu origin, with minor gene flow from Afro-Asiatic communities (17.7% Afro-Asiatic genes found in the mixed Bahutu/Batutsi population).

== Pre-colonial background of Rwanda ==
When Europeans first explored the region around the Great Lakes of the Rift Valley in Africa that has since become Rwanda, they created an interpretation of the people found in the region as three racially distinct tribes, coexisting in a complex social order: the Tutsis, Hutus, and Twa. The Tutsis are anyone that the Europeans classified as Tutsi during colonialism because of their height. The Hutu majority, about 75% of the population, were farmers. And the Twa were a minority of 1%.

Although these groups were distinct and stratified in relation to one another, the boundary between Tutsi and Hutu was somewhat open to social mobility. The Tutsi elite were defined by their exclusive ownership of land and cattle. Hutus, however, though disenfranchised socially and politically, could shed Hutuness, or kwihutura, by accumulating wealth, and thereby rising through the social hierarchy to the status of Tutsi.

A contrasting picture of human cultural diversity was recorded in the early Rwandan oral histories, ritual texts, and biographies, in which the terms Tutsi, Hutu, and Twa were quite rarely used and had meanings different from those conceived by the Europeans. In those, the term Tutsi was equivalent to the phrase "wealthy noble"; Hutu meant "farmer"; and Twa was used to refer to people skilled in hunting, use of fire, pottery-making, guarding, etc. In contrast to the European conception, rural farmers are often described as wealthy and well-connected. Kings sometimes looked down on them but still formed marriage bonds with them and are frequently described as conferring titles, land, herds, armies, servitors, and ritual functions on them.

== Origin myths ==
Elites in pre-colonial Rwanda propagated an origin myth of the three groups to justify the hierarchical relationship of sociopolitical inequality between them in sacred, religious terms. According to this myth, Kigwa, a deity who fell from heaven, had three sons: Gatwa, Gahutu and Gatutsi. He chose an heir by giving each son the responsibility of watching over a pot of milk during the night. Gatwa drank the milk, Gahutu fell asleep and carelessly spilt his pot, and only Gatutsi kept watch, keeping his milk safe. Therefore, Kigwa appointed Gatutsi to be his successor, and Gahutu to be his brother's servant, while Gatwa was to be resigned to the status of an outsider. Gatutsi would possess cattle and power, and Gahutu would only be allowed to acquire cattle through service to Gatutsi, whereas Gatwa was condemned to the fringe of society. This myth was the basis of the hierarchical relationship that placed the Tutsi at the apex of the social pyramid: above the Hutu, who were in turn above the marginalized Twa. The prevalence of this myth became the basis of the social and political stratification of Rwanda.

From the fifteenth century, when the Tutsi arrived in what is now Rwanda as migrant pastoralists, to the onset of colonization, Rwanda was a feudal monarchy. A Tutsi monarch ruled, distributing land and political authority through hereditary chiefs whose power was manifest in their land and cattle ownership. Most of these chiefs were Tutsis. The land was farmed under an imposed system of patronage under which Tutsi chiefs demanded manual labor in return for the rights of Hutus to occupy their land. This system left Hutus with the status of serfs. Additionally, when Rwanda conquered the peoples on its borders, their ethnic identities were cast aside and they were simply labeled "Hutu". Therefore, "Hutu" became an identity that was not necessarily ethnic, but rather just associated with subjugation.

== Stratified social hierarchy ==
This social system was based on five fundamental assumptions, as reinforced through group interactions and influenced by cultural myths:

1. That there were fundamental natural differences between the groups
2. That the origin of the Tutsi was celestial
3. That the civilization that the Tutsi brought to Rwanda was superior
4. That the kingship of the Tutsi Mwami was divinely ordained and
5. That divine sanctions would occur if the monarchy was usurped by any other group.

Despite the stratification promulgated by these ideas, Rwanda was still very much a unified society. Notwithstanding association with different groups in the sociopolitical hierarchy, the inhabitants all considered themselves part of the same nation, the Banyarwanda, which means "people of Rwanda." They spoke the same language, practiced the same cultural traditions, and worshiped the same God. However, the arrival of European colonizers would later exploit group divisions as a means of securing control. The modern conception of Tutsi and Hutu as distinct ethnic groups in no way reflects the pre-colonial relationship between them. Tutsi and Hutu were simply groups occupying different places in the Rwandan social hierarchy, the division between which was exacerbated by slight differences in appearance propagated by occupation and pedigree.

== German and Belgian colonization ==
Some European intellectuals argue that the construction of divergent ethnic "Tutsi" and "Hutu" identities was formulated during the era of European colonization from the late 1880s to the 1950s. German colonialism did little to alter the existing stratified social system. The Germans were not interested in disrupting social affairs – their sole concern was the efficient extraction of natural resources and trade of profitable cash crops. Colonial bureaucrats relied heavily on native Tutsi chiefs to maintain order over the Hutu lower classes and collect taxes. Thus, the German affirmation of the stratified social structure was utilized by the Tutsi aristocracy as justification for minority rule over the lower-class Hutu masses. Germany's defeat in World War I allowed Belgian forces to conquer Rwanda. Belgian involvement in the region was far more intrusive than German administration. In an era of Social Darwinism, European anthropologists claimed to identify a distinct "Hamitic race" that was superior to native "Negroid" populations. Influenced by racialized attitudes, Belgian social scientists declared that the Tutsis, who wielded political control in Rwanda, must be descendants of the Hamites, who shared a purported closer blood line to Europeans. The Belgians concluded that the Tutsis and Hutus composed two fundamentally different ethno-racial groups. Thus, the Belgians viewed the Tutsis as more civilized, superior, but most importantly, more European than the Hutus. This perspective justified placing societal control in the hands of the Tutsis at the expense of the Hutus. Moreover, this Belgian affirmation of the Hamitic theory provided a conceptual foundation for Tutsis and Hutus to start identifying themselves as different ethnic groups. The Belgians established a comprehensive race theory that was to dictate Rwandan society until independence: Tutsi racial superiority and Hutu oppression. The institutionalization of Tutsi and Hutu ethnic divergence was accomplished through administrative, political economic, and educational means.

Primarily, Belgian colonialism stressed physical and social differences. Relentless Belgian propaganda portrayed Tutsis as the more evolved "ethnic" group in appearance, intelligence, and height, while Hutus were branded as ignorant, backwards, and vile. Tutsis naturally welcomed this ethnic schism because thinking in these racialized terms had tangible social benefits – it vindicated their minority domination over the majority Hutus. This administrative propaganda had a subconscious effect of convincing Hutus and Tutsis that they were in fact members of separate ethnic, not social groups. For Belgian colonial elites, this was a classic "divide and conquer" strategy: cleaving groups along salient social boundaries served as a mechanism in securing colonial control over indigenous groups. Initially, Belgian administrators used an expedient method of classification based on the number of cattle a person owned – anyone with ten or more cattle was considered a member of the aristocratic Tutsi class. However, the presence of wealthy Hutu was problematic. Then in 1933, the colonial administration institutionalized a more rigid ethnic classification by issuing ethnic identification cards; every Rwandan was officially branded a Tutsi, Hutu, or Twa.

== Tutsi political & economic hegemony ==
One theory suggests that Belgian promotion of Tutsi political domination served as a prime catalyst of growing ethnic resentments. The Belgians dismantled Hutu kingdoms that had maintained local control in the northwest. In 1926 the Belgians abolished the local posts of "land-chief," "cattle-chief" and "military chief," and in doing so they stripped the Hutus of their limited local power over land. Instead, they entrenched an authoritarian Tutsi aristocracy to rule over the Hutu majorities in which Tutsis took over as provincial governors, local chieftains, and civil bureaucrats. Hutu officials were excluded from local administrative structures while Hutu chieftains were systematically denied from ruling their own people as they had done for centuries before. The establishment of Tutsi minority rule created much bitterness among the Hutu majority who felt disenfranchised and politically repressed. This political resentment fueled the development of an ethnic gulf between the Tutsis who wielded political power, and the Hutus who were locked out of power.

Belgian economic policies also further increased the ethnic divide between Tutsis and Hutus. Colonial elites appropriated large land grants to Tutsis, and displaced formerly wealthy Hutu landowners. The Belgians strengthened the feudal arrangement of Rwanda's pre-colonial past by forcing Hutus to work on lands owned by Tutsis. Moreover, Tutsis were appointed as trade officials and tax collectors, further reinforcing Tutsi economic hegemony over the Hutus. Colonial policies deepened the pre-existing class stratification: Tutsis were primarily upper-class wealthy landowners and merchants, while Hutus occupied lower-class occupations as poor farmers and laborers. These deep class differences provided a framework for mapping ethnic identities on top of them: class-hatred was a prominent tool for fueling divergent ethno-nationalist ideologies. Thus, this socioeconomic stratification was a chief driver in formulating both ethnic identities: the oppression of the Hutus by the Tutsis served as a key catalyst in forming a common Hutu identity among the exploited lower classes, while the Tutsi economic supremacy over the Hutus served as a key catalyst in shaping a singular Tutsi identity among the privileged upper classes.

Lastly, the education system reinforced the bifurcation of Tutsi and Hutu ethnic identity. The Roman Catholic Church, the primary educators in the country, subscribed to the differences between Hutus and Tutsis by developing separate educational systems for each. Not surprisingly, in the 1940s and 1950s, the vast majority of students were Tutsis, even though the majority of Rwandans now self-identified as Hutus.

== Hutu race theory ==
Current anthropologists argue that the sum totality of these colonial measures fashioned a resentful inferiority complex among the Hutus. Although the Hamitic theory was jointly utilized by the Belgians and the Tutsis to systematically oppress the Hutu, the Hutu themselves internalized the hypothesis and flipped it around as a framework for viewing the Tutsi. Hutu intellectuals re-framed the race theory as a defense mechanism: Hutu inferiority evolved into rightful supremacy in Rwanda, while Tutsi superiority evolved into an illegitimate foreignness to rule in Rwanda. Tutsis were viewed not as the rightful rulers that the Belgians claimed they were, but as foreigners from northeast Africa who invaded "rightful" Hutu territories. This Hutu reconstruction of the myth of Tutsi foreignness was disseminated and propagated as a reaction to "unjust" Tutsi rule.

=== The ethnic security dilemma ===
Other theoretical frameworks can also explain the construction of ethnic divergence between Tutsis and Hutus. First, the creation of salient ethnic identities can be seen as a better mechanism of capturing class resentment on the part of Hutus; layering an ethnic dimension over class identities was a better strategy for mobilizing the masses and legitimizing resistance against upper-class, ethnically different Tutsis. Second, a reworking of Michael Mann’s security dilemma in the Rwandan case produces the "ethnic" security dilemma: Hutus perceived that the Tutsis were forming a distinct ethnic identity, pushed by the Belgians, to legitimize political control. Whether or not this perception was true, as Mann's classic security dilemma maintains, Hutus responded to this supposed "ethnic attack" by forming their own ethnic identity. In reaction to being labeled the superior ethnic group by the Belgians and in the face of rising Hutu ethnicity, the Tutsis actually accepted and internalized this ethnic label, promoting Tutsi ethnic identity as a defense. This ethnic security dilemma model is a feasible theoretical explanation for the construction of divergent ethnic identities.

Identifying when in historical time these social group differences became ethnic differences is hard to pinpoint. There was no one crystallization point. The long process of constructing ethnicity, however, continued and strengthened in post-colonial years.

== Post-colonial framework ==
The predominant American theory regarding this period is that as Belgium's era of colonial dominance over Rwanda drew to a close during the 1950s, the Hutu and Tutsi, as racial identities, had been firmly institutionalized. Manipulative racial engineering by the Belgians, and the despotic practices of the Tutsi chieftains they empowered, helped drive together the disparate Rwandan sub-classes under the "Hutu" moniker. When the Belgians were to finally leave Rwanda in the early years of the 1960s, the politics of racial and ethnic division remained. And in the following decades, regimes under both Hutu ultra-nationalists and moderate conciliators would demonstrate how the labels of Hutu and Tutsi could be molded and twisted to fit political expediency.

=== Racialization of Hutu and Tutsi identities Under Kayibanda ===
Communist intellectuals argue that despite their systematic oppression, a class of Hutu political intelligentsia influenced by contemporary communist thought emerged, forming a stance against elite rule of the proletariat masses, which was reinterpreted as Tutsi rule over the Hutu. This Hutu counter-elite exploded onto the political scene in the late 1950s as both Belgian colonial influence and their firm support of the Tutsi minority declined. The emerging Hutu counter-elite provided a voice to the majority "Hutu" people, via a series of political proclamations and, later, sweeping electoral victories. Yet the voice that emerged was one embittered by decades of subjugation; one which championed Hutu nationalism and anti-Tutsi sentiment. The result was a "Hutu political consciousness" driven by populist and nationalistic forces, with the goal of dethroning the privileged Tutsi and driving a deeper wedge between their peoples.

In 1957, these Hutu nationalist elites made their political debut when a UN mission to the region was greeted with two declarations of independence by the Rwandan people. The first, a proclamation by the Mwami's (king's) high council proposed a rapid transfer of power from the Belgians to the Tutsi royal leadership. Called Mise au Point, the document emphasized the importance of ending racial tensions between white colonizers and black colonials. One month later, the Hutu political elites responded with their own declaration, the "Bahutu Manifesto". This document called for a double liberation of the Hutu people, first from the race of white colonials, and second from the race of Hamitic oppressors, the Tutsi. The document in many ways established the future tone of the Hutu nationalist movement by identifying the "indigenous racial problem" of Rwanda as the social, political, and economic "monopoly which is held by one race, the Tutsi." The manifesto also served as a prescient omen that future political identities in Rwanda would be defined along racial identities.

At the beginning of the Social Revolution of 1959 two years later, four major political parties emerged: two Tutsi monarchist parties, Union Nationale Rwandaise (UNAR) and Rassemblement Democratique Rwandais (RADER), and two Hutu parties, the nationalist Mouvement Democratique Rwandais / Parti du Mouvement et de L’Emancipacion Hutu (MDR-PARMEHUTU), and the moderate constitutionalists L’Association pour la Promotion Sociale de la Masse (APROSOMA). This marked the first time in Rwandan history that such stark party identification had emerged along exclusively ethnic lines. Not all parties championed segregation of the Hutu and Tutsi people, yet the divide ensured that the socio-political differentiation pioneered under colonialism would continue to flourish in independence.

In the ensuing provisional elections, the nationalist party of Grégoire Kayibanda (MDR-PARMEHUTU) rose to the fore. This victory gave PARMEHUTU an apparent mandate to initiate their program of segregation and discrimination against the Tutsi. Soon, Kayibanda would find the political cover he needed to consolidate control over Rwandan politics and excise the Tutsi from the political arena. In November and December 1963, a series of small cross border raids were carried out by expatriated Tutsi who had fled Rwanda between 1959 and 1963, during the tumultuous rise of Hutu nationalist politics. These exiles, publicly termed the inyenzi, ("cockroaches") by Kayibandi, were portrayed by the Hutu government as different from the domestic Tutsi only by the extremism of their political beliefs, and thus domestic Tutsi were often suspected of being collaborators in the raids. Building on this suspicion, PARMEHUTU overtly demonized and excised the Tutsi minority, politically and socially, in the wake of the 1963 raids. Disorganized reprisal killings against Tutsi were carried out at the local level, with minimal government intervention. Kayibandi, meanwhile, ordered the execution of almost two dozen leading moderate Tutsi political figures, effectively decapitating the domestic Tutsi opposition parties. This left the extremist Tutsi in exile as the only remaining Tutsi political force in the region, and prime targets for future demonization.

By the end of 1963, PARMEHUTU had established its political supremacy in Rwanda, with Kayibanda as president. Also established, in the public view, was the ever-present threat of external Tutsi invasion, the suspicion of which often translated to reprisals against the domestic Tutsi population. By 1964, Kayibandi had stepped in to quell the reprisal killings, but the sociopolitical position of the Tutsi minority continued to diminish. Under the ensuing decade of PARMEHUTU rule, all Tutsi were removed from public office, their enrollment in the public education system was curtailed, and they were relegated to second-class citizen status. Perhaps most importantly, the government continued, via official literature and the public education system, to characterize the Hutu/Tutsi divide as racial in nature, not ethnic. The purpose of this distinction was that, via a "racial" differentiation, Tutsi could be characterized as alien, non-indigenous, and thus not genuine Rwandan nationals; whereas ethnic differentiations could perceivably exist within a single national identity. Under Kayibanda, domestic Tutsi were viewed not as Rwandan citizens by the Hutu government, but as domestic aliens to be tolerated; participatory in civil life, yet removed from the political sphere and from its corresponding rights and protections.

== Ethnization of Hutu/Tutsi identity under Habyarimana ==
In July 1973 a Tutsi massacre of Hutu elites in neighboring Burundi triggered another flare-up of domestic racial tension in Rwanda, in which domestic Tutsi were again blamed for the actions of their foreign "counterparts." As was the case in 1963, political and physical reprisals were initiated against domestic Tutsis, beginning with the black-listing of Tutsi students from state universities, and spreading to broader society.

Eventually, domestic violence and disruption became so severe that Major General Juvénal Habyarimana led the army in a coup, overthrowing the nationalistic PARMEHUTU regime and establishing the second republic. The second republic, a single-party military regime under Habyarimana, sought to roll back the racializing policies of his predecessor responsible for domestic discord. The Hutu/Tutsi divide was reclassified by the government as "ethnic," not racial, and the moratorium on Tutsi government participation was lifted (but Tutsi participation in government remained low). Quota systems were established for ethnic participation in education and public sector jobs; attempting to proportionally distribute participation between the Hutu and Tutsi ethnic groups. In this case, however, participation for the historically better educated Tutsi remained inflated. In his stated quest to redress historical wrongs, Habyarimana committed the government to a policy of "reconciliation." However, a reclassification of the Hutu/Tutsi differentiation from racial to ethnic was not equivalent to a repudiation of the differentiation itself, and discrimination was still prevalent in society and policy. Although the "Tutsi" were defined by the state as an ethnic minority, they were denied recognition as a protected minority and remained conspicuously absent from elected offices. Some vestiges of the old regime remained codified as well, such as the law that Hutu military officials were not allowed to marry Tutsi women. As well, Habyarimana assured the Hutu majority that a Hutu leader would always be the "leader and protector" of the republic. Thus, Juvénal Habyarimana still defined the terms of the "reconciliation" as Tutsis remained politically subservient under his regime.

Perhaps most insidiously, however, was how the transition to the Habyarimana regime illustrated the ease and means by which Rwandan national regimes could redraw and manipulate the racial/ethnic divisions of their own people in order to fit their own political agendas. Despite years of relative peace following the formation of the 2nd republic, Habyarimana's goals of reconciliation ultimately failed. Hutu/Tutsi differences remained codified in law. When Habyarimana's government began the transition to a democratic system in the late 1980s, it was perhaps inevitable that divisions would manifest once again along Hutu/Tutsi lines. As well, popular Hutu resentment at the disproportional representation of Tutsi in the quota system meant that friction between the groups never truly dissipated. Some political scientists credit these failures as a few of the reasons why Rwanda so quickly slipped back into political turmoil along ethnic lines in the years immediately preceding the 1994 genocide.

== Ethnic identity cards in contemporary Rwanda ==
In 1933 Rwanda's Belgian administration issued identity cards—a policy that would remain for over a half-a-century and one that would not create ethnicity, but instead would ensure its proof and social salience. These instruments of documentation would be key in fomenting Rwanda's devastating genocide in 1994.

During the early 1990s the Hutus—who comprised a significant majority of the Rwandan population—were being manipulated as political tools by President Juvénal Habyarimana's regime. Under an imposed order to democratize, Habyarimana rallied the majority Hutus against what he depicted as their racial enemy—the Tutsis—in a measure to prevent both regional and class division from becoming politically relevant issues. Thus, this political climate ensured that national identity would be defined singularly across ethnic lines—a dangerous prelude to the ensuing genocide. The tense situation became inflamed with Habyarimana's mysterious death in 1994. Quickly, Hutu administration implemented a policy to kill any and all Tutsi—a process believed to be simplified by identity cards.

== Flexibility of ethnic identification ==
Identity cards became the subject of paranoia as this form of identification allowed the reinvention of personal identity through illegal forging; during the genocide, "mistakes" were often made because of this flexibility in identity. In particular, because a Rwandan's ethnic identity was solely traced through paternal lineage, there was considerable difficulty in establishing true paternity. Furthermore, inter-marriage particularly in the Southern region of the country furthered suspicion over Hutu or Tutsi paternity. Though forging was rare, the doubt over ethnic identity served as proof that unlike the rhetoric of Rwandan government, and that of the preceding Belgian colonizers, ethnicity was not primordialist in nature. Instead, ethnicity was a socially-constructed, superimposed identity that could potentially be changed, regardless of identity card issuance.

=== Political power ===
==== Official policy ====
The end of the Rwandan Civil War resulted in a Tutsi government gaining power—the Rwandan Patriotic Front (RPF). The Rwandan government introduced a policy that placed less focus on ethnic identity. Ethnic labels were removed from official discourse, and citizens were encouraged to identify simply as "Rwandans" rather than as Hutu, Tutsi, or Twa. This idea was also promoted through the Ndi Umunyarwanda ("I am Rwandan") campaign, which aimed to build a shared national identity. Supporters of the policy argue that it was intended to reduce ethnic divisions following the genocide, during which identification as Tutsi meant "near-certain death". Even so, some scholars argue that the policy also benefits the government by making ethnic inequalities less noticeable. Political scientist Filip Reyntjens has argued that the RPF's rejection of official ethnic categories "hides less benign purposes that bear a resemblance to pre-1959 Rwanda and Burundi in the 1970s and 1980s". He also points to Burundi under President Jean-Baptiste Bagaza, where ethnic identity was officially downplayed while Tutsis continued to dominate state institutions and Hutus reported discrimination. Based on this, Reyntjens argues that Rwanda is an example of ethnocratic rule because the lack of official ethnic categories covers up, rather than removes, ethnic inequality.

==== Representation in state institutions and civil society and non-state institutions ====
In a study published in 2021, Reyntjens examined the ethnic composition of 199 senior office holders whose ethnicity he considered identifiable. According to his analysis, 164 office holders (approximately 82%) were Tutsi and 35 (18%) were Hutu. Cabinet ministers were more ethnically diverse than many other institutions, with 19 Tutsi ministers (63.3%) and 11 Hutu ministers. However, Reyntjens argued that real administrative authority often rests with permanent secretaries, particularly where ministers are not members of the RPF. He reported that, with the exception of the Ministry of Foreign Affairs, ministries headed by Hutu or non-RPF ministers were paired with RPF-affiliated Tutsi permanent secretaries. Among permanent secretaries, 12 were Tutsi, and six were Hutu.

According to Reyntjens, ethnic disparities become more pronounced in institutions with lower public visibility. He reported that 31 of Rwanda's 36 ambassadors (86%) were Tutsi. Within the Office of the President, he found that all senior officials were Tutsi and were also former refugees. In the armed forces and security services, 13 of 15 senior leadership positions (86.7%) were held by Tutsi. Leadership positions in major state-owned enterprises and public agencies were similarly dominated by Tutsi officials, with 24 of 25 positions identified in his survey. Reyntjens also argued that similar patterns extended beyond the state, noting that the leadership of major religious denominations, national sports federations, and media organizations was overwhelmingly Tutsi.

Reyntjens argues that the RPF consolidated its influence over civil society shortly after taking power by encouraging or requiring non-state organizations to accept leaders approved by the government. He describes this as a continuation of longstanding patterns of state-society relations in Rwanda. Historian Timothy Longman similarly argues that a "cosy relation between church and state and a practice of playing ethnic politics" has characterized Rwandan politics since the introduction of Christianity.

Ethnic disparities are also evident at the local level. Among 29 district mayors whose ethnicity Reyntjens identified, 20 were Tutsi and nine were Hutu. He also argues that effective authority in many districts rests with military and intelligence officials, whom he describes as being overwhelmingly Tutsi. Reyntjens contends that these patterns have developed progressively since the RPF came to power rather than emerging only in recent years. He cites surveys conducted in 2000 and 2002 that found Tutsi occupied approximately 119 (or about 70%) and 252 (about 63%), respectively, of senior state positions. A 2008 assessment by the United States Embassy in Kigali reportedly concluded that approximately two-thirds of 118 senior government positions in ministries, parastatals, and regulatory bodies were held by Tutsi. Another study covering the period between 1996 and 2016 found an increasing concentration of executive, military, police, judicial, and provincial positions among Tutsi officials, concluding that, unlike neighboring Burundi, one ethnic group exercised dominant influence across all major branches of government.

==== Former refugees, composition of the Tutsi elite, public perceptions, and reconciliation ====
Reyntjens also argues that ethnic representation within the Tutsi elite is uneven. Among 144 Tutsi office holders whose geographical origins he identified, 106 (73.6%) were former refugees who had returned after years in exile, while only 38 were genocide survivors. He suggests that this indicates a preference for former refugees over survivors in appointments to senior positions. Reyntjens cautions against treating the Tutsi population as a politically unified group. He notes that Tutsi figures considered insufficiently loyal to the RPF have, according to various reports, been imprisoned, forced into exile, impoverished, or killed. He argues that political exclusion in Rwanda continues to reflect not only ethnicity but also factors such as "regional favouritism, kinship bonds, mercantile interests, or political considerations". Reyntjens says that the larger number of Tutsis in leadership positions is not necessarily only because of ethnic favoritism, but nepotism may also be an important reason, just as it was under earlier governments. Because the RPF leadership is mostly made up of Tutsi former refugees, especially those who returned from Uganda, this background may help explain why they hold many of the country's top positions.

There is little evidence of systematic ethnic discrimination in technocratic governance, such as health care and education. Reyntjens suggests that the government's emphasis on socioeconomic development requires extending public services broadly across the population regardless of ethnicity. The government-funded Fonds d'assistance aux rescapés du génocide (FARG) provides financial assistance, educational support, health care, and housing specifically to officially recognized genocide survivors. According to government figures cited by Reyntjens, FARG has supported approximately 100,000 secondary-school students, financed university education for more than 33,000 students, funded over two million medical treatments, and constructed approximately 44,000 houses. Reyntjens argues, however, that because official survivor status is generally limited to Tutsi victims of the genocide, Hutu who suffered violence, including abuses attributed to the RPF, are excluded from these benefits, a policy that some Hutu interviewees described as discriminatory. Political scientist Anuradha Chakravarty argues that many respondents expressed remorse for violence committed against Tutsi while simultaneously reporting fear, resentment, and perceptions of unequal treatment by the post-genocide state. According to Chakravarty, these attitudes often differentiated between ordinary Tutsi, regarded primarily as victims, and members of the political elite.

The Rwandan government maintains that its policies have contributed significantly to national reconciliation. The 2020 Rwanda Reconciliation Barometer reported that 94.7% of respondents considered the country reconciled, but Reyntjens argues that "though ethnicity has been banned from the public discourse, it has become an invisible variable that remains a central factor in Rwandan social identity, and even that the Hutu-Tutsi distinction is more rigid than ever". Many Hutu privately perceive the post-1994 political order as a restoration of Tutsi dominance resembling the pre-1959 period. Although formal ethnic quotas used under previous governments have been abolished, they have effectively been replaced by informal patterns of ethnic preference in appointments to positions of power.

Several scholars have argued that such patterns may have implications for Rwanda's long-term political stability. Mahmood Mamdani underlined the regime's conviction that "Tutsi power is the minimum condition for Tutsi survival", and warned that "the Tutsification of state institutions cannot be an effective guarantee against a repeat of genocidal violence in Rwandan society. If anything, it will keep alive the spectre of yet another round of genocidal violence". Similarly, the 2008 United States Embassy assessment, which found that Tutsis held about two-thirds of the 118 senior government positions, concluded that the continued predominance of Tutsi officials in senior government positions was inconsistent with official rhetoric rejecting ethnic identities and suggested that Hutu participation in government would be necessary to overcome Rwanda's historical divisions. Reyntjens argues that subsequent developments have reinforced these patterns rather than changed them, and ethnic differences in political representation remain an important part of Rwanda's political system, despite official efforts to promote a shared national identity.

== See also ==
- Ethnic groups in Burundi
