= Juvénal Rugambarara =

Rwandan politician

Juvénal Rugambarara is a former mayor of Bicumi in the now-defunct Kigali Rural province (Bicumbi now resides mostly in Rwamagana). He succeeded Laurent Semanza as mayor of the commune on 16 September 1993. He was involved in planning, incitement and arms distribution to the Interahamwe during the Rwandan genocide in 1994. Soon afterward, he fled to the Democratic Republic of the Congo, where he spent three years in hiding. However, when the First Congo War erupted in the DRC in 1997, he then fled to Uganda, assumed a pseudonym and became a tobacco farmer. He was arrested in 2003 by Interpol, and was sentenced to 11 years in prison by the International Criminal Tribunal for Rwanda for his involvement in the genocide. He will serve his sentence in France.

He was granted early release on 8 February 2012.
