= Sylvestre Nsanzimana =

Rwandese politician

2nd Prime Minister of Rwanda
- In office 12 October 1991 – 2 April 1992
- President: Juvénal Habyarimana
- Preceded by: Grégoire Kayibanda (Note: 1962)
- Succeeded by: Dismas Nsengiyaremye

Personal details
- Born: 5 January 1936 Gikongoro, Rwanda, (now Gikongoro, Nyamagabe, Rwanda)
- Died: 1999 (aged 62–63) Brussels, Belgium
- Party: National Republican Movement for Democracy and Development
- Spouse: Lea Nsanzimana
- Children: 4

Sylvestre Nsanzimana (5 January 1936 in Gikongoro Province, Rwanda – 1999) was the Prime Minister of Rwanda from 12 October 1991 to 2 April 1992. He belonged to the National Republican Movement for Democracy and Development and previously served as minister of justice in the government of Juvénal Habyarimana. He stepped down as prime minister following the refusal of opposition parties to take part in the government.

== Other works ==
He also served as Rwanda's Minister of Foreign Affairs from 1969 to 1971. He was also a director at a university.

== Personal life and family ==
Sylvestre Nsanzimana was married. He had 4 children. With his family, they lived for over 10 years in Ethiopia where the children schooled in Lycée Guébré-Mariam and returned to Rwanda. His wife died of illness in 1988. He died in 1999 of illness in Belgium.

== Notes ==
Preceded by Post Abolished	Prime Minister of Rwanda; October 12, 1991 – April 2, 1992	Succeeded by Dismas Nsengiyaremye
