= Village Urugwiro =

Residence in Kigali, Rwanda

Coordinates: 1.9396443°S 30.0820844°E

Village Urugwiro (English: Village Hospitality) is the office residence of the President of Rwanda. It is also where the president receives and entertains state guests.

The complex is located in the Kacyiru area of Rwanda's capital Kigali. It was originally built to accommodate the 6th Franco-African Summit in May 1979.
