= Théodore Sindikubwabo =

Rwandan politician (1928–1998)

- Portrait, date unknown

Interim President of Rwanda
- In office 8 April 1994 – 19 July 1994
- Leader: Theoneste Bagosora
- Prime Minister: Jean Kambanda
- Preceded by: Juvénal Habyarimana
- Succeeded by: Pasteur Bizimungu

Personal details
- Born: 1928 Butare, Ruanda-Urundi
- Died: March 1998 (aged 69–70) Bukavu, Democratic Republic of the Congo
- Cause of death: Unknown
- Party: National Republican Movement for Democracy and Development
- Education: University of Rwanda (Medicine)

Théodore Sindikubwabo (1928 – March 1998) was a Rwandan politician who was the interim President of Rwanda during the Rwandan genocide, from 8 April to 19 July 1994. Prior to that, he was President of the Rwandan legislature National Development Council from 1988–1994.

Sindikubwabo was born in Zivu, Shyanda village, in the town of Butare, formerly called Astrida in Rwanda-Urundi Territory, and currently the southern province of Rwanda. Sindikubwabo was educated as a physician and was Minister of Health in the administration of President Kayibanda. Following the takeover by Juvénal Habyarimana, Sindikubwabo became a practising pediatrician in Kigali Central Hospital. He later returned to politics as a deputy in parliament.

Immediately following the assassinations of Habyarimana on 6 April 1994 and Prime Minister Agathe Uwilingiyimana on 7 April, Sindikubwabo was installed as interim President by the Crisis Committee controlled by Colonel Théoneste Bagosora, and he was the head of state during the genocide. On 19 April 1994, Sindikubwabo made a now-infamous speech at the ceremony appointing a new Préfet (Governor) of Butare that was broadcast on national radio, in which he insulted those who were not "working", a euphemism for killing Tutsis, and told them to "get out of the way and let us work". On 29 April, he returned to Butare and told the populace that he was there to supervise the killing of Tutsis. On 18 May, whilst on a visit to Kibuye Prefecture, he congratulated the people on how well they had done their "work".

Taking advantage of his medical knowledge, he advised the military to cut a certain vein on the jugular to cause certain death.

Following the invasion of the Rwandan Patriotic Front that took control of the country and ended the genocide, Sindikubwabo fled to Zaire (now the Democratic Republic of the Congo), where he lived in exile in Bukavu. In April 1995, he started Rassemblement Républicain pour la Démocratie au Rwanda (RDR) to attack Rwanda, under the RPF regime. He was initially reported to have been killed by the Rwandan government attack on Bukavu in November 1996 at the beginning of the First Congo War, but subsequent reports put him in Kinshasa. Later, he was killed by his bodyguard, in Shanji-Kalehe territory in March 1998 and was never charged by the International Criminal Tribunal for Rwanda.

== Footnotes ==
Political offices
| Preceded by Juvénal Habyarimana | President of Rwanda; 9 April 1994 – 19 July 1994 | Succeeded by Pasteur Bizimungu |
