= Charles Murigande =

Rwandan politician

Ambassador of Rwanda to Japan
- In office August 2011 - April 2015

Minister of Education
- In office 2009 - 2011
- Succeeded by: Pierre Habumuremyi

Minister of Government Affairs
- In office 2008 - 2009

Minister of Foreign Affairs
- In office 2002 - 2008
- Succeeded by: Rosemary Museminali

Personal details
- Born: August 15, 1958 (age 68)
- Education: Facultés Universitaires Notre-Dame de la Paix (PhD)

Charles Murigande (born August 15, 1958) is a Rwandan political veteran (currently in retirement) who served in the government of Rwanda as Minister of Foreign Affairs from 2002 to 2008, as Minister of Governmental Affairs from 2008 to 2009, and as Minister of Education from 2009 to 2011. His last position was a Deputy Vice-Chancellor in charge of Institutional Advancement of the University of Rwanda. Prior to being appointed to his current post, he served as Ambassador of Rwanda to Japan with concurrent accreditation to Australia, New Zealand, Thailand and the Philippines from August 2011 to April 2015. Murigande is the Chairman of the Kepler College’s Governance Council.

== Early life and education ==
Murigande was born in Butare, Rwanda. In 1960 following the civil strife that preceded Rwanda's independence, his family fled to Burundi, where he grew up as refugee. He did his primary, secondary and part of his university education in Burundi. He did his graduate and post-graduate studies in Belgium where he obtained in 1986 (with the Greatest Distinction/Sum Cum Laude), a Ph.D in Mathematics from the Facultés Universitaires Notre Dame de la Paix, in Namur.

== Career ==
From 1986 to 1988 he worked as a scientific adviser to the Director General of the Geographical Institute of Burundi (IGEBU) and was at the same time Head of the Computing Center of the Institute.

He joined Howard University, Washington D.C., U.S.A. in January 1989 as a Post-doctoral fellow, where he later became an Assistant Professor and Head of the Biostatistical Division of College of Medicine.

Following the 1994 genocide in Rwanda which claimed about one million lives, Murigande abandoned his academic career at Howard University and went back to Rwanda to contribute to the reconstruction of his country. During the Rwandan Civil War, he was the Spokesperson of the Rwandan Patriotic Front (RPF) in the United States.

Since 1994, Murigande has served in the following positions:

- From September 1994 to August 1995, Adviser to the President on Foreign Affairs
- From September 1995 to March 1997, Minister of Transport and Communications
- From April 1997 to May 1998, Rector of the National University of Rwanda
- Murigande was elected Secretary General of the Rwandan Patriotic Front (RPF) on February 15, 1998 and was reelected on December 23, 2002
- On November 15, 2002, Murigande became Minister of Foreign Affairs and Regional Cooperation

After more than five years as Foreign Minister, Murigande was moved to the position of Minister of Governmental Affairs in the government named on March 8, 2008. He was moved to the post of Minister of Education on July 26, 2009.

Murigande was Minister of Education for nearly two years before being replaced by Pierre Habumuremyi in May 2011. He was then appointed as Ambassador to Japan. He presented his credentials to Emperor Akihito on 4 October 2011.

During his academic life, Murigande has published several papers in international peer-reviewed Scientific Journals.
