= Anastase Murekezi =

Rwandan politician

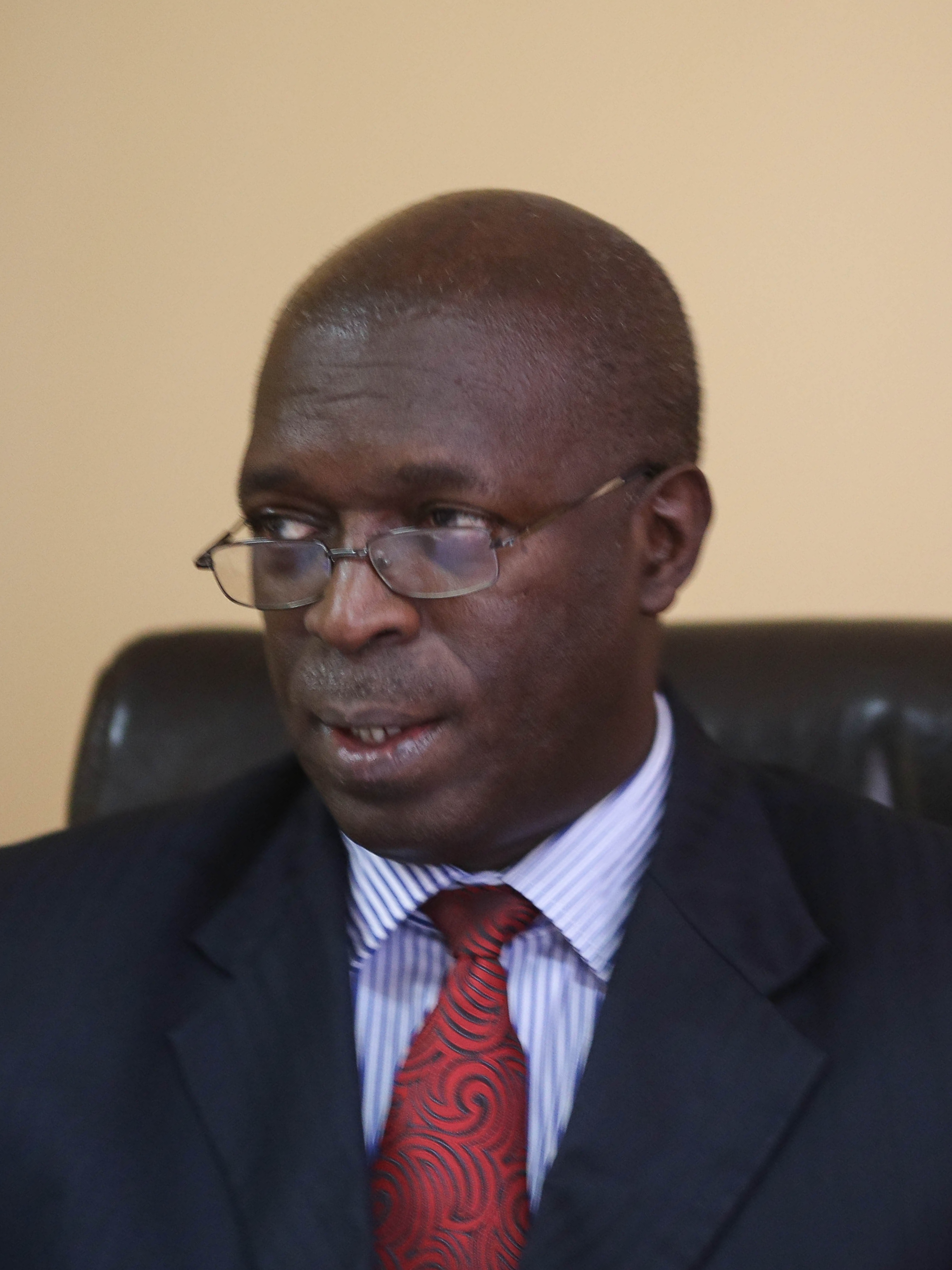

10th Prime Minister of Rwanda
- In office 24 July 2014 – 30 August 2017
- President: Paul Kagame
- Preceded by: Pierre-Damien Habumuremyi
- Succeeded by: Edouard Ngirente

Personal details
- Born: 15 June 1952 (age 73); Nyaruguru District, Rwanda
- Political party: Social Democratic Party
- Spouse: Marie Byukusenge
- Education: Catholic University of Louvain (BSc)

Anastase Murekezi (born 15 June 1952) is a Rwandan politician. He studied in Groupe Scolaire Officiel de Butare (GSOB) and went on to the Catholic University of Louvain in Belgium to study agriculture. He was the Minister of Public Service and Labor until 23 July 2014 when he became Prime Minister of Rwanda, serving until 2017. From 2017-2020, he served as Ombudsman of Rwanda.

== International associations ==
Anastase Murekezi is also a member of the Leadership Council of Compact2025, a partnership that develops and disseminates evidence-based advice to politicians and other decision-makers aimed at ending hunger and undernutrition in the coming 10 years.

Political offices
Preceded by Pierre Habumuremyi	Prime Minister of Rwanda; 2014–2017	Succeeded by Edouard Ngirente
