= Pierre Habumuremyi =

9th Prime Minister of Rwanda

Pierre-Damien Habumuremyi
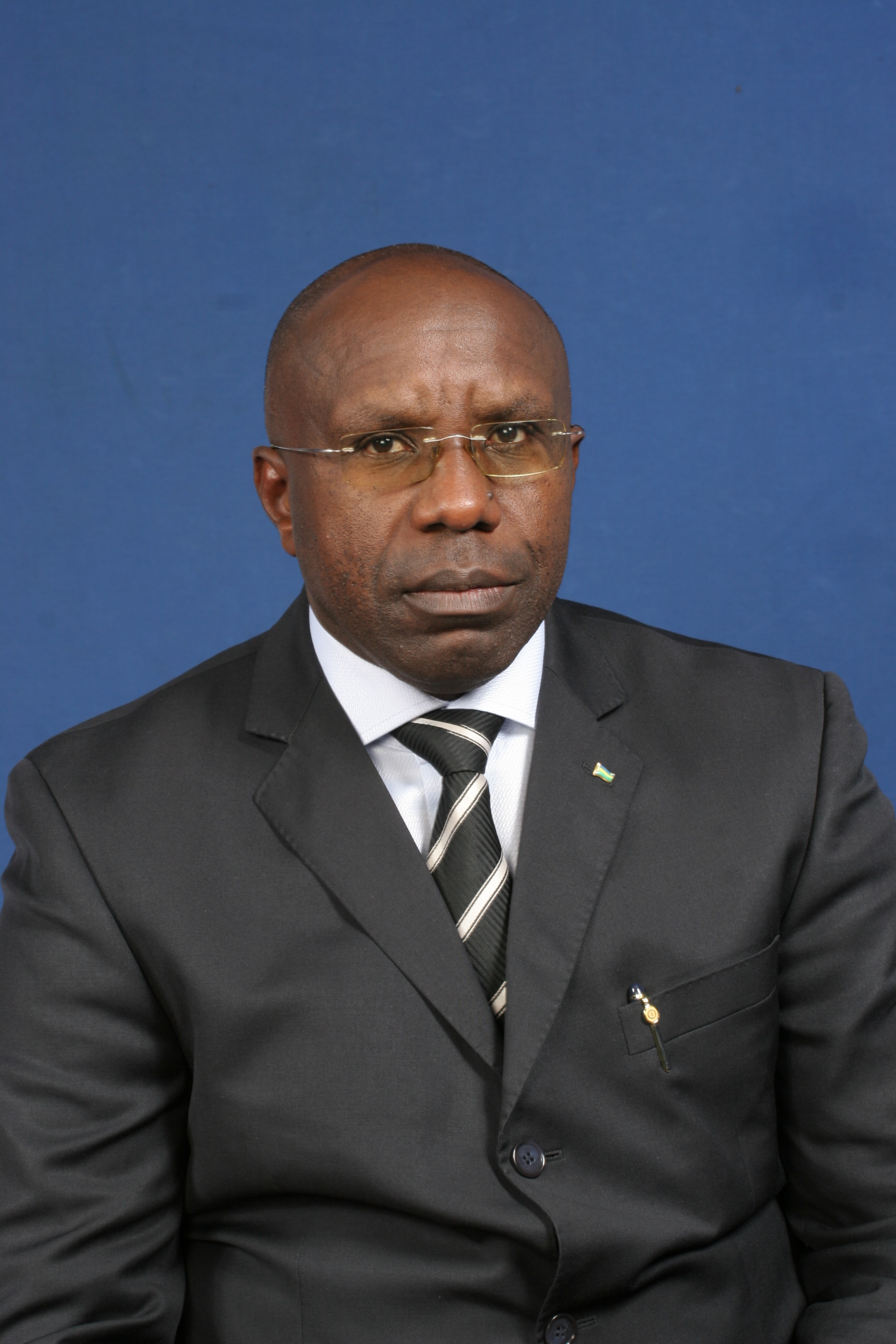

9th Prime Minister of Rwanda
- In office 7 October 2011 – 24 July 2014
- President: Paul Kagame
- Preceded by: Bernard Makuza
- Succeeded by: Anastase Murekezi

Personal details
- Born: 20 February 1961 (age 65) Ruhondo, Musanze District, Rwanda
- Party: Rwandan Patriotic Front
- Spouse: Petronilla Musabyimana
- Education: University of Lubumbashi; Panthéon-Assas University; University of Ouagadougou

Pierre-Damien Habumuremyi (born 20 February 1961) is a Rwandan politician who served as Prime Minister of Rwanda from 7 October 2011 until 24 July 2014. He previously served as Minister of Education from May 2011 to October 2011.

== Early life ==
Pierre-Damien Habumuremyi was born in 1961 in Ruhondo, Musanze District. He studied in a number of countries, including the Democratic Republic of Congo, France, and Burkina Faso. He obtained a B.Sc. in sociology, before completing his post-graduation at the University of Lubumbashi in 1993. He then completed M.Sc. in political science from the Panthéon-Assas University in 2003. He earned a Ph.D. in political science from the University of Ouagadougou in 2011.

== Career ==
Pierre Habumuremyi started his career as an academic, serving as the assistant professor at the National University of Rwanda from 1993 to 1999, and also served as a lecturer at the Kigali Independent University and the Kigali Lay Adventist University during 1997-1999. During this period, he also worked as a project coordinator at German Technical Assistance programme (GTZ Kigali) during 1995-1997 and a Senior Project Manager for the Catholic Relief Services during 1997-2000.

From 2000 to 2003, he was the Deputy Executive Secretary of the National Electoral Commission of Rwanda, after which he served as the Executive Secretary until 2008. Habumuremyi was elected as one of Rwanda's nine representatives in the East African Legislative Assembly on 11 May 2008. He was succeeded as Executive Secretary of the National Electoral Commission by Charles Munyaneza in July 2008.

Pierre-Damien Habumuremyi was subsequently appointed to the Rwandan government as minister of education in May 2011, replacing Charles Murigande.

He was appointed as prime minister on 6 October 2011. His appointment came as a surprise, given his relatively low profile on the political scene. He was succeeded by Anastase Murekezi on 23 July 2014.

He has written a book The Political integration in Rwanda after the 1994 genocide: Utopia or Reality, which was published by the Palotti Press, Kigali, in 2008.

Political offices
Preceded by Bernard Makuza	Prime Minister of Rwanda; 2011–2014	Succeeded by Anastase Murekezi
