= Vice President of Rwanda =

Vice President of Rwanda (French: Vice-président rwandais, Kinyarwanda: visiperezida) was a political position in Rwanda created for Paul Kagame from July 1994 to April 2000. The office was abolished in 2000.

The position also existed in Rwandan constitution from 1961 until 1973. However, the position was never fulfilled between 1961 and 1969.

== List of vice presidents of Rwanda ==
No.	Portrait	Name (Birth–Death)	Term of office		Ethnic group	Political party
No.	Portrait	Name (Birth–Death)	Took office	Left office	Ethnic group	Political party
Vice President of Rwanda
1		Paul Kagame (born 1957)	19 July 1994	22 April 2000	Tutsi	RPF
