= Dismas Nsengiyaremye =

Rwandan politician

3rd Prime Minister of Rwanda
- In office 2 April 1992 – 18 July 1993
- President: Juvénal Habyarimana
- Preceded by: Sylvestre Nsanzimana
- Succeeded by: Agathe Uwilingiyimana

Personal details
- Born: 1945 (age 80–81) Gitarama, Kayenzi, Rwanda
- Party: MDR

Dismas Nsengiyaremye (born 1945) was the Prime Minister of Rwanda from 2 April 1992 to 18 July 1993.

A native of Gitarama, he was a member of the Republican Democratic Movement and was appointed prime minister following an agreement between President Juvénal Habyarimana and the political opposition. During his term, he appointed Agathe Uwilingiyimana to the Ministry of Education, though she later succeeded him as prime minister.

When it was revealed in February 1993 that the army was compiling lists of alleged "accomplices" of the Rwandan Patriotic Front, Nsengiyaremye protested against what he called a "witch hunt". Nsengiyaremye fled to Europe not long after he was replaced as prime minister in 1993, citing threats to his life. He lives in exile in Belgium.

Preceded by Sylvestre Nsanzimana	Prime Minister of Rwanda; April 2, 1992 – July 18, 1993	Succeeded by Agathe Uwilingiyimana
