= Republican Democratic Movement =

Rwandan political party

Republican Democratic Movement Mouvement démocratique républicain
- Founded: 1991
- Dissolved: 2003
- Succeeded by: Party for Progress and Concord
- Headquarters: Kigali, Rwanda
- Ideology: Moderates: Hutu nationalism; Pro-Arusha Accords; Hardliners: Hutu Power; Anti-Arusha Accords
- Political position: Moderates: Right-wing; Hardliners: Far-right

The Republican Democratic Movement (French: Mouvement démocratique républicain, MDR) was a political party in Rwanda.

== History ==
The party was established in 1991, after the National Republican Movement for Democracy and Development (MRND) lost its monopoly on politics and opposition parties were legalised. The MDR took its name from MDR-Parmehutu, the ruling party in the early 1960s. Like Parmehutu, the MDR's primary base of political support was Hutus in the centre of the country, particularly Kayibanda's home prefecture of Gitarama.

In late 1991, the MDR joined with the Liberal Party and the Social Democratic Party to form an opposition coalition that placed pressure on President Juvénal Habyarimana and the MRND to implement democratic reforms. In March 1992 Habyarimana named a multiparty government with a prime minister, Dismas Nsengiyaremye, from the MDR. He was succeeded as prime minister in July 1993 by another MDR member, Agathe Uwilingiyimana.

The MDR was ostensibly moderate but developed numerous extremist factions which professed Hutu Power beliefs. The most prominent extremist faction of the MDR was led by the party's vice president, Froduald Karamira, who was later executed for his participation in the 1994 Rwandan genocide.

After its victory in the Rwandan Civil War in 1994, the Rwandan Patriotic Front (RPF) named a new Broad Based Government of National Unity with the MDR's Faustin Twagiramungu as prime minister. He remained in office until 1995. In 2001, the MDR's Bernard Makuza was named prime minister.

With elections scheduled for mid-2003, the MDR was the only opposition party able to challenge the RPF. However, on 15 April 2003, Parliament voted to dissolve the party and accused it of being "divisionist". Several former MDR members formed the Party for Progress and Concord later that year.
