= Jean Kambanda =

Rwandan politician

5th Prime Minister of Rwanda
- In office April 9, 1994 – July 19, 1994
- President: Théodore Sindikubwabo
- Preceded by: Agathe Uwilingiyimana
- Succeeded by: Faustin Twagiramungu

Personal details
- Born: October 19, 1955 (age 71) Huye, Rwanda
- Party: Republican Democratic Movement
- Education: National University of Rwanda
- Occupation: Politician, banker, and former prime minister
- Criminal information
- Status: Imprisoned in Mali
- Criminal charges: Genocide and crimes against humanity
- Penalty: Life imprisonment

Details
- Date apprehended: 18 July 1997
- Imprisoned at: Sébikotane Prison, Senagal

Jean Kambanda (born October 19, 1955) is a Hutu, Rwandan former politician who served as the Prime Minister of Rwanda in the caretaker government from the start of the 1994 Genocide against the Tutsi. He is the only head of government to plead guilty to genocide, in the first group of such convictions since the Convention on the Prevention and Punishment of the Crime of Genocide came into effect in 1951.

Kambanda holds a degree in commercial engineering and began his career as a low-level United Popular BPR banker, rising as a technocrat to become the chair of the bank. At the time of the April 1994 crisis he was vice president of the Butare section of the opposition Republican Democratic Movement (MDR).

He was sworn in as prime minister on April 9, 1994 after the president Juvénal Habyarimana and prime minister Agathe Uwilingiyimana, were both assassinated. He remained in the post for the hundred days of the genocide until July 19, 1994. After leaving office he fled the country.

== Criminal responsibility ==
Kambanda was arrested in Nairobi on July 18, 1997, after a seven-week multinational stakeout and transferred to the International Criminal Tribunal for Rwanda. The court accused him of distributing small arms and ammunition in Butare and Gitarama with the knowledge that they would be used to massacre civilians. He was found guilty after pleading guilty, a plea he later rescinded, but which rescission the Court did not accept.

On September 4, 1998, the ICTR condemned Jean Kambanda to life imprisonment for:

- Genocide, and Agreement to commit genocide
- Incitement to genocide
- Aiding and abetting genocide
- Failing in his duty to prevent the genocide which occurred while he was prime minister
- Two counts of crimes against humanity

Joy Mukanyange, the Rwandan Ambassador to Tanzania, was the only Rwandan official who attended the sentencing. She thought it was fair that Kambanda received a life sentence and his crimes had been recognized by the international community. She noted that Rwanda was "not looking for revenge".

This verdict was upheld by the ICTR Appeal Chamber on October 19, 2000, and Kambanda is currently serving life sentence in Sébikotane Prison in Senegal

=== Blaming the army ===
Although Kambanda pleaded guilty after receiving legal counsel, his lawyer argued that the prime minister was a "puppet" of the military, who had dragged him from his bank, after killing the previous prime minister, to legitimize their control of their country. He asked the ICTR for a sentence of two years because he acted "under duress with limited responsibility".

The court concluded that this defense against a charge of genocide was irrelevant.

In 2006 he testified for the defence of Colonel Theoneste Bagosora in the 'Military 1' trial of senior military leaders. That testimony was the former Prime Minister's first and only public testimony on the 1994 events in Rwanda and in which he said that he had never found a plan to commit genocide. The decisions of the ICTR regarding Kambanda have been subject to criticism.

=== Responsible but not guilty ===
In his appeal, Kambanda said that his confession had been in error, due to poor or misunderstood counsel. He said that his objective was not to plead guilty but to tell the truth. According to the ICTR appeal:

"Kambanda noted that while he felt politically responsible for what happened, he did not feel guilty at the time and does not feel guilty now."

== Legal legacy ==
As a head of government convicted by an international court, Kambanda is an important figure, with the verdict against him forming a precedent against the legal principle of State Immunity (which was used to reject an extradition order for Augusto Pinochet, for example).

Preceded by Agathe Uwilingiyimana	Prime Minister of Rwanda; April 9, 1994 – July 19, 1994	Succeeded by Faustin Twagiramungu
