= Agathe Uwilingiyimana =

Prime Minister of Rwanda from 1993 to 1994

4th Prime Minister of Rwanda
- In office 18 July 1993 – 7 April 1994
- President: Juvénal Habyarimana
- Preceded by: Dismas Nsengiyaremye
- Succeeded by: Jean Kambanda

Personal details
- Born: 23 May 1953 Nyaruhengeri, Butare, Ruanda-Urundi
- Died: 7 April 1994 (aged 40) Kigali, Rwanda
- Cause of death: Assassination
- Resting place: Rwanda National Heroes Cemetery
- Party: Republican Democratic Movement
- Spouse: Ignace Barahira (m. 1976; their deaths 1994)
- Children: 5
- Education: National University of Rwanda
- Religion: Catholicism

Agathe Uwilingiyimana (Kinyarwanda: [u.wǐː.ɾiː.ɲɟi.jí.mɑ̂ː.nɑ]; 23 May 1953 – 7 April 1994), sometimes known as Madame Agathe, was a Rwandan political figure. She served as Prime Minister of Rwanda from 18 July 1993 until her assassination on 7 April 1994 during the opening stages of the Rwandan genocide. She was also Rwanda's acting head of state in the hours leading up to her death.

She was Rwanda's first and so far only female prime minister.

== Early life ==
Agathe Uwilingiyimana was born 23 May 1953 in the village of Nyaruhengeri, Butare Province in southern Rwanda, 140 kilometres (87 mi) southeast of the capital Kigali. She moved with her farming parents to the Belgian Congo to find work, but they moved back to Butare in 1957. She was a member of the Hutu ethnicity that made up the majority of the Rwandan population.

After success in public examinations she was educated at Notre Dame des Cîteaux Secondary School, and obtained the certificate to teach humanities in 1973. She continued with graduate studies in mathematics and chemistry, after which she became a schoolteacher in Butare in 1976. By 1983 she was teaching chemistry at the National University of Rwanda in Butare. She received a B.Sc. in 1985, and taught chemistry for four years in Butare academic schools. She received criticism from traditionalists for promoting mathematics and science study amongst female students.

Uwilingiyimana married a high-school classmate, Ignace Barahira, in 1976; she kept her maiden name, as is customary for Rwandese women. She had the first of her five children the next year.

== Rise to prime minister ==
In 1986 she created a Soriority and Credit Cooperative Society among the staff of the Butare academic school, and her high-profile role in the self-help organization brought her to the attention of the Kigali authorities, who wanted to appoint decision makers from the discontented south of the country. In 1989 she became a director in the Ministry of Commerce.

She joined the Republican Democratic Movement (MDR), an opposition party, in 1992, and that April was appointed Minister of Education by Dismas Nsengiyaremye, the first opposition prime minister under a power-sharing scheme negotiated between President Juvénal Habyarimana and five major opposition parties. As education minister, Uwilingiyamana scrapped the academic ethnic quota system, instead distributing public school spots and awards on the basis of open merit. This came in the midst of the Rwandan Civil War of 1990–94, and earned her the enmity of the Hutu extremists, as the quota system had favoured Hutus.

Uwilingiyimana succeeded Nsengiyaremye as Rwanda's prime minister on July 17, 1993, following a meeting between President Habyarimana and the five parties. The party was divided between moderates and extremists, and she was a moderate. Nsengiyaremye and the MDR convened an extraordinary congress in Kabusunzu on 23–24 July, during which hardliners had her resign from the party, together with the president of MDR, Faustin Twagiramungu.

Uwilingiyimana briefly resigned in view of her lack of support, but a group of prominent personalities, including Twagiramungu and Théoneste Bagosora, made her renounce her resignation. The MDR was thus split into two factions each claiming to be the real MDR. At a meeting in Kigali, Habyarimana addressed her condescendingly as "You, woman!", to which she replied "Don't talk to me like that. I'm not your wife!"

== Arusha Accords ==
The Habyarimana–Uwilingiyimana government had the daunting task of successfully completing the Arusha Accords with the rebel Rwandese Patriotic Front (RPF), the Tutsi-dominated guerilla movement. An agreement between Habyarimana, the five opposition parties (led ostensibly by Uwilingiyimana), and the RPF, was finally reached on 4 August 1993. Under Arusha Accords, Habyarimana's ruling MRND would take the transitional presidency, and the Prime Minister would be Faustin Twagiramungu from the MDR.

== Caretaker prime minister ==
President Habyarimana officially dismissed her as prime minister on 4 August 1993, but she stayed on in a caretaker capacity for eight months, until she was killed in April 1994. This was despite being excoriated by all the Hutu-dominated parties, including her own MDR, and President Habyarimana's ruling party, which held a press conference in January 1994 attacking Uwilingiyimana for being a "political trickster". On November 3, 1993, she publicly warned against retaliatory violence against Tutsis for the assassination of the Hutu Burundian President, Melchior Ndadaye, and said that violence was being used to disrupt the Arusha transition.

The swearing in of the Broad Based Transitional Government (BBTG), was to have taken place on 25 March 1994. At that point, Uwilingiyimana was to have stepped down in favor of Faustin Twagiramungu, having been guaranteed a lower-level ministerial post in the new government. However, the RPF did not appear at the ceremony, postponing the establishment of the new regime. She reached agreement with them that the new government would be sworn in on the following day.

== Death ==
The talks between President Habyarimana, Uwilingiyimana, and the Rwandan Patriotic Front were never concluded, and the president's plane was shot down by surface-to-air missiles at around 8:30 pm on 6 April 1994. From Habyarimana's death until her assassination the following morning (approximately 14 hours), Prime Minister Uwilingiyimana was Rwanda's constitutional head of state and of government.

In an interview with Radio France on the night of President Habyarimana's assassination, Uwilingiyimana said that there would be an immediate investigation. She said her home was under siege, and gave her last recorded words:

There is shooting, people are being terrorized, people are inside their homes lying on the floor. We are suffering the consequences of the death of the head of state, I believe. We, the civilians, are in no way responsible for the death of our head of state.

The U.N. peacekeeping force sent an escort of ten Belgian peacekeepers to her home before 3 am the following morning; they intended to take her to Radio Rwanda, from where she planned to make a dawn broadcast appealing for national calm. Uwilingiyimana's house was further guarded by five Ghanaian U.N. troops, who were stationed outside. Inside the house, the family was protected by the Rwandan presidential guard, but between 6:55 and 7:15 am the presidential guard surrounded the U.N. troops and told them to lay down their arms. Fatally, the blue berets ultimately complied, handing over their weapons just before 9 am.

Seeing the stand-off outside her home, Uwilingiyimana and her family took refuge in the Kigali U.N. volunteer compound around 8 am. Eyewitnesses to the inquiry on U.N. actions say that Rwandan soldiers entered the compound at 10 am and searched it for Uwilingiyimana. Fearing for the lives of her children, Uwilingiyimana and her husband emerged. The presidential guard killed them both on the morning of 7 April 1994; Uwilingiyimana had been shot point-blank. Her children escaped and eventually took refuge in Switzerland. In his book Me Against My Brother, Scott Peterson writes that the U.N. troops sent to protect Uwilingiyimana were castrated, gagged with their own genitalia, and then murdered. However, page 44 and 45 of the UNKIBAT-01 Tab 241 of the Prosecution Case File of the International Criminal Tribunal for Rwanda, states: "Although the bodies show signs of fighting, some have rifle-butt or bayonet injuries, some show signs of having been struck by machetes or bullet wounds, there are no traces of sadistic mutilations."

In his book Shake Hands with the Devil, U.N. commander Roméo Dallaire writes that Uwilingiyimana and her husband surrendered themselves to save their children, who stayed hidden in the adjoining housing compound for employees of the United Nations Development Programme. The children survived and were picked up by Captain Mbaye Diagne, a UNAMIR military observer, who smuggled them into the Hôtel des Mille Collines. They were eventually resettled in Switzerland.

Major Bernard Ntuyahaga was indicted by the International Criminal Tribunal for Rwanda (ICTR) for the murder of Uwilingiyimana and the U.N. peacekeepers, but the charges were dropped. He was eventually convicted of murder of the peacekeepers. On 18 December 2008, the ICTR found Colonel Théoneste Bagosora guilty of genocide, crimes against humanity and war crimes and sentenced him to life imprisonment, in part due to his involvement in the murders of Uwilingiyimana and the Belgian peacekeepers.

== Legacy ==
Uwilingiyimana is remembered as a pioneer in women's rights and education in Rwanda, and her efforts to reconcile ethnic differences in the country. Though short, her political career was precedent-setting as one of the few female political figures in Africa. She was contemporaneous with Sylvie Kinigi, Prime Minister of Burundi. As a memorial to the late Rwandan Prime Minister, the Forum for African Women Educationalists (FAWE) established The Agathe Innovative Award Competition. The award funds educational and income generating projects aimed at improving the prospects of African girls. One of FAWE's founding members was Agathe Uwilingiyimana.

Uwilingiyimana was succeeded as prime minister of the interim government by Jean Kambanda, a Hutu hardliner.

Political offices
Preceded by Dismas Nsengiyaremye	Prime Minister of Rwanda; 1993–1994	Succeeded by Jean Kambanda
