= Faustin Twagiramungu =

Rwandan politician (1945–2023)

Faustin Twagiramungu Rukokoma
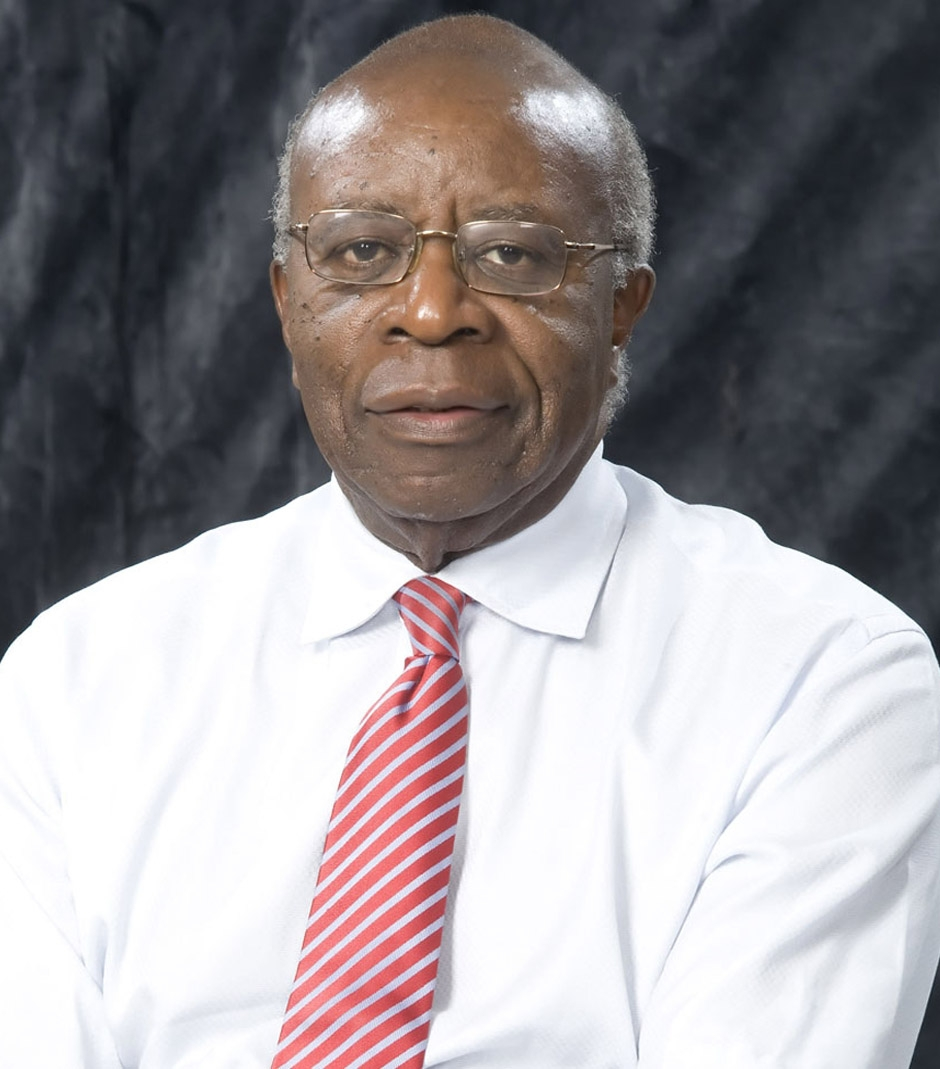
- Twagiramungu in 2013

6th Prime Minister of Rwanda
- In office 19 July 1994 – 28 August 1995
- President: Pasteur Bizimungu
- Preceded by: Jean Kambanda
- Succeeded by: Pierre-Célestin Rwigema

Personal details
- Born: 14 August 1945 Gishoma commune, Cyangugu Prefecture, Ruanda-Urundi
- Died: 2 December 2023 (aged 78) Brussels, Belgium
- Party: Rwandan Dream Initiative (from 2010)
- Other political affiliations: Democratic Forces for Resistance (1996/97–2001); Republican Democratic Movement (1991–2001)
- Spouse: Maria Assumpta Taigga
- Parents: Jean Gishungu (father); Anizi Nyahizumwami (mother)
- Education: McGill University

Faustin Twagiramungu (14 August 1945 – 2 December 2023) was a Rwandan politician. He was Prime Minister of Rwanda from 1994 until his resignation in 1995, the first head of government appointed after the Rwandan Patriotic Front (RPF) captured Kigali. He soon came to disagree with the RPF's policies and actions, resigned and was placed under house arrest, but managed to leave the country and settle in Belgium. He continued his opposition activity against Paul Kagame's rule, subsequently returning to Rwanda and standing for elections, but without success.

== Early life and career ==
Twagiramungu was born in Cyangugu prefecture on 14 August 1945. Although Hutu in origin, Twagiramungu rejected the ethnic label and preferred to see himself as a Rwandan. Twagiramungu spoke Kinyarwanda, French, Swahili and English.

Twagiramungu studied and worked in Quebec, Canada, from 1968 to 1976, during which time he experienced Quebec separatism and met with René Lévesque. After returning to Rwanda, he ran a transportation company called STIR — Société des Transports Internationaux au Rwanda.

== Political career ==
Twagiramungu rose to political prominence after the democratic opening in Rwanda in 1991, as the chairman of a new political party, the Republican Democratic Movement (MDR). MDR joined the multiparty government set up in April 1992, and an MDR politician, Dismas Nsengiyaremye, became the Prime Minister. However, in July 1993, MDR was split between two factions headed by Nsengiyaremye and Twagiramungu, who both wanted to be the Prime Minister in the anticipated Broad-Based Transitional Government (BBTG), a post which was to be decided prior to the signing of the Arusha Accords. Twagiramungu's faction was weak, but he succeeded thanks to support from the other political parties. The Arusha Accords were signed on 4 August 1993, and Twagiramungu was chosen to be the Prime Minister. The BBTG was never installed.

=== Prime Minister after the genocide ===
In July 1994, Twagiramungu finally became Prime Minister in the Arusha-inspired "Government of National Unity" set up by the RPF after taking power in wake of the Rwandan genocide. His appointment was tinged with symbolism for many Rwandans, as he was the son-in-law of Grégoire Kayibanda. After taking office, Twagiramungu was faced with the vexing problem of human rights abuses by the RPF. Like interior minister Seth Sendashonga, he believed there had to be a certain amount of tolerance, but was worried when there seemed to be no end in sight. According to the historian Gérard Prunier who has discussed the issue with Twagiramungu at length, "The Hutu ministers were so conscious of the potential catastrophe their eventual resignations could cause that they swallowed it all in the name of national unity. Until the Kibeho slaughter pushed them over the brink." The tension within the administration came to a head when Twagiramungu called for an "extraordinary council of ministers on security matters" which met on 23 August 1995 and ended two days later when Paul Kagame—the de facto leader of Rwanda and the RPF—made a sardonic comment and left the room. On 28 August, Twagiramungu decided to resign, and four other ministers were fired the next day, including Sendashonga. Twagiramungu was put under house arrest, but managed to leave the country by the end of the year.

=== Opposition in exile ===
In Brussels in March 1996, Twagiramungu and Sendashonga set up an exiled opposition party called the Democratic Forces for Resistance (FRD). FRD was officially launched in April 1997. On 16 May 1998, Sendashonga, who had survived an earlier attempt on his life, was assassinated in Nairobi. Twagiramungu denounced the murder and accused the Rwandan government of culpability. In 2001, a Kenyan court found that the murder was political and blamed the Rwandan government.

In 1998, FRD invited four other exiled movements (RDR, GID, RNLM and UNAR) to form the Union of Rwandan Democratic Forces (UFDR), which wanted to press for a new power-sharing agreement along the lines of the Arusha Accords, and Twagiramungu was slated to be its president from 1998 to 2002. RNLM and UNAR were both old monarchist parties, seen to represent Tutsi interests, but they soon abandoned the alliance. As president of UFDR, Twagiramungu reportedly worked as if he was alone, creating "a party within a party", and was distanced even from the majority of his own party, the FRD. He was also unpopular with the old guard of the RDR "because of his leading role in the Rwandan opposition to Juvénal Habyarimana's government and his position in the moderate section of the MDR." Twagiramungu resigned from the presidency in December 2001 and "essentially detached himself from the opposition movements".

On 10 December 2002, Twagiramungu announced that he would be a candidate in the Rwandan presidential election of 2003. Running on a platform of full employment, regional security, and progressive taxation, he accused the government of attempting to silence his views. He was forced to stand as an independent as his political party, the MDR, was banned. In the final count, he placed second (out of three) with 3.62 percent of the vote. He did not accept the result, claiming that Paul Kagame was leading the country towards a one-party system. The elections were widely condemned as fraudulent by outside observers. Twagiramungu left Rwanda immediately after the election, fearing arrest.

In 2010, Twagiramungu founded a "new political trend" called the Rwandan Dream Initiative (RDI). In early 2014, RDI teamed up with three other parties (PS-Imberakuri, UDR and FDLR) to form the Coalition of Political Parties for Change (CPC). The inclusion of FDLR was a point of controversy. The coalition was reportedly falling apart before the end of the year.

On 4 April 2014, only two days after Kagame had visited Brussels, Twagiramungu was informed by Belgian police and state security that his life was in danger, and his house was provided with police protection for four days. The Globe and Mail reported that "there is mounting evidence that Mr. Kagame's agents are involved in organized efforts to kill exiled dissidents".

Twagiramungu died in Brussels on 2 December 2023, at age 78.

Preceded by Jean Kambanda	Prime Minister of Rwanda; 19 July 1994 – 28 August 1995	Succeeded by Pierre-Célestin Rwigema
