= Pierre-Célestin Rwigema =

Prime Minister of Rwanda from 1995 to 2000

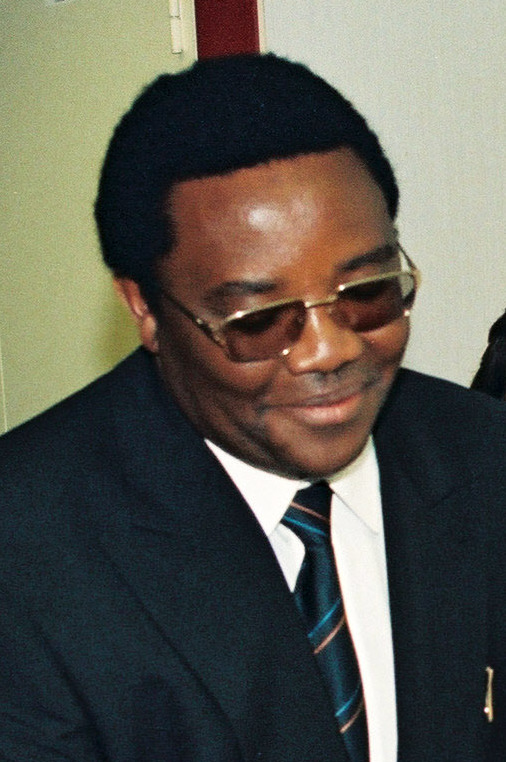
- Rwigema in 1996

Prime Minister of Rwanda
- In office 31 August 1995 – 8 March 2000
- President: Pasteur Bizimungu
- Deputy: Bernard Makuza
- Preceded by: Faustin Twagiramungu
- Succeeded by: Bernard Makuza

Personal details
- Born: 27 July 1953 (age 73) Rwanda
- Party: Independent

Pierre-Célestin Rwigema (born 27 July 1953) is a Rwandan politician previously associated with the moderate faction of the Republican Democratic Movement (MDR) party. He was Prime Minister of Rwanda from 1995 to 2000 and Education Minister from 1994 to 1995. When he was sworn in as prime minister he pledged to reunite his then ethnically torn country.

In 2001, he was accused of alleged involvement in the Rwandan genocide and had an arrest warrant issued for him by the Rwandan government. These charges were brought against him after his resignation as prime minister, when he fled to the United States to seek political asylum. At the time of the accusation, he was studying towards a Master's degree in Business Administration at Bowling Green State University in Ohio, United States. The political climate in Rwanda was volatile at the time. The speaker of the house, Joseph Sebarenzi, resigned and fled. There was allegations of a royalist faction working to undermine the RPF government, and restore the Tutsi monarchy. It has been reported that these charges against him may have been politically motivated.

According to Joseph Sebarenzi, a Tutsi and former speaker of the national assembly from 1997 to 2000, Rwigema was innocent. Sebarenzi wrote in his memoir, God Sleeps in Rwanda: "Regularly I would hear from friends or on the radio that someone else in Rwanda was being targeted. There was Pierre Celestin Rwigema, the prime minister. He was forced to resign. While I was speaker, we had investigated him for mismanagement and embezzlement. The RPF wanted him out and hoped we would censure him. But our investigation could not prove that he had done anything wrong, so we cleared him. I knew that the RPF would not let that stand. So when I heard that Rwigema had resigned, I was not surprised. He eventually fled to the United States. The government of Rwanda told the U.S. government that he was involved in the genocide and asked that he be arrested. But an immigration judge cleared him". He was eventually proven innocent and granted political asylum by the United States immigration court in Detroit.

In October 2011, Rwanda's prosecutor general, Martin Ngoga reported to the media that the judicial process in Rwanda also found no evidence indicting Rwigema in involvement with genocide and therefore his case was suspended. Rwigema returned to Rwanda after 11 years in exile, stating that he was returning freely, and soon held a press conference where he revealed that his primary motivation to return home was to participate in the ongoing development of the country.

In early May 2012, Rwigema was one of 8 candidates elected by the Rwandan parliament among 18 candidates to represent Rwanda in the East African Legislative Assembly (EALA). He vowed to advocate for effective implementation of the EAC common market and customs union protocols, and the fast-tracking of the negotiations on monetary union and the realization of a political federation.

Now he is a lecturer at Kigali Independent University (ULK) at the master's level and also lectures at Jomo Kenyata University at the Ph.D. level.

Preceded by Faustin Twagiramungu	Prime Minister of Rwanda; 1995 – 2000	Succeeded by Bernard Makuza
