= Pasteur Bizimungu =

President of Rwanda from 1994 to 2000

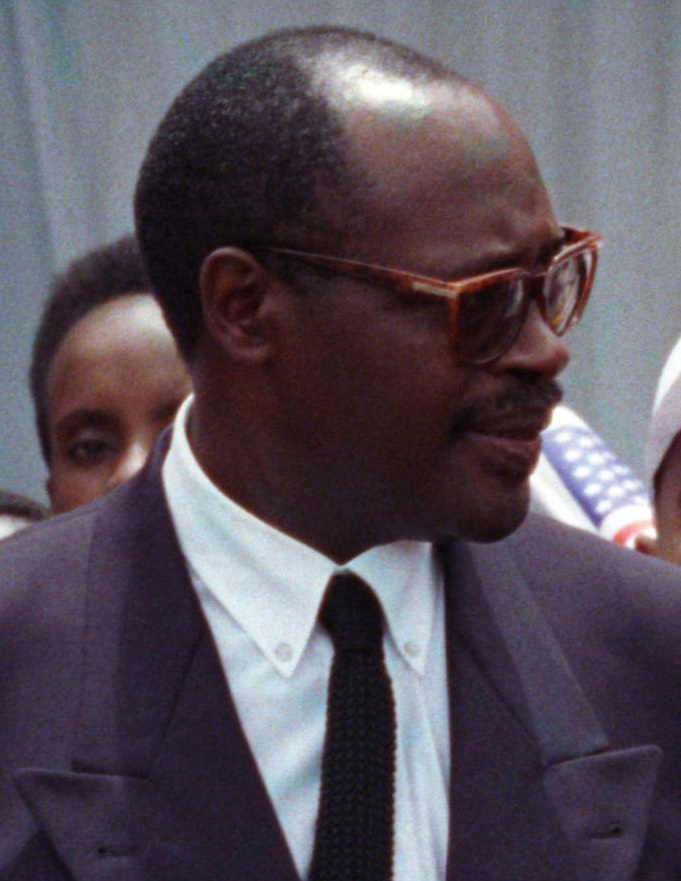
- Bizimungu in 1998

3rd President of Rwanda
- In office 19 July 1994 – 23 March 2000
- Prime Minister: Faustin Twagiramungu; Pierre-Célestin Rwigema; Bernard Makuza
- Vice President: Paul Kagame
- Preceded by: Théodore Sindikubwabo
- Succeeded by: Paul Kagame

Personal details
- Born: 30 April 1950 (age 76) Gisenyi, Rwanda-Urundi
- Party: MRND (1980s–1990); Rwandan Patriotic Front (1990–2000); Party for Democratic Renewal (2001–)
- Spouse: Serafina Bizimungu
- Education: National University of Rwanda; University of Strasbourg

Pasteur Bizimungu (born 30 April 1950) is a Rwandan politician who served as the third President of Rwanda, holding office from 19 July 1994 until 23 March 2000.

Bizimungu had previously held several positions under President Juvenal Habyarimana throughout the 1980s. He joined the Rwandan Patriotic Front (RPF) rebel group against Habyarimana in 1990 following the death of his brother seemingly under the orders of Habyarimana's government. After the RPF's victory in the 1994 Genocide against the Tutsi. Bizimungu became the new president of the country with RPF commander Paul Kagame as vice-president and minister of defense, who was seen as the country's de facto leader throughout his presidency. Bizumungu's presidency was marked by the reconstruction of the country in the wake of the civil war and genocide, as well as the country's support for rebel groups in the First Congo War from 1996 to 1997, and the Second Congo War from 1998 to 2003. Following a series of disputes with Kagame, Bizimungu resigned in 2000, whereupon he was succeeded by Kagame. The following year, Bizimungu founded the Party for Democratic Renewal, which was immediately banned by Kagame's new government. In 2004, Bizimungu was sentenced to fifteen years in prison for attempting to form a militia, inciting violence, and embezzlement, but was pardoned three years later by Kagame.

== Early life ==
A Rwandan, Bizimingu was born in the Gisenyi prefecture of Rwanda. According to the academic Filip Reyntjens, Bizimungu had ties to radical anti-Tutsi groups as a student in the 1970s, but later joined the RPF. He served as President of Rwanda after the 1994 genocide.

== Relationship to MRND ==
In the 1980s and 1990s, Bizimungu worked within the MRND government which ruled Rwanda until 1994. Prior to 1990, Bizimungu had close ties to Hutu president Juvénal Habyarimana. During this period, he held several positions, including director-general of Electrogaz, the national electricity company.

In 1990 he joined the Rwandan Patriotic Front (RPF) after his brother, a colonel in the Rwandan Armed Forces, was murdered. At the time, the RPF was just beginning its invasion of Rwanda from Uganda, which started a war of Liberation for the persecuted Tutsi minority. Bizimungu lived in exile in Belgium, serving as the party's information officer. In 1993, he helped negotiate the 1993 Arusha Accords.

After Habyarimana's assassination in a plane crash on 6 April 1994, ethnic Hutu extremists unleashed the Genocide against the Tutsi..

== Presidency ==
In July 1994 the RPF gained control of the country and established a national unity government. The RPF leader, Paul Kagame, was chosen as vice president, and Bizimungu became president.

During Bizimungu's administration, many believed that he was merely a figurehead, and Kagame held the real power. Bizimungu soon found himself in conflict with Kagame over what Bizimungu argued was unjustified repression of dissent. Critics accused Bizimungu of corruption, alleging that he had blocked Parliament's attempts to censure corrupt ministers, refused to pay compensation to evicted residents on one of his building sites, and dodged Rwandan taxes by registering two of his trucks in the Democratic Republic of Congo.

Bizimungu resigned in March 2000 in a dispute over the make-up of a new cabinet, and Kagame became president.

Weeks before Bizimungu resigned, his adviser, Assiel Kabera, was killed outside his home by men in military uniforms. It has been alleged that Kabera, a genocide survivor, was killed on the orders of Paul Kagame.

== Party for Democratic Renewal ==
In May 2001, Bizimungu founded a new political party, the Party for Democratic Renewal (PDR), known as Ubuyanja in Kinyarwanda. It was almost immediately banned by the government, which accused it of being a radical Hutu party. Bizimungu was arrested, and Amnesty International named him a prisoner of conscience.

He was placed under house arrest for continuing the operations of the party on 19 April 2002 and charged with endangering the state. On 7 June 2004 he was sentenced to 15 years in prison for attempting to form a militia, inciting violence, and embezzlement. He received a five-year sentence for each of these convictions, which were to run consecutively.

On 17 February 2006, Bizimungu's appeal, based on the fact that he was convicted of crimes different from those with which he was initially charged, was denied by the Supreme Court.

He was released on 6 April 2007, having been pardoned by Kagame. Kagame gave no explanation of the pardon. As of April 2011, PDR co-founder and later co-defendant Charles Ntakirutinka remained in prison, and was named an Amnesty International "priority case." However, he was released on 1 March 2012 after serving his full ten-year sentence.

== Family ==
Bizimungu's wife is Séraphine Utamuliza. He has one son, and two daughters, Alexander Tabara, Nicole Tamara, and Carine Cyuzuzo.

Political offices
Preceded by Théodore Sindikubwabo (Interim)	President of Rwanda; 19 July 1994 – 23 March 2000	Succeeded by Paul Kagame
