= List of presidents of Rwanda =

President of the Republic of Rwanda
- Perezida wa Repubulika y’u Rwanda (Kinyarwanda); Rais wa Jamhuri ya Rwanda (Swahili); Président de la République du Rwanda (French)
- Presidential Standard

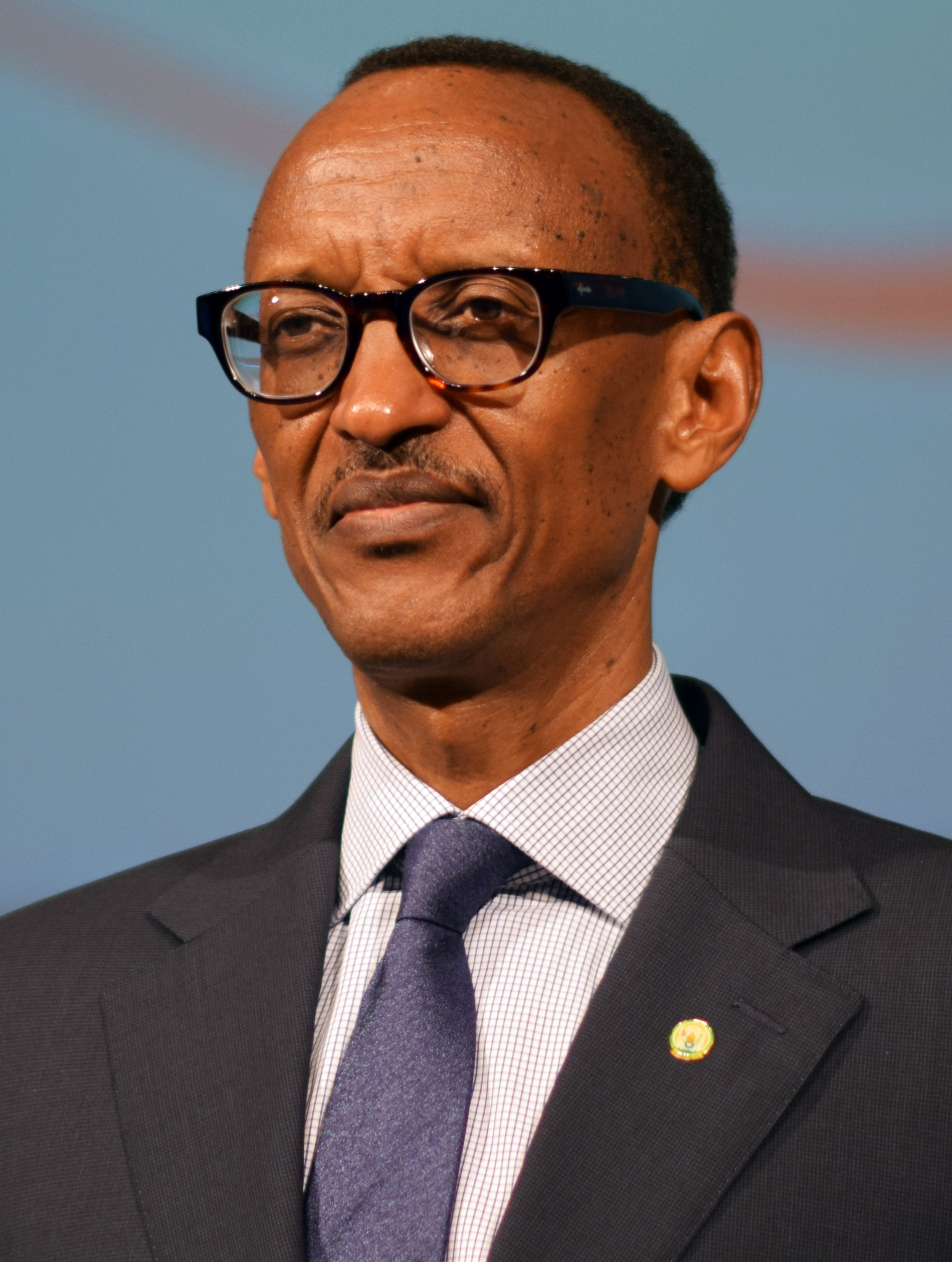
- Incumbent; Paul Kagame since 22 April 2000; Acting: 24 March – 22 April 2000
- Style: Mr President (informal); His Excellency (diplomatic)
- Type: Head of state Executive president
- Residence: Village Urugwiro
- Seat: Kigali
- Appointer: Popular vote
- Term length: Five years, renewable
- Constituting instrument: Constitution of Rwanda (2003)
- Formation: 28 January 1961; 65 years ago
- First holder: Dominique Mbonyumutwa
- Salary: US$85,000 annually
- Website: Official website

This article lists the presidents of Rwanda since the creation of the office in 1961 (during the Rwandan Revolution), to the present day.

The president of Rwanda is the head of state and head of executive of the Republic of Rwanda. The president is elected every seven years by popular vote, and appoints the prime minister and all other members of Cabinet.

A total of four people have served in the office. The incumbent president is Paul Kagame, who took office on 22 April 2000, after being acting president for nearly a month.

== Term limits ==
There was a two-term limit for the president in the Constitution of Rwanda. The constitutional referendum in 2015 allowed Paul Kagame third seven-year term, and ability to run for further two five-year terms thereafter.

== List of officeholders ==
Political parties

Party of the Hutu Emancipation Movement (Parmehutu)
National Republican Movement for Democracy and Development (MRND)
Rwandan Patriotic Front (RPF)

Status

‡ Denotes acting president

List of presidents of Rwanda
| No. | Portrait | Name (Birth–Death) | Elected | Term of office | | | Political party | Prime minister(s) | Ref. |
| No. | Portrait | Name (Birth–Death) | Elected | Took office | Left office | Time in office | Political party | Prime minister(s) | Ref. |
Republic of Rwanda (part of Ruanda-Urundi)
| — | | Dominique Mbonyumutwa‡ (1921–1986) | — | 28 January 1961 | 26 October 1961 | 271 days | Parmehutu | Kayibanda | |
| 1 | Grégoire Kayibanda | Grégoire Kayibanda (1924–1976) | 1961 | 26 October 1961 | 1 July 1962 | 248 days | Parmehutu | Himself | |
Republic of Rwanda (independent country)
| (1) | Grégoire Kayibanda | Grégoire Kayibanda (1924–1976) | 1965; 1969 | 1 July 1962 | 5 July 1973 (Deposed in coup) | 11 years, 4 days | Parmehutu | Position abolished | |
| 2 | Juvénal Habyarimana | Juvénal Habyarimana (1937–1994) (Note: Styled as Chairman of the Committee for Peace and National Unity until 1 August 1973.) | 1978; 1983; 1988 | 5 July 1973 | 6 April 1994 (Assassinated) | 20 years, 275 days | MRND / Military | Position abolished (until 1991) Nsanzimana; Nsengiyaremye; Uwilingiyimana | |
Vacant (6 April 1994 – 8 April 1994)
| — | | Théodore Sindikubwabo‡ (1928–1998) (Note: After the assassination of Habyarimana, Colonel Théoneste Bagosora along with Colonel Rwagafilita gathered supporters and convened a meeting of a Crisis Committee; Sindikubwabo was installed as interim President at the meeting. The committee was officially dissolved, but Bagosora and other senior officers remained de facto leaders of the country during Sindikubwabo's term.) | — | 8 April 1994 | 19 July 1994 (Ousted) (Note: Fled to Zaire at the end of the Rwandan Civil War and the Rwandan genocide.) | 102 days | MRND | Kambanda | |
| 3 | Pasteur Bizimungu | Pasteur Bizimungu (born 1950) | — | 19 July 1994 | 23 March 2000 (Resigned) | 5 years, 248 days | RPF | Twagiramungu; Rwigema; Makuza | |
| 4 | Paul Kagame | Paul Kagame (born 1957) | — | 24 March 2000‡ | 22 April 2000 | 26 years, 217 days | RPF | Makuza; Habumuremyi; Murekezi; Ngirente; Nsengiyumva | |
| 4 | Paul Kagame | Paul Kagame (born 1957) | 2003; 2010; 2017; 2024 | 22 April 2000 | Incumbent | 26 years, 217 days | RPF | Makuza; Habumuremyi; Murekezi; Ngirente; Nsengiyumva | |

== Latest election ==
| Candidate | Party | Votes | % |
|---|---|---|---|
| Paul Kagame | Rwandan Patriotic Front | 8,822,794 | 99.18 |
| Frank Habineza | Democratic Green Party | 44,479 | 0.50 |
| Philippe Mpayimana | Independent | 28,466 | 0.32 |
| Total | | 8,895,739 | 100.00 |
| Valid votes | | 8,895,739 | 99.86 |
| Invalid/blank votes | | 12,137 | 0.14 |
| Total votes | | 8,907,876 | 100.00 |
| Registered voters/turnout | | 9,071,157 | 98.20 |
Source: NEC

== See also ==
- Politics of Rwanda
- List of kings of Rwanda
- Vice President of Rwanda
- Prime Minister of Rwanda
- List of colonial governors of Ruanda-Urundi
  - List of colonial residents of Rwanda
