= Bernard Makuza =

Rwandan politician

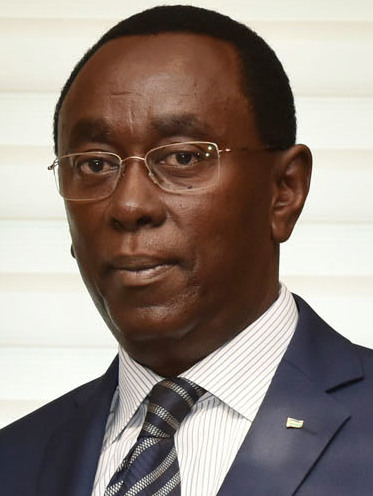

3rd President of the Rwandan Senate
- In office 14 October 2014 – 17 October 2019
- Preceded by: Jean-Damascène Ntawukuriryayo
- Succeeded by: Augustin Iyamuremye

8th prime minister of Rwanda
- In office 8 March 2000 – 7 October 2011
- President: Pasteur Bizimungu; Paul Kagame
- Preceded by: Pierre-Célestin Rwigema
- Succeeded by: Pierre Habumuremyi

Personal details
- Born: 30 September 1962 (age 63) Butare, Rwanda
- Party: Independent

Bernard Makuza (born 30 September 1962) is a Rwandan politician who was Prime Minister of Rwanda from 8 March 2000 to 6 October 2011. He also served as President of the Senate of Rwanda from 14 October 2014 to 17 October 2019.

== Background ==
Makuza's father was Anastase Makuza, who served as a minister during Grégoire Kayibanda's presidency. Like his father, Bernard Makuza attended Saint Léon Minor Seminary of Kabgayi.

== Career ==
Makuza was a member of the Republican Democratic Movement (MDR) before the party was dissolved on 14 April 2003 because of its history of promoting genocide ideology. Makuza resigned his membership in the MDR before being appointed prime minister. In 2006, during his term as prime minister, Makuza identified as belonging to no party.

== Prime minister ==
Makuza was the Rwandan Ambassador to Burundi and then Ambassador to Germany before being appointed as prime minister in March 2000. His appointment to the latter post by President Pasteur Bizimungu followed the resignation of Prime Minister Pierre-Célestin Rwigema, who had been heavily criticized in the Rwandan press and by some parliamentarians.

Makuza remained at the head of a new government named on March 8, 2008, which was composed of 21 ministers and six secretaries of state.

== Senate ==
On 6 October 2011, President Kagame appointed Pierre Habumuremyi to replace Makuza as prime minister. Makuza was instead appointed to the Senate. In the Senate, Makuza served as Vice-President for Legislation and Government Oversight. He was subsequently elected as President of the Senate, with 25 out of 26 votes in favor and no opposing candidate, and sworn in on 14 October 2014.

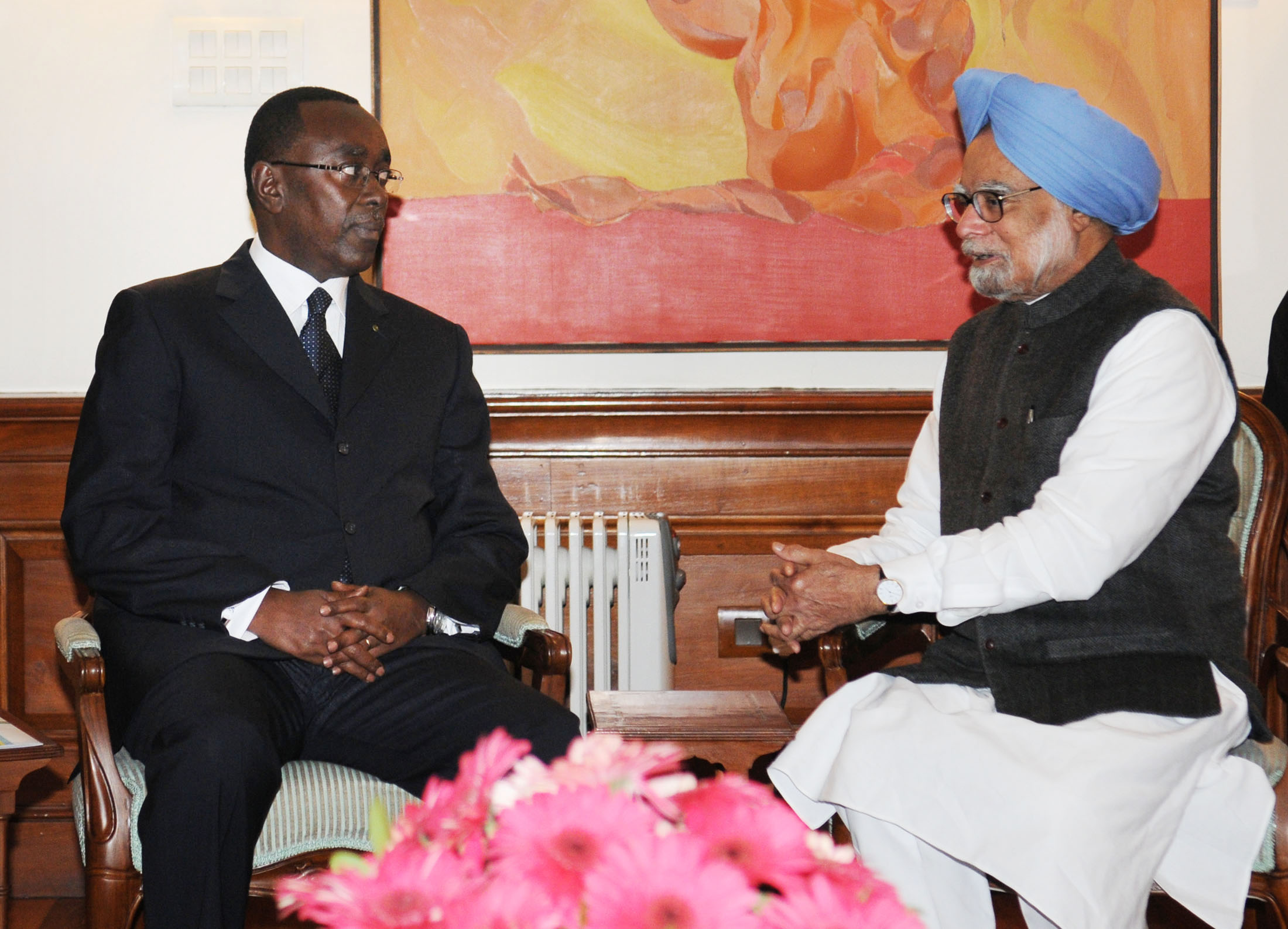
The Prime Minister of Rwanda, Mr. Bernard MAKUZA calling on the Prime Minister, Dr. Manmohan Singh, in New Delhi on January 14, 2011

Political offices
Preceded by Pierre-Célestin Rwigema	Prime Minister of Rwanda; 2000–2011	Succeeded by Pierre Habumuremyi
