= Prime Minister of Rwanda =

Head of government

Prime Minister of the Republic of Rwanda
- Minisitiri w’Intebe wa Repubulika y'u Rwanda (Kinyarwanda); Waziri Mkuu wa Jamhuri ya Rwanda (Swahili); Premier ministre de la République du Rwanda (French)
- Seal of Rwanda

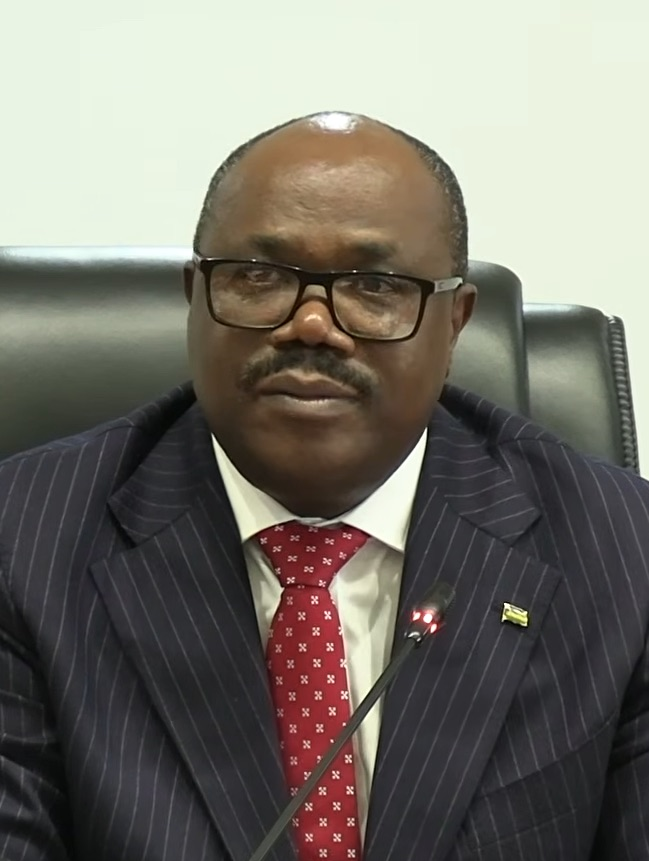
- Incumbent; Justin Nsengiyumva since 25 July 2025
- Style: Mr. Prime Minister (informal); His Excellency (diplomatic); The Right Honourable (honorific prefix)
- Type: Head of government
- Seat: Kigali
- Appointer: President of Rwanda
- Formation: 28 January 1961; 65 years ago
- First holder: Grégoire Kayibanda
- Website: Official website

The prime minister of Rwanda is the head of government of the Republic of Rwanda. The prime minister is appointed by the president, along with other ministers in the Cabinet. A total of 12 people have served in the office. The incumbent prime minister is Justin Nsengiyumva, who took office on 25 July 2025.

== Prime Minister's Office ==
The Prime Minister’s Office is entrusted with assisting the prime minister in the implementation of national policies.

== List of officeholders ==
This lists the prime ministers of Rwanda since the formation of the post in 1961 (during the Rwandan Revolution), to the present day.

Political parties

Party of the Hutu Emancipation Movement (Parmehutu)
National Republican Movement for Democracy and Development (MRND)
Republican Democratic Movement (MDR)
Rwandan Patriotic Front (RPF)
Social Democratic Party (PSD)

Other factions

Independent

No.	Portrait	Name (Birth–Death)	Term of office			Ethnic group	Political party	President(s)
No.	Portrait	Name (Birth–Death)	Took office	Left office	Time in office	Ethnic group	Political party	President(s)
Republic of Rwanda (part of Ruanda-Urundi)
1		Grégoire Kayibanda (1924–1976)	28 January 1961	1 July 1962	1 year, 154 days	Hutu	Parmehutu	Dominique Mbonyumutwa (1961)
1		Grégoire Kayibanda (1924–1976)	28 January 1961	1 July 1962	1 year, 154 days	Hutu	Parmehutu	Himself (1961–1973)
Republic of Rwanda (independent country)
Post abolished (1 July 1962 – 12 October 1991)
2		Sylvestre Nsanzimana (1936–1999)	12 October 1991	2 April 1992	173 days	Hutu	MRND	Juvénal Habyarimana (1973–1994)
3		Dismas Nsengiyaremye (born 1945)	2 April 1992	18 July 1993	1 year, 107 days	Hutu	MDR	Juvénal Habyarimana (1973–1994)
4		Agathe Uwilingiyimana (1953–1994)	18 July 1993	7 April 1994 (assassinated.) (Note: Assassinated during initial events of the Rwandan genocide.)	263 days	Hutu	MDR	Juvénal Habyarimana (1973–1994)
5		Jean Kambanda (born 1955)	9 April 1994	19 July 1994 (ousted.) (Note: Fled to Zaire at the end of the Rwandan Civil War and the Rwandan genocide.)	101 days	Hutu	MDR	Théodore Sindikubwabo (1994)
6		Faustin Twagiramungu (1945–2023)	19 July 1994	31 August 1995	1 year, 43 days	Hutu	MDR	Pasteur Bizimungu (1994–2000)
7		Pierre-Célestin Rwigema (born 1953)	31 August 1995	8 March 2000	4 years, 190 days	Hutu	MDR	Pasteur Bizimungu (1994–2000)
8		Bernard Makuza (born 1961)	8 March 2000	7 October 2011	11 years, 213 days		MDR / Independent	Pasteur Bizimungu (1994–2000)
8		Bernard Makuza (born 1961)	8 March 2000	7 October 2011	11 years, 213 days		MDR / Independent	Paul Kagame (2000–present)
9		Pierre Habumuremyi (born 1961)	7 October 2011	24 July 2014	2 years, 290 days		RPF	Paul Kagame (2000–present)
10		Anastase Murekezi (born 1952)	24 July 2014	30 August 2017	3 years, 37 days		PSD	Paul Kagame (2000–present)
11		Édouard Ngirente (born 1973)	30 August 2017	25 July 2025	7 years, 327 days		PSD	Paul Kagame (2000–present)
12		Justin Nsengiyumva (born 1970/1971)	25 July 2025	Incumbent	1 year, 44 days		PSD	Paul Kagame (2000–present)

== See also ==
- Politics of Rwanda
- List of kings of Rwanda
- List of presidents of Rwanda
- Vice President of Rwanda
- List of colonial governors of Ruanda-Urundi
  - List of colonial residents of Rwanda
