= De facto leader of Rwanda =

Informal political position in Rwanda

- Emblems of arms of Rwanda

- Flags of Rwanda

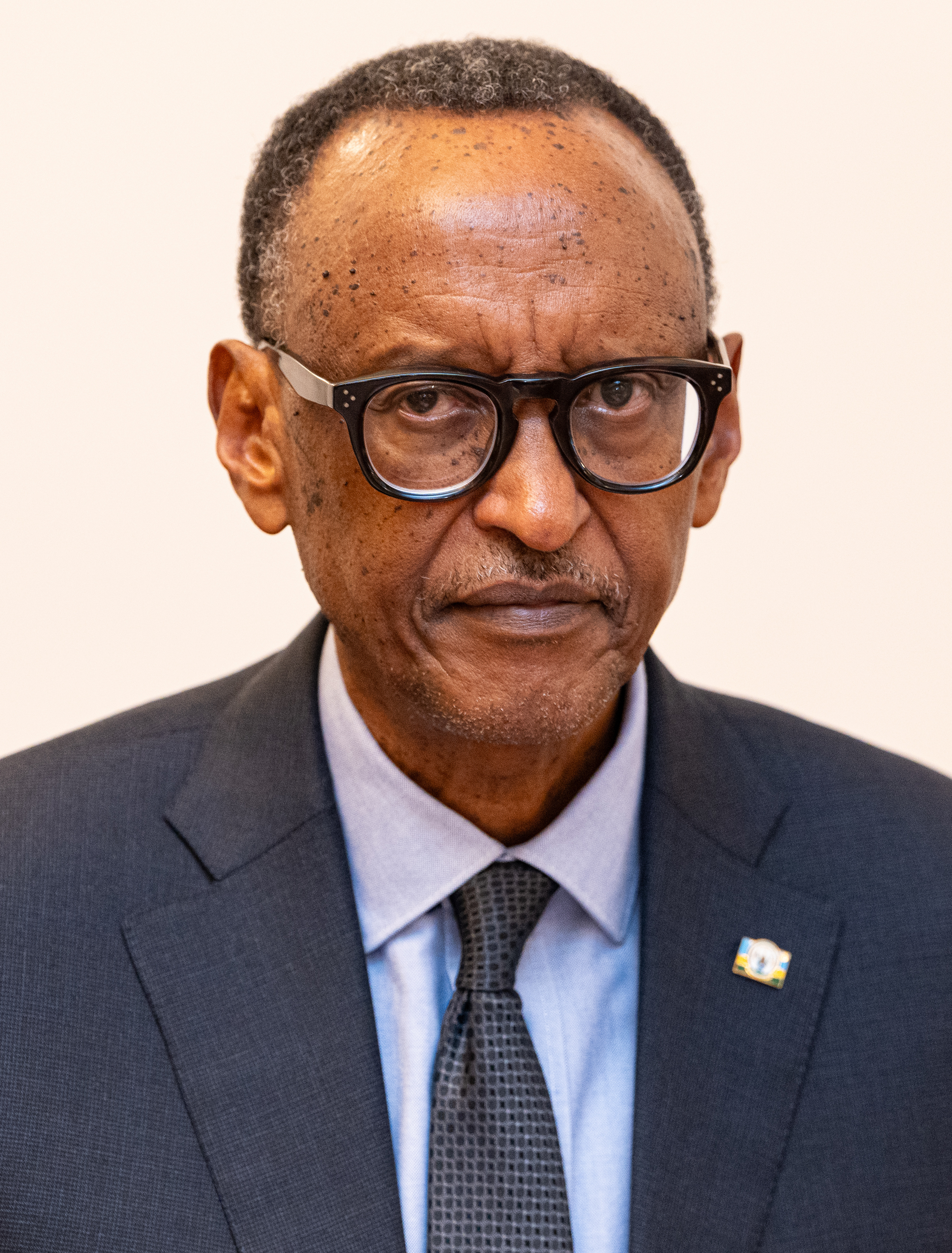
- Incumbent; Paul Kagame since 19 July 1994
- Status: Informal term for the most important political figure of the Republic of Rwanda
- Precursor: Chairman of the Crisis Committee
- Formation: July 19, 1994; 32 years ago
- First holder: Paul Kagame

The de facto leader of the Rwanda is an informal term for the most important political figure in the Republic of Rwanda; the first and current de facto leader is Paul Kagame, who has been the de facto leader since 19 July 1994.

== Background (1994) ==
Rwanda during the Third Republic period already had a de facto leader, who was Théoneste Bagosora; however, his de facto authority was vested in the office of Chairman of the Crisis Committee, the Crisis Committee was a military junta. Bagosora's de facto leadership began after the assassination of the Juvénal Habyarimana, the President of Rwanda on 6 April 1994. During Bagosora's de facto leadership, he began a genocide which killed estimated almost one million people, the genocide ended on 19 July 1994 when he was overthrown by the Rwandan Patriotic Front.

== De facto rule of Paul Kagame (1994–present) ==
With the ending of the civil war and the genocide, Pasteur Bizimungu became the President, which is the de jure executive of the country. While Bizimungu was the de jure leader of the state, real power was in the hands of Rwandan Patriotic Front leader Paul Kagame. During Bizimungu's presidency, de facto leader Kagame also hold the positions of Vice President and Minister of Defence. On 23 March 2000, Bizimungu resigned from his office as president and Kagame, as vice president, became acting president on 24 March 2000 till 22 April 2000, when he became the normal president of the country. However, despite him assuming the presidency (de jure leadership), Kagame remains the de facto leader of the country.

== See also ==
- Rwanda
  - President of Rwanda
  - Vice President of Rwanda
  - Prime Minister of Rwanda
- Other countries
  - De facto leader of Turkmenistan
  - Chief of the High Command
