= Third Rwandan Republic =

Rwanda under Hutu Power regime

Rwandese Republic République Rwandaise
- 6 April 1994–19 July 1994
- Flag Coat of arms
- Motto: Liberté, Coopération, Progrès (Liberty, Cooperation, Progress)
- Anthem: "Rwanda Rwacu" (English: "Our Rwanda")
- Areas under the control of the Hutu Power regime, in green on April 6, 1994
- Capital: Kigali
- Demonym: Rwandan
- Government: One-party presidential republic under a military junta
- Interim President
  - 1994: Théodore Sindikubwabo
- Prime Minister
  - 1994: Jean Kambanda
- De facto leader of Rwanda
  - 1994: Théoneste Bagosora
- Legislature: None
- History
  - Assassination of Juvénal Habyarimana and Cyprien Ntaryamira: 6 April 1994
  - Rwandan genocide: 7 April 1994
  - Fall of Kigali: 19 July 1994

Area
  - Total: 26,338 km^{2} (10,169 sq mi)
- HDI (1994): 0.192 low
- Currency: Rwandan franc
- ISO 3166 code: RW
Preceded by	Succeeded by
Second Rwandese Republic	Republic of Rwanda
- Today part of: Rwanda

The Third Rwandan Republic, also referred to as the Third Rwandese Republic or the Hutu Power regime, was the government of Rwanda enacting the Rwandan genocide during the Rwandan Civil War. It was led by Théoneste Bagosora, Théodore Sindikubwabo, and Jean Kambanda and espoused the supremacist ideology of Hutu Power. Hutu Power and the Third Rwandan Republic have often been compared to Nazism and the Third Reich due to their shared extreme destructiveness.

The Civil War arose from the long-running dispute between the Hutu and Tutsi groups within the Rwandan population. The Rwandan Revolution, which broke out in 1959, had replaced the Tutsi monarchy with a Hutu-led republic, forcing more than 336,000 Tutsis to seek refuge in neighbouring countries. A group of these refugees in Uganda founded the RPF which, under the leadership of Fred Rwigyema and Paul Kagame, became a battle-ready army by the late 1980s and would become the main military opponent of the third republic.

The war began on 1 October 1990, when the RPF invaded north-eastern Rwanda, advancing 60 km (37 mi) into the country. They suffered a major setback when Rwigyema was killed in action on the second day. The Rwandan Army, assisted by expeditionary troops from France, gained the upper hand and the RPF were largely defeated by the end of October. Kagame, who had been in the United States during the invasion, returned to take command. He withdrew troops to the Virunga Mountains for several months before attacking again. The RPF began an insurgency, which continued until mid-1992 with neither side able to gain the upper hand. A series of protests forced Rwandan President Juvénal Habyarimana to begin peace negotiations with the RPF and domestic opposition parties. Despite disruption and killings by Hutu Power, a group of extremists opposed to any deal, and a fresh RPF offensive in early 1993, the negotiations were successfully concluded with the signing of the Arusha Accords in August 1993.

An uneasy peace followed, during which the terms of the accords were gradually implemented. RPF troops were deployed to a compound in Kigali and the peace-keeping United Nations Assistance Mission for Rwanda (UNAMIR) was sent to the country. The Hutu Power movement was steadily gaining influence and planned a "final solution" to exterminate the Tutsi. This plan was put into action following the assassination of President Habyarimana on 6 April 1994. Over the course of about a hundred days, between 500,000 and 1,000,000 Tutsi and moderate Hutu were killed in the Rwandan genocide. The RPF quickly resumed the civil war. They captured territory steadily, encircling cities and cutting off supply routes. By mid-June they had surrounded the capital, Kigali, and on 4 July they seized it. The war ended later that month when the RPF captured the last territory held by the interim government, forcing the government and genocidaires into Zaire. The victorious RPF assumed control of the country, with Paul Kagame as de facto leader, ending the third republic. As of 2026, Kagame and the RPF remain the dominant political force in Rwanda.

== Background ==
=== Pre-independence Rwanda and origins of Hutu, Tutsi, and Twa ===
The earliest inhabitants of what is now Rwanda were the Twa, Indigenous pygmy hunter-gatherers who settled in the area between 8000 BC and 3000 BC and remain in Rwanda today. Between 700 BC and 1500 AD, Bantu groups migrated into the region and began to clear forest land for agriculture. The forest-dwelling Twa lost much of their land and moved to the slopes of mountains. Historians have several theories regarding the Bantu migrations. One theory is that the first settlers were Hutu, and the Tutsi migrated later and formed a distinct racial group, possibly originating from the Horn of Africa. An alternative theory is that the migration was slow and steady, with incoming groups integrating into rather than conquering the existing society. Under this theory, the Hutu and Tutsi are a later class, rather than racial, distinction.

The population coalesced, first into clans (ubwoko) and into around eight kingdoms by 1700. The Kingdom of Rwanda, ruled by the Tutsi Nyiginya clan, became dominant from the mid-eighteenth century, expanding through conquest and assimilation. It achieved its greatest extent under the reign of Kigeli Rwabugiri in 1853–1895. Rwabugiri expanded the kingdom west and north, and initiated administrative reforms which caused a rift to grow between the Hutu and Tutsi populations. These included uburetwa, a system of forced labour which Hutu had to perform to regain access to land seized from them, and ubuhake, under which Tutsi patrons ceded cattle to Hutu or Tutsi clients in exchange for economic and personal service. Rwanda and neighbouring Burundi were assigned to Germany by the Berlin Conference of 1884, and Germany established a presence in 1897 with the formation of an alliance with the King. German policy was to rule through the Rwandan monarchy, enabling colonisation with fewer European troops. The colonists favoured the Tutsi over the Hutu when assigning administrative roles, believing them to be migrants from Ethiopia and racially superior. The Rwandan King welcomed the Germans, and used their military strength to reinforce his rule and expand the kingdom. In World War I, Belgian forces took control of Rwanda and Burundi during the Tabora and Mahenge offensives, and from 1926 began a policy of more direct colonial rule. The Belgian administration, in conjunction with Catholic clerics, modernised the local economy. They also increased taxes and imposed forced labour on the population. Tutsi supremacy remained, reinforced by Belgian support of two monarchies, leaving the Hutu disenfranchised. In 1935, Belgium introduced identity cards classifying each individual as Tutsi, Hutu, Twa, or Naturalised. It had previously been possible for wealthy Hutu to become honorary Tutsi, but the identity cards prevented further movement between the groups.

=== Revolution, exile of Tutsi, and the Hutu republic ===
After 1945, a Hutu counter-elite developed, demanding the transfer of power from Tutsi to Hutu. The Tutsi leadership responded by trying to negotiate a speedy independence on their terms but found that the Belgians no longer supported them. There was a simultaneous shift in the Catholic Church, with prominent conservative figures in the early Rwandan church replaced by younger clergy of working-class origin. Of these, a greater proportion were Flemish rather than Walloon Belgians and sympathised with the plight of the Hutu. In November 1959, the Hutu began a series of riots and arson attacks on Tutsi homes, following false rumours of the death of a Hutu sub-chief in an assault by Tutsi activists. Violence quickly spread across the whole country, beginning the Rwandan Revolution. The King and Tutsi politicians launched a counter-attack in an attempt to seize power and ostracise the Hutu and Belgians, but were thwarted by Belgian Colonel Guy Logiest, who was brought in by the colonial governor. Logiest re-established law and order and began a programme of overt promotion and protection of the Hutu elite. He replaced many Tutsi chiefs with Hutu and effectively forced King Kigeli V into exile.

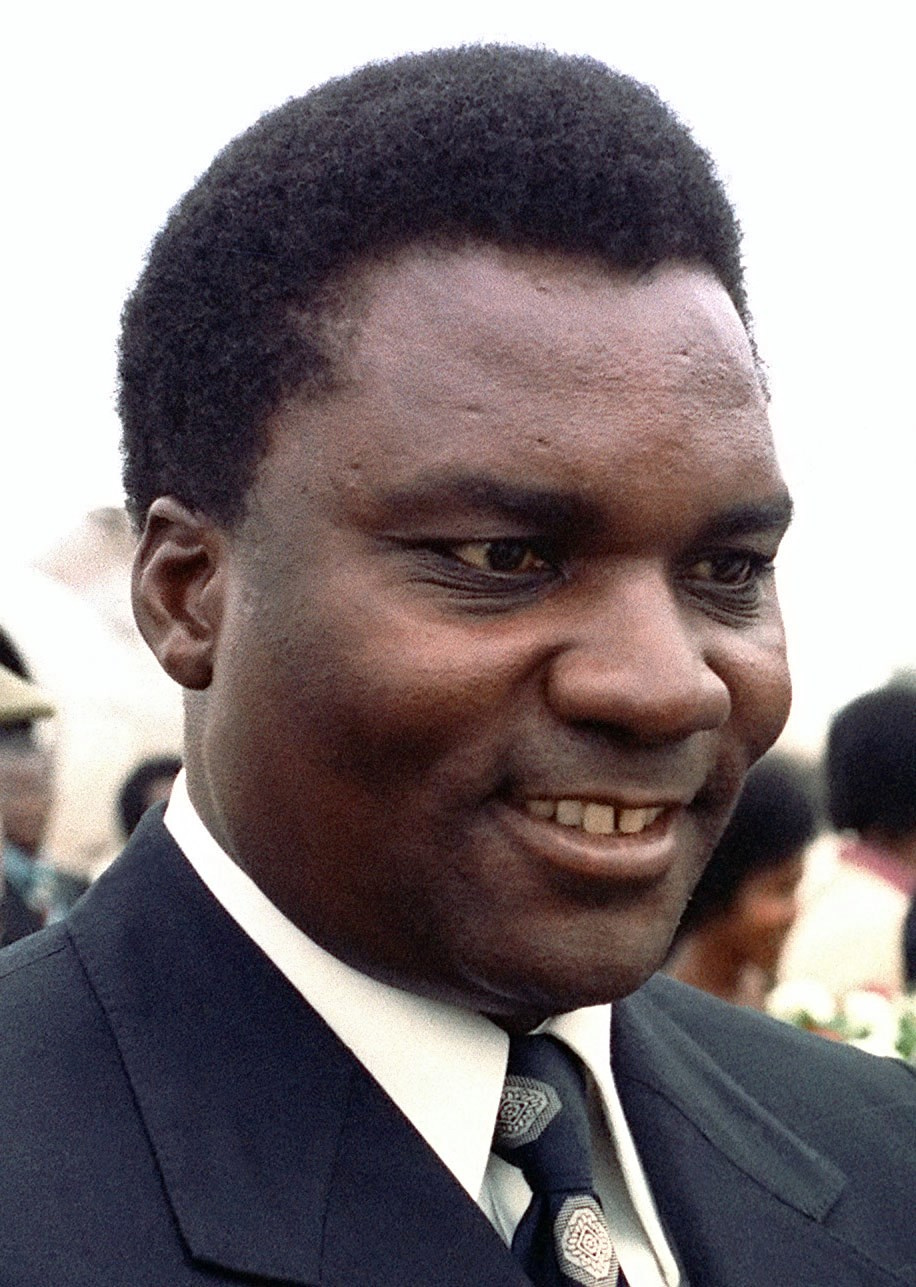
Hutu army officer Juvénal Habyarimana (pictured) became President of Rwanda after a 1973 coup. His assassination marked the beginning of the Rwandan Genocide.

Logiest and Hutu leader Grégoire Kayibanda declared the country an autonomous republic in 1961 and it became independent in 1962. More than 336,000 Tutsi left Rwanda by 1964 to escape the Hutu purges, mostly to the neighbouring countries of Burundi, Uganda, Tanzania and Zaire. Many of the Tutsi exiles lived as refugees in their host countries, and sought to return to Rwanda. Some supported the new Rwandan Government, but others formed armed groups and launched attacks on Rwanda, the largest of which advanced close to Kigali in 1963. These groups were known in Kinyarwanda as the inyenzi (cockroaches). Historians do not know the origin of this term—it is possible the rebels coined it themselves, the name reflecting that they generally attacked at night. The inyenzi label resurfaced in the 1990s as a highly derogatory term for the Tutsi, used by Hutu hardliners to dehumanise them. The inyenzi attacks of the 1960s were poorly equipped and organised and the government defeated them. The last significant attack was made in desperation from Burundi in December 1963 but failed due to bad planning and lack of equipment. The government responded to this attack with the slaughter of an estimated 10,000 Tutsi within Rwanda.

Kayibanda presided over a Hutu republic for the next decade, imposing an autocratic rule similar to the pre-revolution feudal monarchy. In 1973 Hutu army officer Juvénal Habyarimana toppled Kayibanda in a coup. He founded the National Republican Movement for Democracy and Development (MRND) party in 1975, and promulgated a new constitution following a 1978 referendum, making the country a one-party state in which every citizen had to belong to the MRND. Anti-Tutsi discrimination continued under Habyarimana but the country enjoyed greater economic prosperity and reduced anti-Tutsi violence. A coffee price collapse in the late 1980s caused a loss of income for Rwanda's wealthy elite, precipitating a political fight for power and access to foreign aid receipts. The family of first lady Agathe Habyarimana, known as the akazu, were the principal winners in this fight. The family had a more respected lineage than that of the president, having ruled one of the independent states near Gisenyi in the nineteenth century. Habyarimana therefore relied on them in controlling the population of the north-west. The akazu exploited this to their advantage, and Habyarimana was increasingly unable to rule without them. The economic situation forced Habyarimana to greatly reduce the national budget, which led to civil unrest. On the advice of French president François Mitterrand, Habyarimana declared a commitment to multi-party politics but took no action to bring this about. Student protests followed and by late 1990 the country was in crisis.

=== Formation of the RPF and preparation for war ===
The organisation which became the Rwandan Patriotic Front (RPF) was founded in 1979 in Uganda. It was initially known as the Rwandan Refugees Welfare Association and then from 1980 as the Rwandan Alliance for National Unity (RANU). It formed in response to persecution and discrimination against the Tutsi refugees by the regime of Ugandan President Milton Obote. Obote accused the Rwandans of collaboration with his predecessor, Idi Amin, including occupying the homes and stealing the cattle of Ugandans who had fled from Amin. Meanwhile, Tutsi refugees Fred Rwigyema and Paul Kagame had joined Yoweri Museveni's rebel Front for National Salvation (FRONASA). Museveni fought alongside Obote to defeat Amin in 1979 but withdrew from the government following Obote's disputed victory in the 1980 general election. With Rwigyema and Kagame he formed a new rebel army, the National Resistance Army (NRA). The NRA's goal was to overthrow Obote's government, in what became known as the Ugandan Bush War. President Obote remained hostile to the Rwandan refugees throughout his presidency and RANU was forced into exile in 1981, relocating to Nairobi in Kenya. In 1982, with the authority of Obote, local district councils in the Ankole region issued notices requiring refugees to be evicted from their homes and settled in camps. These evictions were violently implemented by Ankole youth militia. Many displaced Rwandans attempted to cross the border to Rwanda, but the Habyarimana regime confined them to isolated camps and closed the border to prevent further migration. Faced with the threat of statelessness, many more Tutsi refugees in Uganda chose to join Museveni's NRA.

In 1986, the NRA captured Kampala with a force of 14,000 soldiers, including 500 Rwandans, and formed a new government. After Museveni was inaugurated as president he appointed Kagame and Rwigyema as senior officers in the new Ugandan army. The experience of the Bush War inspired Rwigyema and Kagame to consider an attack against Rwanda, with the goal of allowing the refugees to return home. As well as fulfilling their army duties, the pair began building a covert network of Rwandan Tutsi refugees within the army's ranks, intended as the nucleus for such an attack. With the pro-refugee Museveni in power, RANU was able to move back to Kampala. At its 1987 convention it renamed itself to the Rwandan Patriotic Front and it too committed to returning the refugees to Rwanda by any means possible. In 1988, a leadership crisis within the RPF prompted Fred Rwigyema to intervene in the organisation and take control, replacing Peter Bayingana as RPF president. Kagame and other senior members of Rwigyema's Rwandan entourage within the NRA also joined, Kagame assuming the vice presidency. Bayingana remained as the other vice president but resented the loss of the leadership. Bayingana and his supporters attempted to start the war with an invasion in late 1989 without the support of Rwigyema, but this was quickly repelled by the Rwandan Army.

Rwandan President Habyarimana was aware of the increasing number of Tutsi exiles in the Ugandan Army and made representations to President Museveni on the matter. At the same time many native Ugandans and Baganda officers in the NRA began criticising Museveni over his appointment of Rwandan refugees to senior positions. He therefore demoted Kagame and Rwigyema in 1989. They remained de facto senior officers but the change in official status, and the possibility that they might lose access to the resources of the Ugandan military, caused them to accelerate their plans to invade Rwanda. In 1990 a dispute in south-western Uganda between Ugandan ranch owners and squatters on their land, many of whom were Rwandans, led to a wider debate on indigeneity and eventually to the explicit labeling of all Rwandan refugees as non-citizens. Realising the precariousness of their own positions, the opportunity afforded by both the renewed drive of refugees to leave Uganda, and the instability on the Rwandan domestic scene, Rwigyema and Kagame decided in mid-1990 to effect their invasion plans immediately. It is likely President Museveni knew of the planned invasion but did not explicitly support it. In mid-1990 Museveni ordered Rwigyema to attend an officer training course at the Command and General Staff College in Fort Leavenworth in the United States, and was also planning overseas deployments for other senior Rwandans in the army. This may have been a tactic to reduce the threat of an RPF invasion of Rwanda. After two days of discussion Rwigyema persuaded Museveni that following years of army duty he needed a break and was allowed to remain in Uganda. Museveni then ordered Kagame to attend instead. The RPF leadership allowed him to go, to avoid suspicion, even though it meant his missing the beginning of the war.

== Establishment ==
Many exiled refugee Rwandan Tutsis in Uganda had joined the rebel forces of Yoweri Kaguta Museveni in the Ugandan Bush War and had then become part of the Ugandan military upon the rebel victory in 1986. Among these were Fred Rwigyema and Paul Kagame, who rose to prominence in the Rwandan Patriotic Front (RPF), a Rwandan rebel group largely consisting of Tutsi veterans of the Ugandan war. On October 1, 1990, the RPF invaded Rwanda from their base in neighboring Uganda. The rebel force, composed primarily of ethnic Tutsis, blamed the government for failing to democratize and resolve the problems of some 500,000 Tutsi refugees living in diaspora around the world.

The Tutsi diaspora miscalculated the reaction of its invasion of Rwanda. Though the Tutsi objective seemed to be to pressure the Rwandan government into making concessions, the invasion was seen as an attempt to bring the Tutsi ethnic group back into power. The effect was to increase ethnic tensions to a level higher than they had ever been. Nevertheless, after 3 years of fighting and multiple prior "cease-fires," the government and the RPF signed a "final" cease-fire agreement in August 1993, known as the Arusha Accords, in order to form a power sharing government, a plan which immediately ran into problems.

The situation worsened when the first elected Burundian president, Melchior Ndadaye, a Hutu, was assassinated by the Burundian Tutsi-dominated army in October 1993. In Burundi, a fierce civil war then erupted between Tutsi and Hutu following the army's massacre. This conflict spilled over the border into Rwanda and destabilized the fragile Rwandan accords. Tutsi-Hutu tensions rapidly intensified. Although the UN sent a peacekeeping force named the United Nations Assistance Mission for Rwanda (UNAMIR), it was underfunded, under-staffed, and largely ineffective in the face of a two country civil-war. The UN denied Lieutenant-General Roméo Dallaire's request for additional troops and changes to the rules of engagement to prevent the coming genocide.

== Rwandan Genocide ==
The Rwandan Genocide occurred from 7 April to 19 July 1994 during the Rwandan Civil War. Over a span of around 100 days, members of the Tutsi ethnic group, as well as some moderate Hutu and Twa, were systematically killed by Hutu militias. While the Rwandan Constitution states that over 1 million people were killed, most scholarly estimates suggest between 500,000 and 662,000 Tutsi died. The genocide was marked by extreme violence, with victims often murdered by neighbours, and widespread sexual violence, with between 250,000 and 500,000 cases of rape.

The genocide was rooted in long-standing ethnic tensions, most recently from the Rwandan Hutu Revolution from 1959 to 1962, which resulted in Rwandan Tutsi fleeing to Uganda due to the ethnic violence that had occurred. Hostilities were then exacerbated further due to the Rwandan Civil War, which began in 1990 when the Rwandan Patriotic Front (RPF), a predominantly Tutsi rebel group, invaded Rwanda from Uganda. The war reached a tentative peace with the Arusha Accords in 1993. However, the assassination of President Juvénal Habyarimana on 6 April 1994 ignited the genocide, as Hutu extremists used the power vacuum to target Tutsi and moderate Hutu leaders.

Immediately following the assassinations of Habyarimana on 6 April 1994 and Prime Minister Agathe Uwilingiyimana on 7 April, Sindikubwabo was installed as interim president by the Crisis Committee controlled by Colonel Théoneste Bagosora, and he was the head of state during the genocide. On 19 April 1994, Sindikubwabo made a now-infamous speech at the ceremony appointing a new Préfet (Governor) of Butare that was broadcast on national radio, in which he insulted those who were not "working", a euphemism for killing Tutsis, and told them to "get out of the way and let us work". On 29 April, he returned to Butare and told the populace that he was there to supervise the killing of Tutsis. On 18 May, whilst on a visit to Kibuye Prefecture, he congratulated the people on how well they had done their "work".

Taking advantage of his medical knowledge, he advised the military to cut a certain vein on the jugular to cause certain death.

Despite the scale of the atrocities, the international community failed to intervene to stop the killings. The RPF resumed military operations in response to the genocide, eventually defeating the government forces and ending the genocide by capturing all government-controlled territory. Sindikubwabo fled to Zaire (now the Democratic Republic of the Congo), part of the flight of the génocidaires and many Hutu refugees into Zaire (now the Democratic Republic of the Congo), contributing to regional instability and triggering the First Congo War in 1996.

The legacy of the genocide remains significant in Rwanda. The country has instituted public holidays to commemorate the event and passed laws criminalizing "genocide ideology" and "divisionism".

=== Planning and organization ===
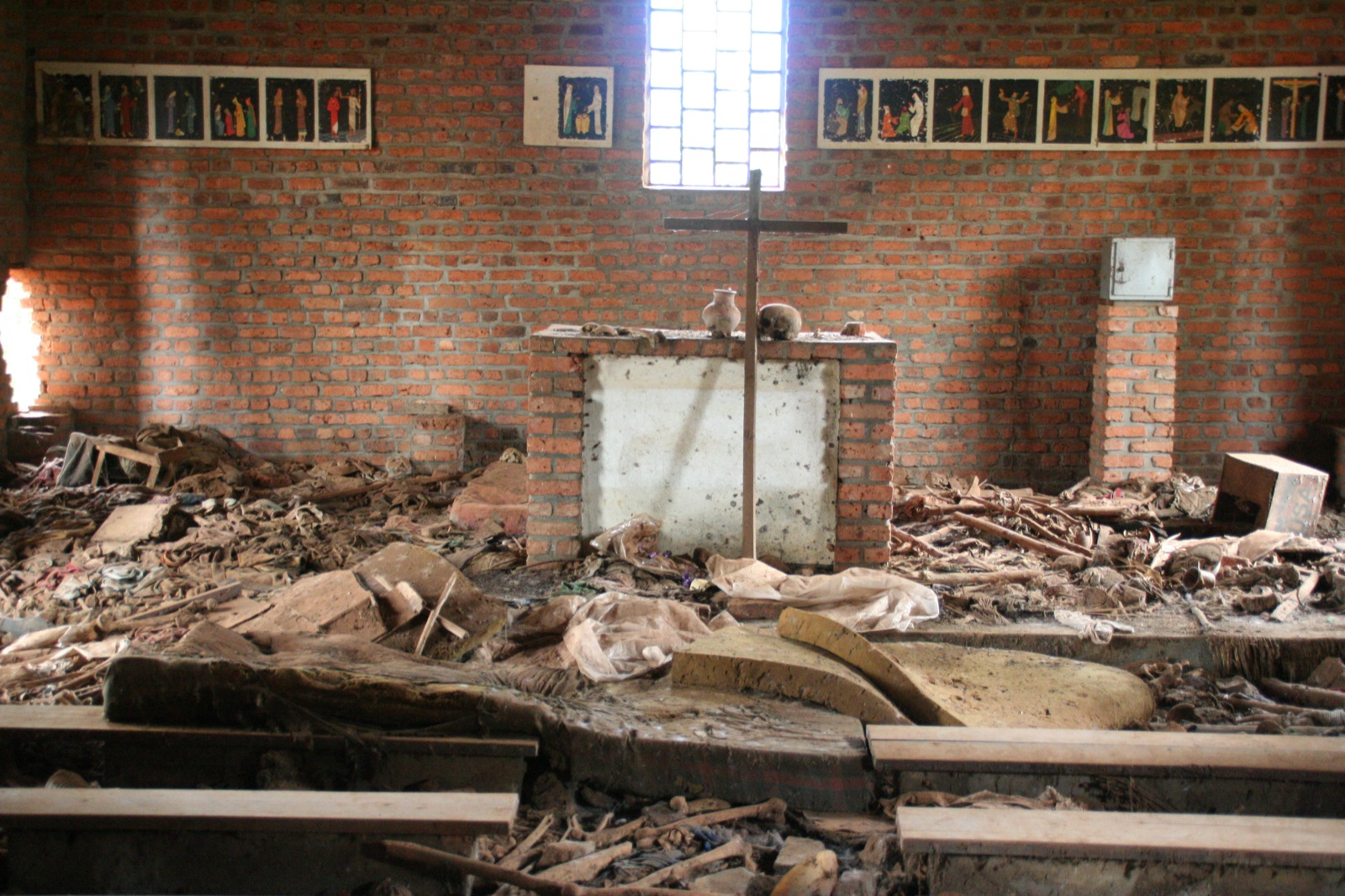
Over 5,000 people seeking refuge in Ntarama church were killed by grenade, machete, rifle, or burnt alive.

Rwanda was divided into 11 prefectures and 145 communes in 1994.

The large-scale killing of Tutsi began within a few hours of Habyarimana's death. The crisis committee, headed by Théoneste Bagosora, took power in the country following Habyarimana's death, and was the principal authority coordinating the genocide. Following the assassination of Habyarimana, Bagosora immediately began issuing orders to kill Tutsi, addressing groups of interahamwe in person in Kigali, and making telephone calls to leaders in the prefectures. Other leading organisers on a national level were defence minister Augustin Bizimana; commander of the paratroopers Aloys Ntabakuze; and the head of the Presidential Guard, Protais Mpiranya. Businessman Félicien Kabuga funded the RTLM and the Interahamwe, while Pascal Musabe and Joseph Nzirorera were responsible for coordinating the Interahamwe and Impuzamugambi militia activities nationally.

Military leaders in Gisenyi prefecture, the heartland of the akazu, were initially the most organized, convening a gathering of the interahamwe and civilian Hutus. The commanders announced the president's death (for which they blamed the RPF), and ordered the crowd to "begin your work" and to "spare no one", including infants. The killing spread to Ruhengeri, Kibuye, Kigali, Kibungo, Gikongoro and Cyangugu prefectures on 7 April; in each case, local officials, responding to orders from Kigali, spread rumours that the RPF had killed the president, followed by a command to kill Tutsi. The Hutu population, which had been prepared and armed during the preceding months, and maintained the Rwandan tradition of obedience to authority, carried out the orders without question. On the other hand, there are views that the genocide was not sudden, irresistible or uniformly orchestrated, but "a cascade of tipping points, and each tipping point was the outcome of local, intra-ethnic contests for dominance (among Hutu)", and that the protracted struggles for supremacy in local communes meant that a more determined stance from the international community would likely have prevented the worst from happening.

In Kigali, the genocide was led by the Presidential Guard, the elite unit of the army. They were assisted by the Interahamwe and Impuzamugambi, who set up roadblocks throughout the capital. Each person passing the roadblock was required to show the national identity card, which included ethnicity, and any with Tutsi cards were killed immediately. The militias also searched houses in the city, killing Tutsi and looting their property. Tharcisse Renzaho, the prefect of Kigali-ville, played a leading role, touring the roadblocks to ensure their effectiveness and using his position at the top of the Kigali provincial government to disseminate orders and dismiss officials who were not sufficiently active in the killings.

In rural areas, the local government hierarchy was also in most cases the chain of command for the execution of the genocide. The prefect of each prefecture, acting on orders from Kigali, disseminated instructions to the commune leaders (bourgmestres), who in turn issued directions to the leaders of the sectors, cells and villages within their communes. The majority of the actual killings in the countryside were carried out by ordinary civilians, under orders from the leaders. Tutsi and Hutu lived side by side in their villages, and families all knew each other, making it easy for Hutu to identify and target their Tutsi neighbours. Gerard Prunier ascribes this mass complicity of the population to a combination of "democratic majority" ideology, in which Hutus had been taught to regard Tutsi as dangerous enemies, a culture of unbending obedience to authority, and duress—villagers refusing to kill were often branded Tutsi sympathisers and murdered.

=== Interim government ===
There were few killings in the prefectures of Gitarama and Butare during the early phase, as the prefects of those areas were moderates opposed to the violence. The genocide began in Gitarama after the interim government relocated to the prefecture on 12 April. Butare was ruled by the only Tutsi prefect in the country, Jean-Baptiste Habyalimana. Habyalimana refused to authorise any killings in his territory, and for a while Butare became a sanctuary for Tutsi refugees from elsewhere in the country. This lasted until 18 April, when the interim government dismissed him from his post and replaced him with government loyalist Sylvain Nsabimana.

The crisis committee appointed an interim government on 8 April; using the terms of the 1991 constitution instead of the Arusha Accords, the committee designated Théodore Sindikubwabo as interim president of Rwanda, while Jean Kambanda was the new prime minister. All political parties were represented in the government, but most members were from the "Hutu Power" wings of their respective parties. The interim government was sworn in on 9 April, but relocated from Kigali to Gitarama on 12 April, ostensibly fleeing RPF's advance on the capital. The crisis committee was officially dissolved, but Bagosora and the senior officers remained the de facto rulers of the country. The government played its part in mobilising the population, giving the regime an air of legitimacy, but was effectively a puppet regime with no ability to halt the army or the Interahamwe's activities. When Roméo Dallaire visited the government's headquarters a week after its formation, he found most officials at leisure, describing their activities as "sorting out the seating plan for a meeting that was not about to convene any time soon".

=== Death toll and timeline ===
During the remainder of April and early May, the Presidential Guard, gendarmerie and the youth militia, aided by local populations, continued killing at a very high rate. The goal was to kill every Tutsi living in Rwanda and, with the exception of the advancing rebel RPF army, there was no opposition force to prevent or slow the killings. The domestic opposition had already been eliminated, and UNAMIR were expressly forbidden to use force except in self-defence. In rural areas, where Tutsi and Hutus lived side by side and families knew each other, it was easy for Hutu to identify and target their Tutsi neighbours. In urban areas, where residents were more anonymous, identification was facilitated using roadblocks guarded by military and interahamwe; each person passing the roadblock was required to show the national identity card, which included ethnicity, and any with Tutsi cards were killed immediately. Many Hutus were also killed for a variety of reasons, including sympathy for moderate opposition parties, being a journalist or simply having a "Tutsi appearance". Thousands of bodies were dumped into the Kagera River, which ran along the northern border between Rwanda and Uganda and flowed into Lake Victoria. Consumers refused to buy fish caught in Lake Victoria for fear that they were tainted by decomposing corpses, causing significant damage to the Ugandan fishing industry. The Ugandan government responded by dispatching teams to retrieve the bodies from the Kagera River before they entered the lake. The RPF was making slow but steady gains in the north and east of the country, ending the killings in each area occupied. The genocide was effectively ended during April in areas of Ruhengeri, Byumba, Kibungo and Kigali prefectures. The killings ceased during April in the akazu heartlands of western Ruhengeri and Gisenyi, as almost every Tutsi had been eliminated. Fearing retribution, many Hutus fled RPF-conquered areas. 500,000 Kibungo residents walked over the bridge at Rusumo Falls into Tanzania in a few days at the end of April, and were accommodated in United Nations camps effectively controlled by ousted leaders of the Hutu regime, with the former prefect of Kibungo prefecture in overall control.

In the remaining prefectures, killings grew increasingly sporadic throughout May and June; most Tutsi were already dead, and the interim government wished to rein in the growing anarchy and engage the population in fighting the RPF. On 23 June, around 2,500 soldiers entered southwestern Rwanda as part of the French-led United Nations Opération Turquoise. This was intended as a humanitarian mission, but the soldiers were not able to save significant numbers of lives. The genocidal authorities were overtly welcoming of the French, displaying the French flag on their own vehicles, but killing Tutsi who came out of hiding seeking protection. In July, the RPF completed their conquest of the country, with the exception of the zone occupied by Operation Turquoise. The RPF took Kigali on 4 July, and Gisenyi and the rest of the northwest on 18 July. The genocide ended the following day, but as had occurred in Kibungo, the Hutu population fled en masse across the border, this time into Zaire, with Bagosora and the other leaders accompanying them.

Impact of the genocide on average life expectancy

The succeeding RPF government claims that 1,074,017 people were killed in the genocide, 94% of whom were Tutsi. In contrast, Human Rights Watch, following on-the-ground research, estimated the casualties at 507,000 people. According to a 2020 symposium of the Journal of Genocide Research, the official figure is not credible as it overestimates the number of Tutsi in Rwanda prior to the genocide. Using different methodologies, the scholars in the symposium estimated 500,000 to 600,000 deaths—around two-thirds of the Tutsi population in Rwanda at the time. Thousands of widows, many subjected to rape, contracted HIV. There were about 400,000 orphans and nearly 85,000 of them were forced to become heads of families. An estimated 2,000,000 Rwandans, mostly Hutu, were displaced and became refugees. Additionally, 30% of the pygmy Batwa were killed.

=== Means of killing ===
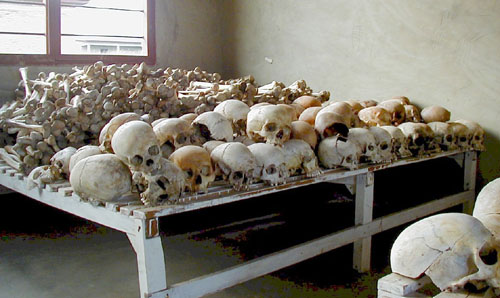
Skulls and other bones kept at Murambi Technical School

On 9 April, UN observers witnessed the massacre of children at a Polish church in Gikondo. That same day, 1,000 heavily armed and well-trained European troops arrived to evacuate European civilians from Rwanda. The troops did not stay to assist UNAMIR. Media coverage picked up on the 9th, as The Washington Post reported the execution of Rwandan employees of relief agencies in front of their expatriate colleagues.

Butare prefecture was an exception to the local violence. Jean-Baptiste Habyalimana was the only Tutsi prefect, and the prefecture was the only one dominated by an opposition party. Opposing the genocide, Habyalimana was able to keep relative calm in the prefecture, until he was deposed by the extremist Sylvain Nsabimana. Finding the population of Butare resistant to murdering their citizens, the government flew in militia from Kigali by helicopter, who readily killed the Tutsi.

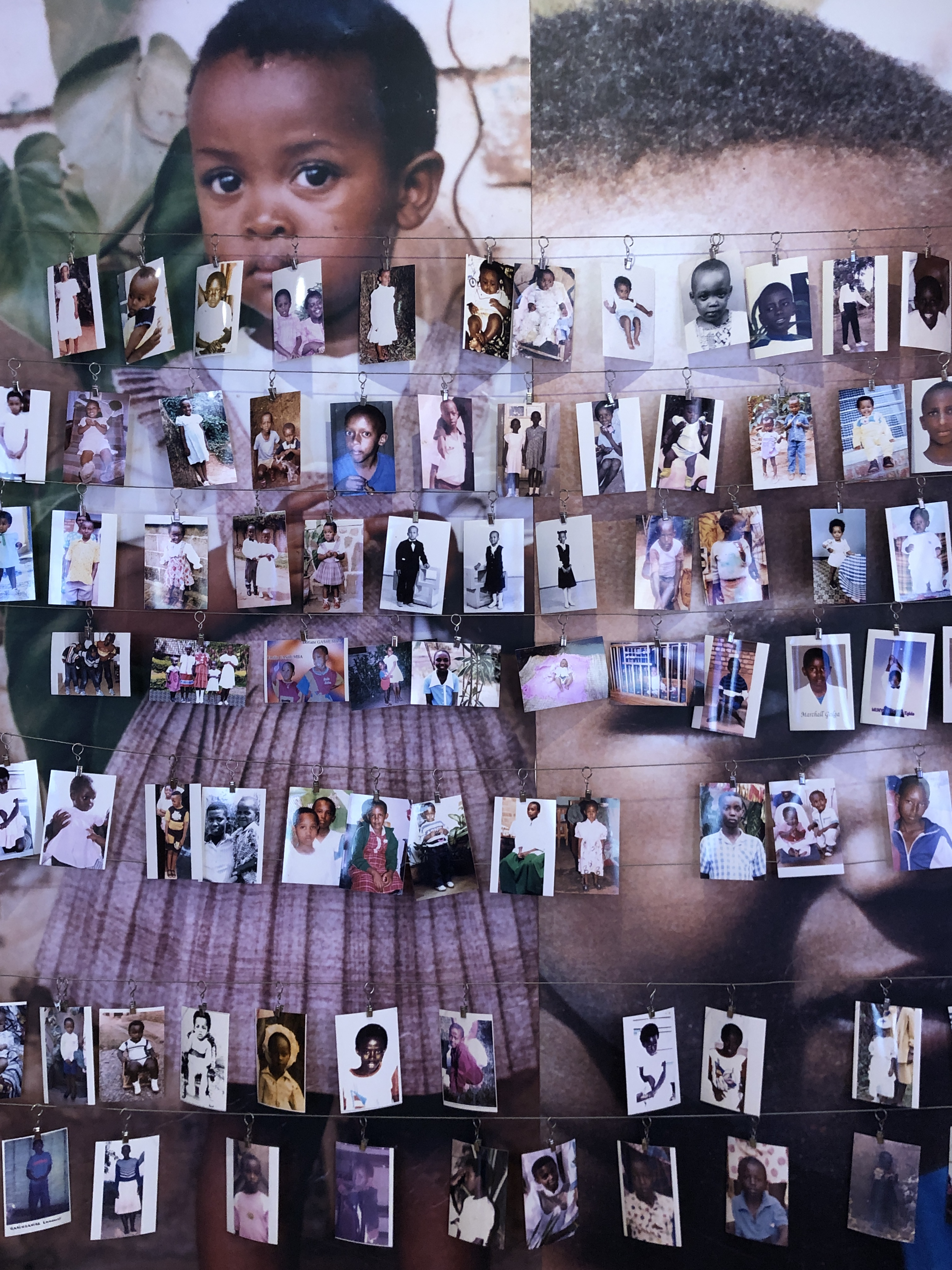
Photographs of genocide victims displayed at the Genocide Memorial Center in Kigali

Most victims were killed in their own villages or in towns, often by neighbors and fellow villagers. The militia typically used machetes, although some army units used rifles. Hutu gangs searched for victims hiding in churches and school buildings and massacred them. Local officials and government-sponsored radio incited ordinary citizens to kill their neighbors, and those who refused to kill were often murdered on the spot: "Either you took part in the massacres or you were massacred yourself."

One such massacre occurred at Nyarubuye. On 12 April, more than 1,500 Tutsi sought refuge in a Catholic church in Nyange, then in Kivumu commune. Local Interahamwe, acting in concert with the authorities, used bulldozers to knock down the church building. The militia used machetes and rifles to kill every person who tried to escape. Local priest Athanase Seromba was later found guilty and sentenced to life in prison by the ICTR for his role in the demolition of his church; he was convicted of the crime of genocide and crimes against humanity. In another case, thousands sought refuge in the Official Technical School (École technique officielle) in Kigali where Belgian UNAMIR soldiers were stationed. On 11 April, the Belgian soldiers withdrew, and Rwandan armed forces and militia killed all the Tutsi.

=== Sexual violence ===
Rape was used as a tool by the Interahamwe, the chief perpetrators, to separate the consciously heterogeneous population and to drastically exhaust the opposing group. The use of propaganda played an important role in both the genocide and the gender specific violence. The Hutu propaganda depicted Tutsi women as "a sexually seductive 'fifth column' in league with the Hutus' enemies". The exceptional brutality of the sexual violence, as well as the complicity of Hutu women in the attacks, suggests that the use of propaganda had been effective in the exploitation of gendered needs which had mobilized both females and males to participate. Soldiers of the Army for the Liberation of Rwanda and the Rwandan Defence Forces, including the Presidential Guard, and civilians also committed rape against mostly Tutsi women. Although Tutsi women were the main targets, moderate Hutu women were also raped.

Along with the Hutu moderates, Hutu women who were married to or who hid Tutsis were also targeted. In his 1996 report on Rwanda, the UN Special Rapporteur Rene Degni-Segui stated, "Rape was the rule and its absence was the exception." He also noted, "Rape was systematic and was used as a weapon." With this thought and using methods of force and threat, the genocidaires forced others to stand by during rapes. A testimonial by a woman of the name Marie Louise Niyobuhungiro recalled seeing local peoples, other generals and Hutu men watching her get raped about five times a day. Even when she was kept under watch of a woman, the woman would give no sympathy or help and furthermore forced her to farm land in between rapes.

Many of the survivors became infected with HIV from the HIV-infected men recruited by the genocidaires. During the conflict, Hutu extremists released hundreds of patients suffering from AIDS from hospitals, and formed them into "rape squads". The intent was to infect and cause a "slow, inexorable death" for their future Tutsi rape victims. Tutsi women were also targeted with the intent of destroying their reproductive capabilities. Sexual mutilation sometimes occurred after the rape and included mutilation of the vagina with machetes, knives, sharpened sticks, boiling water, and acid. Men were also the victims of sexual violation, including public mutilation of the genitals.

Some experts have estimated that between 250,000 and 500,000 women were raped during the genocide.

== Rwandan Civil War ==
=== 1990 invasion and death of Rwigyema ===
On 1 October 1990 fifty RPF rebels deserted their Ugandan Army posts and crossed the border from Uganda into Rwanda, killing a Rwandan customs guard at the Kagitumba border post and forcing others to flee. They were followed by hundreds more rebels, dressed in the uniforms of the Ugandan national army and carrying stolen Ugandan weaponry, including machine guns, autocannons, mortars, and Soviet BM-21 multiple rocket launchers. According to RPF estimates, around 2,500 of the Ugandan Army's 4,000 Rwandan soldiers took part in the invasion, accompanied by 800 civilians, including medical staff and messengers. Both President Yoweri Museveni of Uganda and President Habyarimana of Rwanda were in New York City attending the United Nations World Summit for Children. In the first few days of fighting, the RPF advanced 60 km (37 mi) south to Gabiro. Their Rwandan Armed Forces opponents, fighting for Habyarimana's government, were numerically superior, with 5,200 soldiers, and possessed armoured cars and helicopters supplied by France, but the RPF benefited from the element of surprise. The Ugandan government set up roadblocks across the west of Uganda, to prevent further desertions and to block the rebels from returning to Uganda.

On 2 October the RPF leader Fred Rwigyema was shot in the head and killed. The exact circumstances of Rwigyema's death are disputed; the official line of Kagame's government, and the version mentioned by historian Gérard Prunier in his 1995 book on the subject, was that Rwigyema was killed by a stray bullet. In his 2009 book Africa's World War, Prunier says Rwigyema was killed by his subcommander Peter Bayingana, following an argument over tactics. According to this account, Rwigyema was conscious of the need to move slowly and attempt to win over the Hutu in Rwanda before assaulting Kigali, whereas Bayingana and fellow subcommander Chris Bunyenyezi wished to strike hard and fast, to achieve power as soon as possible. The argument boiled over, causing Bayingana to shoot Rwigyema dead. Another senior RPF officer, Stephen Nduguta, witnessed this shooting and informed President Museveni; Museveni sent his brother Salim Saleh to investigate, and Saleh ordered Bayingana's and Bunyenyezi's arrests and eventual executions.

When news of the RPF offensive broke, Habyarimana requested assistance from France in fighting the invasion. The French president's son, Jean-Christophe Mitterrand, was head of the government's Africa Cell and promised to send troops. On the night of 4 October, gunfire was heard in Kigali in a mysterious attack, which was attributed to RPF commandos. The attack was most likely staged by the Rwandan authorities, seeking to convince the French the regime was in imminent danger. (Note: Many sources report that the attack was staged: André Guichaoua also finds that the most convincing explanation, but writes that it remains open to debate.) As a result, 600 French soldiers arrived in Rwanda the following day, twice as many as initially pledged. The French operation was code-named Noroît and its official purpose was to protect French nationals. In reality the mission was to support Habyarimana's regime and the French parachute companies immediately set up positions blocking the RPF advance to the capital and Kigali International Airport. Belgium and Zaire also sent troops to Kigali in early October. The Belgian troops were deployed primarily to defend the country's citizens living in Rwanda but after a few days it became clear they were not in danger. Instead, the deployment created a political controversy as news reached Brussels of arbitrary arrests and massacres by the Habyarimana regime and its failure to deal with the underlying causes of the war. Faced with a growing domestic dispute over the issue, and with no obvious prospect of achieving peace, the Belgian government withdrew its troops by the beginning of November. Belgium provided no further military support to the Habyarimana government. Zairian President Mobutu Sese Seko's contribution was to send several hundred troops of the elite Special Presidential Division (DSP). Unlike the French, the Zairian troops went straight to the front line and began fighting the RPF, but their discipline was poor. The Zairian soldiers raped Rwandan civilians in the north of the country and looted their homes, prompting Habyarimana to expel them back to Zaire within a week of their arrival. With French assistance, and benefiting from the loss of RPF morale after Rwigyema's death, the Rwandan Army enjoyed a major tactical advantage. By the end of October they had regained all the ground taken by the RPF and pushed the rebels all the way back to the Ugandan border. Many soldiers deserted; some crossed back into Uganda and others went into hiding in the Akagera National Park. Habyarimana accused the Ugandan Government of supplying the RPF, establishing a "rear command" for the group in Kampala, and "flagging off" the invasion. The Rwandan Government announced on 30 October that the war was over.

The Rwandan Government used the attack on Kigali on 4 October as the pretext for the arbitrary arrest of more than 8,000 mostly Tutsi political opponents. Tutsi were increasingly viewed with suspicion; Radio Rwanda aired incitement to ethnic hatred and a pogrom was organised by local authorities on 11 October in the Kibilira commune of Gisenyi Province, killing 383 Tutsi. The burgomaster and the sous-préfet were dismissed from their posts and jailed, but released soon thereafter. It was the first time in nearly twenty years that massacres against Tutsi were perpetrated, as anti-Tutsi violence under the Habyarimana regime had been only low level up to that point.

=== RPF attack on Ruhengeri, January 1991 ===
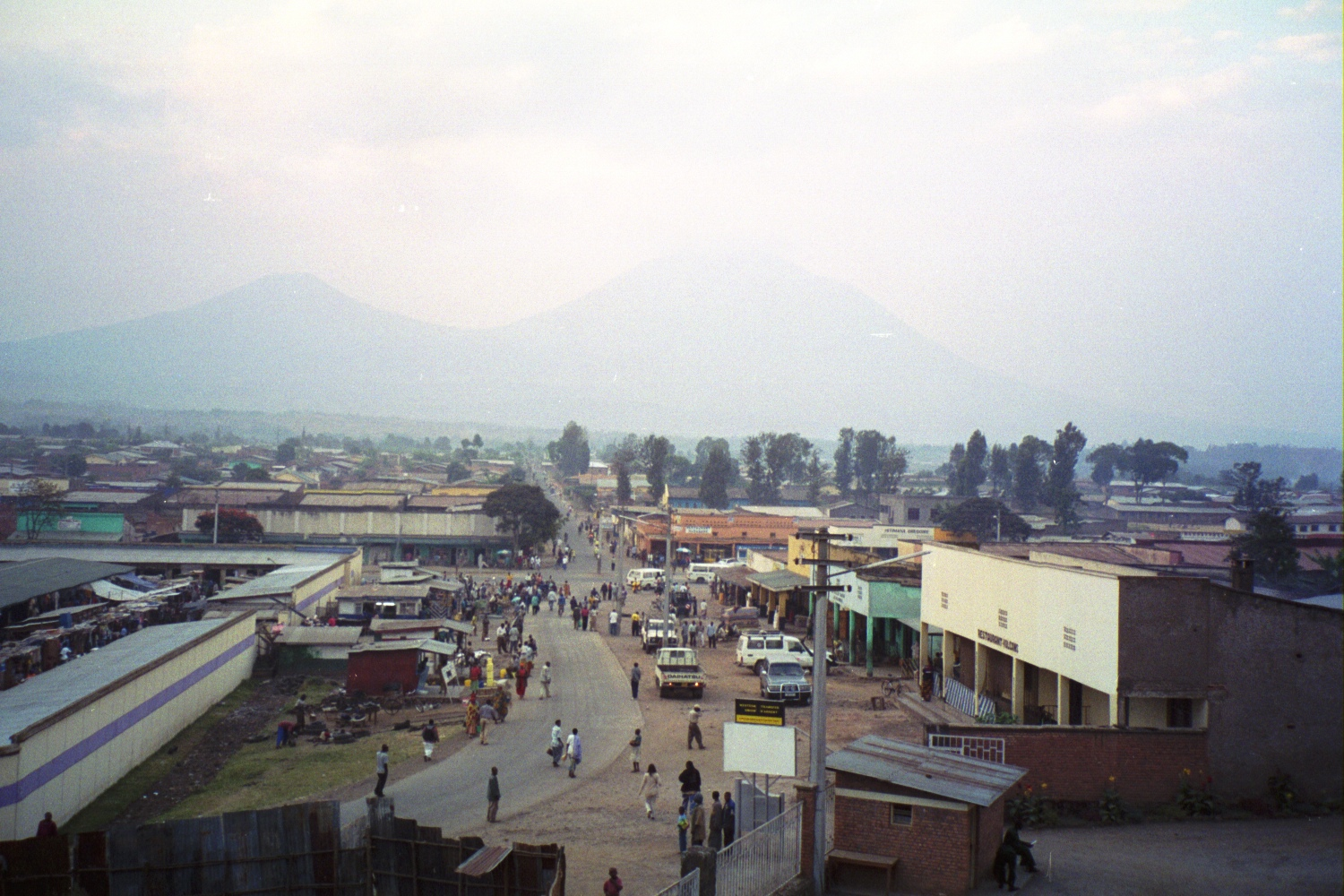
The town of Ruhengeri, with the Virunga Mountains in the background

After three months of regrouping, Kagame decided in January 1991 that the RPF was ready to fight again. The target for the first attack was the northern city of Ruhengeri, south of the Virunga mountains. The city was the only provincial capital that could be attacked quickly from the Virungas while maintaining an element of surprise. Kagame also favoured an attack on Ruhengeri for cultural reasons. President Habyarimana, as well as his wife and her powerful family, came from the north-west of Rwanda and most Rwandans regarded the region as the heartland of the regime. An attack there guaranteed the population would become aware of the RPF's presence and Kagame hoped this would destabilise the government.

During the night of 22 January, seven hundred RPF fighters descended from the mountains into hidden locations around the city, assisted by RPF sympathisers living in the area. They attacked on the morning of 23 January. The Rwandan forces were taken by surprise and were mostly unable to defend against the invasion. The Rwandan Police and army succeeded in briefly repelling the invasion in areas around their stations, killing large numbers of rebel fighters in the process. It is likely the Rwandan Army forces were assisted by French troops, as the French Government later rewarded around fifteen French paratroopers for having taken part in the rearguard. By noon, the defending forces were defeated and the RPF held the whole city. Most of the civilian population fled.

One of the principal RPF targets in Ruhengeri was the prison, which was Rwanda's largest. When he learnt of the invasion the warden, Charles Uwihoreye, telephoned the government in Kigali to request instructions. He spoke to Colonel Elie Sagatwa, one of the akazu, who ordered him to kill every inmate in the prison to avoid escape and defections during the fighting. He also wanted to prevent high-profile political prisoners and former insiders from sharing secret information with the RPF. Uwihoreye refused to obey, even after Sagatwa called him and repeated the order, having confirmed it with the president. Eventually, the RPF stormed the buildings and the prisoners were liberated. Several prisoners were recruited into the RPF, including Théoneste Lizinde, a former close ally of President Habyarimana, who had been arrested following a failed coup attempt in 1980.

The RPF forces held Ruhengeri through the afternoon of 23 January, before withdrawing into the mountains for the night. The raid undermined the Rwandan Government's claims that the RPF had been ejected from the country and had been reduced to conducting guerrilla operations from Uganda. The government sent troops to the city the following day and a state of emergency was declared, with strict curfews in Ruhengeri and the surrounding area. The RPF raided the city almost every night for several months, fighting with Rwandan army forces, and the country was back at war for the first time since the October invasion.

=== Guerrilla war, 1991–1992 ===
Following the action in Ruhengeri the RPF again began to wage guerrilla war. The Rwandan Army massed troops across the north of the country, occupying key positions and shelling RPF hideouts in the Virunga mountains, but the mountainous terrain prevented them from launching an all-out assault. Paul Kagame's troops attacked the Rwandan Army forces repeatedly and frequently, keen to ensure the diplomatic and psychological effect of the RPF's resurgence was not lost. Kagame employed tactics such as attacking simultaneously in up to ten locations across the north of the country, to prevent his opponents from concentrating their force in any one place. This low intensity war continued for many months, both sides launching successful attacks on the other, and neither able to gain the upper hand in the war. The RPF made some territorial gains including capturing the border town of Gatuna. This was significant as it blocked Rwanda's access to the port of Mombasa via the Northern Corridor, forcing all trade to go through Tanzania via the longer and costlier Central Corridor. By late 1991 the RPF controlled 5% of Rwanda, setting up its new headquarters in an abandoned tea factory near Mulindi, Byumba province. Many Hutu civilians in areas captured by the RPF fled to government-held areas, creating a large population of internally displaced persons in the country.

The renewed warfare had two effects in Rwanda. The first was a resurgence of violence against Tutsi still in the country. Hutu activists killed up to 1,000 Tutsi in attacks authorised by local officials, starting with the slaughter of 30–60 Bagogwe Tutsi pastoralists near Kinigi and then moving south and west to Ruhengeri and Gisenyi. These attacks continued until June 1991, when the government introduced measures to allow potential victims to move to safer areas such as Kigali. The akazu also began a major propaganda campaign, broadcasting and publishing material designed to persuade the Hutu population that the Tutsi were a separate and alien people, non-Christians seeking to re-establish the old Rwandan feudal monarchy with the final goal of enslaving the Hutu. This included the Hutu Ten Commandments, a set of "rules" published in the Kangura magazine, mandating Hutu supremacy in all aspects of Rwandan life. In response the RPF opened its own propaganda radio station, Radio Muhabura, which broadcast from Uganda into Rwanda. This was never hugely popular but gained listenership during 1992 and 1993.

The second development was that President Habyarimana announced that he was introducing multi-party politics into the country, following intense pressure from the international community, including his most loyal ally France. Habyarimana had originally promised this in mid-1990, and opposition groups had formed in the months since, including the Republican Democratic Movement (MDR), Social Democratic Party (PSD) and the Liberal Party (PL), but the one-party state law had remained in place. In mid-1991 Habyarimana officially allowed multi-party politics to begin, a change that saw a plethora of new parties come into existence. Many had manifestos which favoured full democracy and rapprochement with the RPF, but these were quite ineffective and had no political influence. The older opposition groups registered themselves as official parties and the country was notionally moving towards a multi-party inclusive cabinet with proper representation, but progress was continually hampered by the regime. The last opposition party to form was the Coalition for the Defence of the Republic (CDR), which was more hardline Hutu than Habyarimana's own party and had close links to the akazu.

Progress remained slow in 1991 and 1992. A cabinet set up in October 1991 contained almost no opposition, and the administrative hierarchy across the country recognised the authority of only Habyarimana's National Republican Movement for Democracy and Development party. Another one-party cabinet was announced in January 1992 which prompted large scale protests in Kigali, forcing Habyarimana to make real concessions. He announced his intention to negotiate with the RPF, and formed a multi-party cabinet in April. This was still dominated by Habyarimana's party, but with opposition figures in some key positions. The opposition members of this cabinet met with the RPF, and negotiated a ceasefire. In July 1992 the rebels agreed to stop fighting, and the parties began peace negotiations in the Tanzanian city of Arusha.

=== Peace process, 1992–1993 ===
The peace process was complicated by the fact that four distinct groups were involved, each with its own agenda. The Hutu hardliners, centred around the family of Agathe Habyarimana, were represented by the CDR as well as extremists within the president's own MRND party. The second group was the official opposition, which excluded the CDR. They had much more democratic and conciliatory aims but were also deeply suspicious of the RPF, whom they saw as trying to upset the "democratic" policy of Hutu rule established in the 1959 revolution. The third group was the RPF. Paul Kagame engaged with the peace process against the advice of some of his senior officers, in the knowledge that many of those on the other side of the table were hardliners who were not sincerely interested in negotiations. He feared that shunning the opportunity for peace would weaken the RPF politically and lose them international goodwill. Finally there was the group representing President Habyarimana himself, who sought primarily to hold on to his power in whatever form he could. This meant publicly striving for a middle ground compromise solution, but privately obstructing the process and trying to delay change to the status quo for as long as possible. Habyarimana recognised the danger posed to him by the radical Hutu faction and attempted in mid-1992 to remove them from senior army positions. This effort was only partially successful; akazu affiliates Augustin Ndindiliyimana and Théoneste Bagosora remained in influential posts, providing them with a link to power.

The delegates at the negotiations in Arusha made some progress in the latter half of 1992, despite wrangling between Habyarimana and hardline members of his party that compromised the government officials' negotiating power. In August the parties agreed to a "pluralistic transitional government", which would include the RPF. The CDR and hardline faction of the MRND reacted violently to this. Feeling sidelined by the developing Arusha process, they began killing Tutsi civilians in the Kibuye area; 85 were killed, and 500 homes burnt. Historian Gérard Prunier names late 1992 as the time when the idea of a genocidal "final solution" to kill every Tutsi in Rwanda was first mooted. Hardliners were busy setting up parallel institutions within the official organs of state, including the army, from which they hoped to effect a move away from the more conciliatory tone adopted by Habyarimana and the moderate opposition. Their goal was to take over from Habyarimana's government as the perceived source of power in the country amongst the Hutu masses, to maintain the line that the RPF and Tutsi more generally were a threat to Hutu freedoms, and to find a way to thwart any agreement negotiated in Arusha.

The situation deteriorated in early 1993 when the teams in Arusha signed a full power-sharing agreement, dividing government positions between the MRND, RPF and other major opposition parties, but excluding the CDR. This government was supposed to rule the country under a transitional constitution until free and fair elections could be held. The agreement reflected the balance of power at the time; Habyarimana, the mainstream opposition, and the RPF all accepted it, but the CDR and hardline MRND officers were violently opposed. MRND national secretary Mathieu Ngirumpatse announced that the party would not respect the agreement, contradicting the president and the party's negotiators in Arusha. The MRND hardliners organised demonstrations across the country and mobilised their supporters within the army and populace to begin a much larger killing spree than those that had previously occurred. The violence engulfed the whole north-west of Rwanda and lasted for six days; many houses were burned and hundreds of Tutsi killed.

=== RPF offensive, February 1993 ===
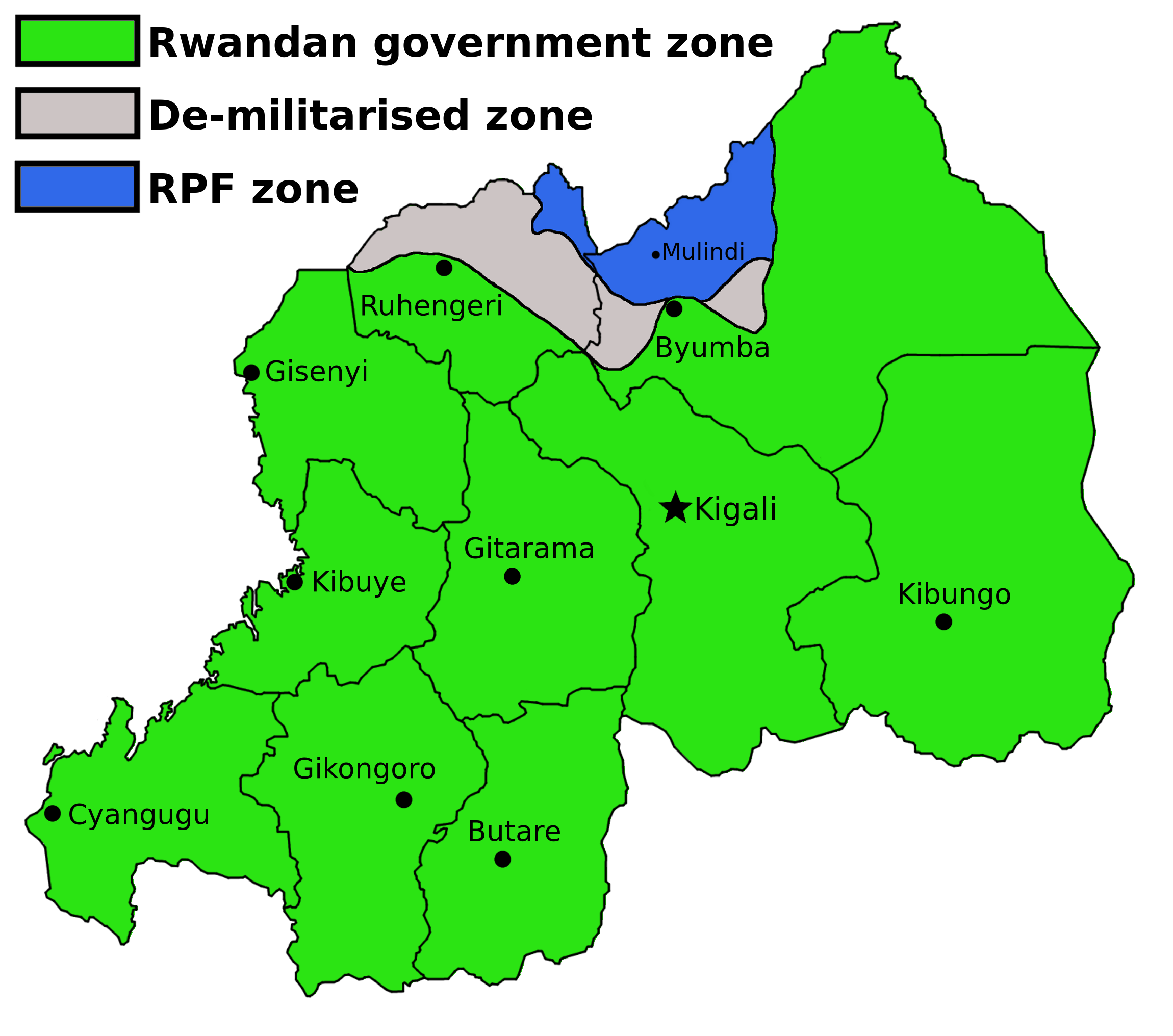
The partition of Rwanda following the RPF offensive in February 1993. For the first time, the Rwandan Government acknowledged that it had lost part of the country.

Paul Kagame responded by pulling out of the Arusha process and resuming the war, ending the six-month cease-fire. The RPF cited the CDR and MRND-hardliner violence as its reason for this, but according to foreign policy scholar Bruce D. Jones the offensive may actually have been intended primarily to increase the rebels' bargaining power at the peace talks. The next subject for the negotiations was the proportion of troops and officers to be allocated to each side in the new unified army. By demonstrating its military power in the field, through a successful offensive against the Rwandan Government forces, the RPF was able to secure an increased percentage of troops in the agreement.

The RPF began its offensive on 8 February, fighting southwards from the territory it already held in Rwanda's northern border regions. In contrast to the October 1990 and 1991–1992 campaigns, the RPF advance in 1993 was met by weak resistance from the Rwandan Army forces. The likely reason was a significant deterioration in morale and military experience within the government forces. The impact of the long-running war on the economy, and a heavy devaluation of the Rwandan franc, had left the government struggling to pay its soldiers regularly. The armed forces had also expanded rapidly, at one point growing from less than 10,000 troops to almost 30,000 in one-year. The new recruits were often poorly disciplined and not battle ready, with a tendency to get drunk and carry out abuse and rapes of civilians.

The RPF advance continued unchecked in February, its forces moving steadily south and gaining territory without opposition. They took Ruhengeri on the first day of fighting, and later the city of Byumba. Local Hutu civilians fled en masse from the areas the RPF were taking, most of them ending up in refugee camps on the outskirts of Kigali. The civilian cost of the offensive is unclear; according to André Guichaoua several thousand were killed, while Prunier labelled the RPF killing as "small-scale". This violence alienated the rebels from their potential allies in the democratic Rwandan opposition parties.

When it became clear that the Rwandan Army was losing ground to the RPF, Habyarimana requested urgent assistance from France. Fearing that the RPF could soon be in a position to seize Kigali, the French immediately dispatched 150 troops to Rwanda, along with arms and ammunition, to bolster the Rwandan Army forces. A further 250 French soldiers were sent on 20 February. The arrival of French troops in Kigali significantly changed the military situation on the ground. The RPF now found themselves under attack, French shells bombarding them as they advanced southwards.

By 20 February the RPF had advanced to within 30 km (19 mi) of the capital, Kigali, and many observers believed an assault on the city was imminent. The assault did not take place, and the RPF instead declared a cease-fire. Whether or not the RPF intended to advance on the capital is unknown. Kagame later said his aim at this point was to inflict as much damage as possible on Rwandan Army forces, capture their weapons, and gain ground slowly, but not to attack the capital or seek to end the war with an outright RPF victory. Kagame told journalist and author Stephen Kinzer such a victory would have ended international goodwill towards the RPF and led to charges that the war had simply been a bid to replace the Hutu state with a Tutsi one. The increased presence of French troops and the fierce loyalty of the Hutu population to the government meant an invasion of Kigali would not have been achieved with the same ease that the RPF had conquered the north. Fighting for the capital would have been a much more difficult and dangerous operation. Several of Kagame's senior officers urged him to go for outright victory but he overruled them. By the end of the February war more than a million civilians, mostly Hutu, had left their homes in the country's largest exodus to date.

=== Arusha Accords and rise of Hutu Power, 1993–1994 ===
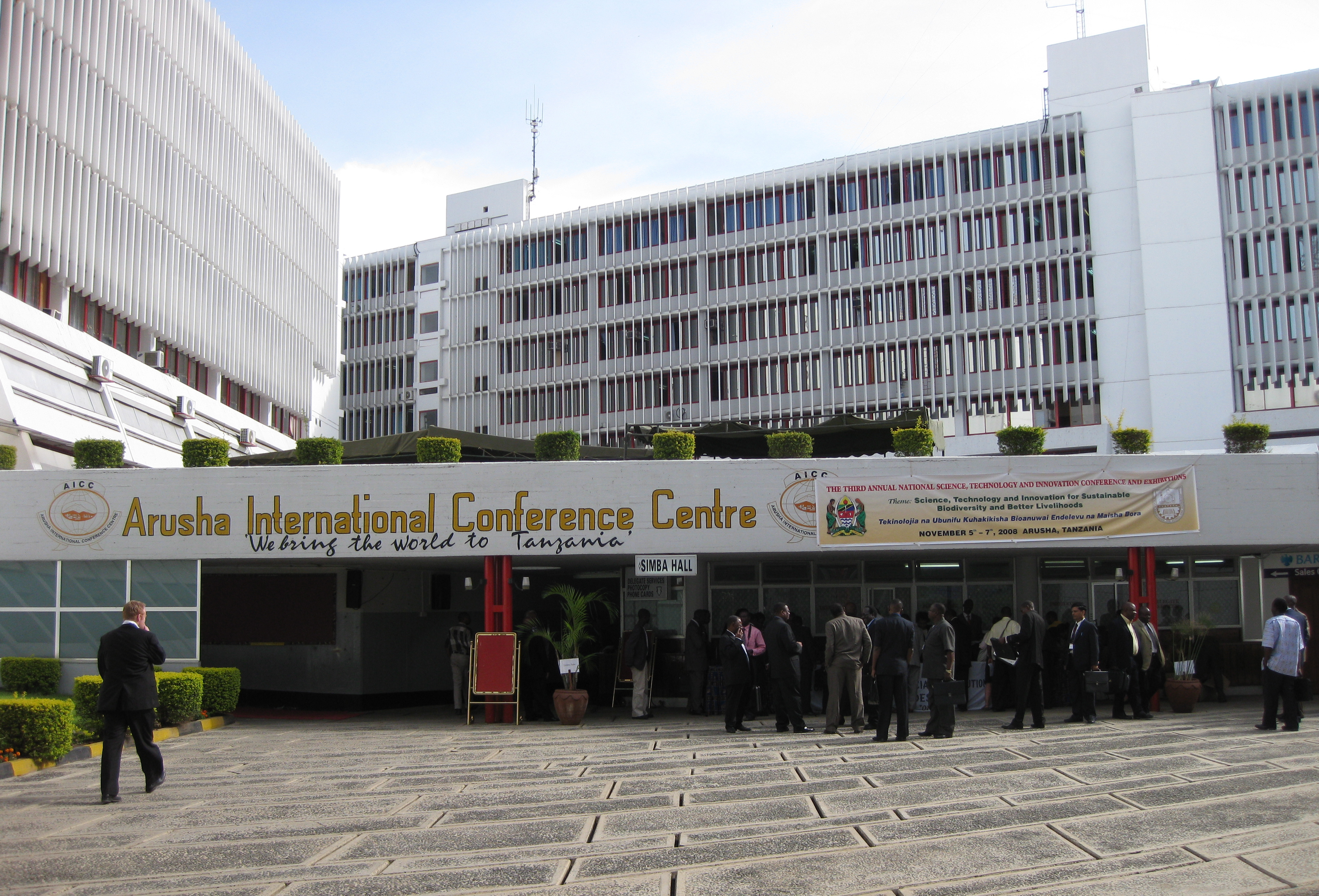
The Arusha International Conference Centre, venue for peace talks to end the war

The RPF cease-fire was followed by two days of negotiations in the Ugandan capital Kampala, attended by RPF leader Paul Kagame, and involving President Museveni and representatives of European nations. The Europeans insisted that RPF forces withdraw to the zone they had held before the February offensive. Kagame responded that he would agree to this only if the Rwandan army were forbidden from re-entering the newly conquered territory. Following a threat by Kagame to resume fighting and potentially take even more territory, the two sides reached a compromise deal. This entailed the RPF withdrawing to its pre-February territory, but also mandated the setting up of a demilitarised zone between the RPF area and the rest of the country. The deal was significant because it marked a formal concession by Habyarimana's regime of the northern zone to the rebels, recognising the RPF hold on that territory. There were many within the RPF senior command who felt Kagame had ceded too much, because the deal meant not only withdrawal to the pre-February boundaries, but also a promise not to encroach on the demilitarised zone. This therefore ended RPF ambitions of capturing more territory. Kagame used the authority he had accumulated through his successful leadership of the RPF to override these concerns, and the parties returned once more to the negotiating table in Arusha.

Despite the agreement and ongoing negotiations President Habyarimana, supported by the French Government, spent the subsequent months forging a "common front" against the RPF. This included members of his own party and the CDR and also factions from each of the other opposition parties in the power-sharing coalition. At the same time other members of the same parties issued a statement, in conjunction with the RPF, in which they condemned French involvement in the country and called for the Arusha process to be respected in full. The hardline factions within the parties became known as Hutu Power, a movement which transcended party politics. Apart from the CDR there was no party that was exclusively part of the Power movement. All major parties, save the Social Democrats, had "moderate" and "Power" wings, with members of both camps claiming to represent the legitimate leadership of that party. Even the ruling party contained a Power wing, consisting of those who opposed Habyarimana's intention to sign a peace deal. Several radical youth militia groups emerged, attached to the Power wings of the parties; these included the Interahamwe, which was attached to the MRND, and the CDR's Impuzamugambi. The youth militia began actively carrying out massacres across the country. The army trained the militias, sometimes in conjunction with the French, who were unaware the training they provided was being used to perpetrate the mass killings.

By June President Habyarimana had come to view Hutu Power, rather than the mainstream opposition, as the biggest threat to his leadership. This led him to change tactics and engage fully with the Arusha peace process, giving it the impetus it needed to draw to a completion. According to Prunier this support was more symbolic than genuine. Habyarimana believed he could maintain power more easily through a combination of limited concessions to the opposition and RPF than he could if Hutu Power were allowed to disrupt the peace process. The negotiation of troop numbers was protracted and difficult; twice the talks almost collapsed. The Rwandan Government wanted to allocate only 15% of the officer corps to the RPF, reflecting the proportion of Tutsi in the country, while the RPF was arguing for a 50/50 split. The RPF were in a superior position following their successful February campaign and were backed in their demands by Tanzania, which was chairing the talks. The government eventually agreed to their demands. As well as 50% of the officer corps, the RPF was allocated up to 40% of the non-command troops. The deal also mandated large-scale demobilisation; of the 35,000 Rwandan Army and 20,000 RPF soldiers at the time of the accords, only 19,000 would be drafted into the new national army. With all details agreed the Arusha Accords were finally signed on 4 August 1993 at a formal ceremony attended by President Habyarimana as well as heads of state from neighbouring countries.

An uneasy peace was once again entered into, which would last until 7 April of the following year. The agreement called for a United Nations peacekeeping force; this was titled the United Nations Assistance Mission for Rwanda (UNAMIR), and was in place in Rwanda by October 1993 under the command of Canadian General Roméo Dallaire. Another stipulation of the agreement was that the RPF would station diplomats in Kigali at the Conseil national de développement (CND), now known as the Chamber of Deputies, Rwanda's Parliament building. These men were protected by 600–1,000 RPF soldiers, who arrived in Kigali through UNAMIR's Operation Clean Corridor in December 1993. Meanwhile, the Hutu Power wings of the various parties were beginning plans for a genocide. The president of Burundi, Melchior Ndadaye, who had been elected in June as the country's first ever Hutu president, was assassinated by extremist Tutsi army officers in October 1993. The assassination reinforced the notion among Hutus that the Tutsi were their enemy and could not be trusted. The CDR and the Power wings of the other parties realised they could use this situation to their advantage. The idea of a "final solution", which had first been suggested in 1992 but had remained a fringe viewpoint, was now top of their agenda. An informant from the Interahamwe told UNAMIR officials a group of Hutu extremists were planning on disrupting the peace process and killing Tutsis in Kigali.

=== Military operations during the 1994 genocide ===

The cease-fire ended abruptly on 6 April 1994 when President Habyarimana's plane was shot down near Kigali Airport, killing both Habyarimana and the new President of Burundi, Cyprien Ntaryamira. The pair were returning home from a regional summit in Dar es Salaam at which the leaders of Kenya, Uganda, and Tanzania, had urged Habyarimana to stop delaying the implementation of the Arusha accords. The attackers remain unknown. Prunier, in his book written shortly after the incident, concluded that it was most likely a coup carried out by extreme Hutu members of Habyarimana's government. This theory was disputed in 2006 by French judge Jean-Louis Bruguière and in 2008 by Spanish judge Fernando Andreu. Both alleged that Kagame and the RPF were responsible. At the end of 2010 the judges succeeding Bruguière ordered a more thorough scientific examination, which employed experts in ballistics and acoustics. This report seemed to reaffirm the initial theory that Hutu extremists assassinated Habyarimana. But the report did not lead the judges to drop the charges against the RPF suspects; this was finally done in 2018, due to lack of evidence.

The shooting down of the plane served as the catalyst for the Rwandan genocide, which began within a few hours. A crisis committee was formed by the military, headed by Colonel Théoneste Bagosora, which refused to recognise Prime Minister Agathe Uwilingiyimana as leader, even though she was legally next in the line of political succession. UN commander General Dallaire labelled this a coup and insisted that Uwilingiyimana be placed in charge, but Bagosora refused. The Presidential Guard killed Uwilingiyimana and her husband during the night, along with ten Belgian UNAMIR soldiers charged with her protection and other prominent moderate politicians and journalists. The crisis committee appointed an interim government, still effectively controlled by Bagosora, which began ordering the systematic killing of huge numbers of Tutsi, as well as some politically moderate Hutu, through well-planned attacks. Over the course of approximately 100 days between 500,000 and 1,000,000 were killed.

On 7 April, as the genocide started, RPF commander Paul Kagame warned the interim government and the United Nations peacekeepers that he would resume the civil war if the killing did not stop. The next day Rwandan Army forces attacked the national parliament building from several directions but RPF troops stationed there successfully fought back. The RPF then crossed the demilitarised zone from their territory in the north and began an attack on three fronts, leaving their opponents unsure of their true intentions or whether an assault on Kigali was imminent. UNAMIR contingents in the demilitarised zone withdrew to their camps to avoid being caught in the fighting. Kagame refused to talk to the interim government, believing it was just a cover for Bagosora's rule and not committed to ending the genocide. Over the next few days the RPF moved steadily south through the eastern part of the country, capturing Gabiro and large areas of the countryside to the north and east of Kigali. Their unit stationed in Kigali was isolated from the rest of their forces but a unit of young soldiers successfully crossed government-held territory to link up with them. They avoided attacking Kigali or Byumba at this stage but conducted manoeuvres designed to encircle the cities and cut off supply routes. The RPF also allowed Tutsi refugees from Uganda to settle behind the front line in the RPF controlled areas.

In April there were numerous attempts by the United Nations forces to establish a cease-fire, but Kagame insisted each time that the RPF would not stop fighting unless the killings stopped. In late April the RPF secured the whole of the Tanzanian border area and began to move west from Kibungo, to the south of Kigali. They encountered little resistance except around Kigali and Ruhengeri. By 16 May they had cut the road between Kigali and Gitarama, the temporary home of the interim government, and by 13 June had taken Gitarama itself. The taking of Gitarama followed an unsuccessful attempt by the Rwandan Army forces to reopen the road. The interim government was forced to relocate to Gisenyi in the far north-west. As well as fighting the war Kagame recruited heavily at this time to expand the RPF. The new recruits included Tutsi survivors of the genocide and Rwandan Tutsi refugees who had been living in Burundi, but they were less well trained and disciplined than the earlier recruits.

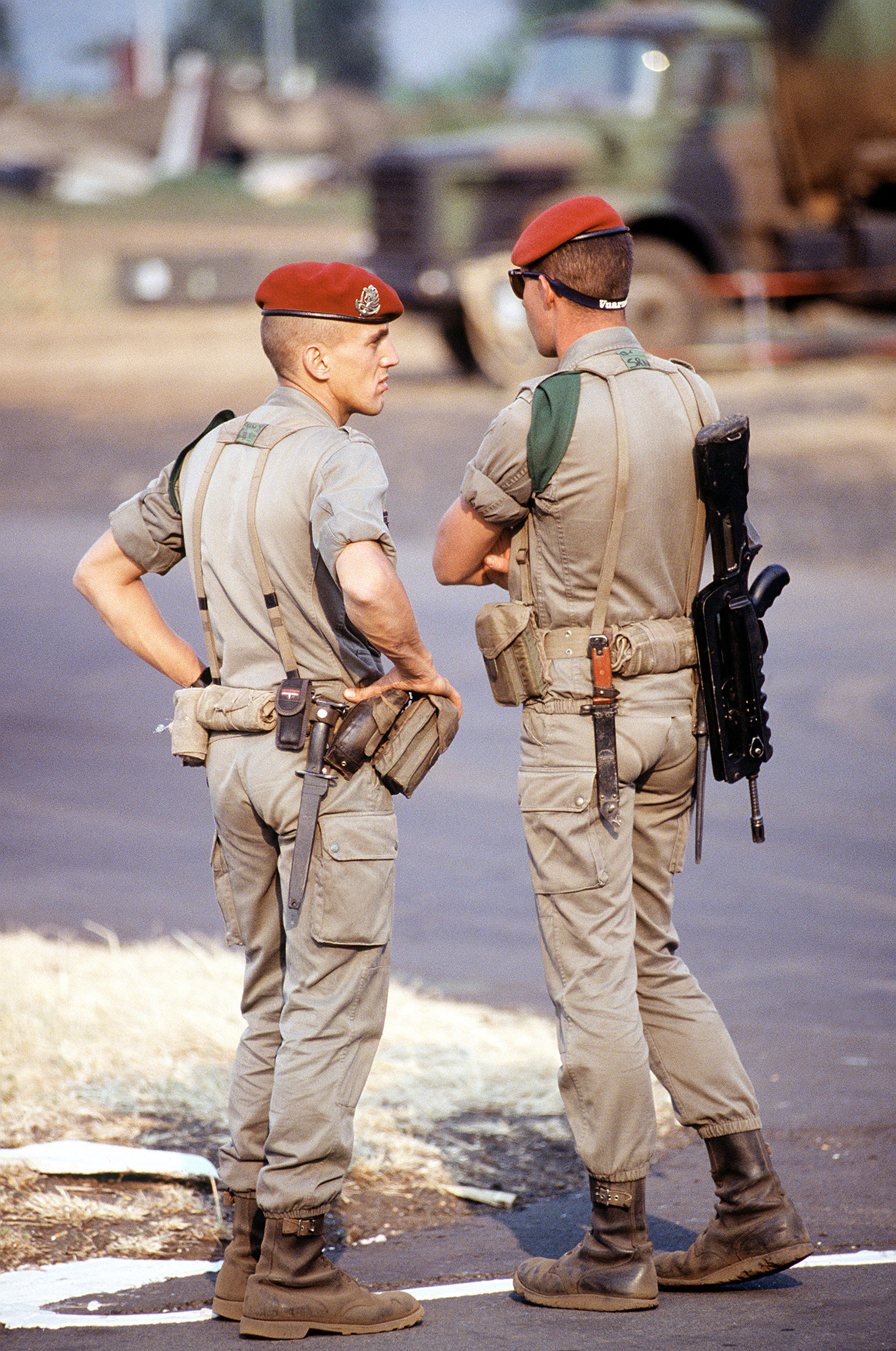
French soldiers in Kigali, August 1994

In late June 1994, France launched Opération Turquoise, a UN-mandated mission to create safe humanitarian areas for displaced persons, refugees, and civilians in danger. From bases in the Zairian cities of Goma and Bukavu, the French entered south-western Rwanda and established the Turquoise zone, within the Cyangugu–Kibuye–Gikongoro triangle, an area occupying approximately a fifth of Rwanda. Radio France International estimates that Turquoise saved around 15,000 lives, but with the genocide coming to an end and the RPF's ascendancy, many Rwandans interpreted Turquoise as a mission to protect the Hutus from the RPF, including some who had participated in the genocide. The French remained hostile to the RPF and their presence held up the RPF's advance in the south-west of the country. Opération Turquoise remained in Rwanda until 21 August 1994. French activity in Rwanda during the civil war later became a subject of much study and dispute, and generated an unprecedented debate about French foreign policy in Africa.

Having completed the encirclement of Kigali, the RPF spent the latter half of June fighting for the capital. The Rwandan Army forces had superior manpower and weapons, but the RPF steadily gained territory and conducted raids to rescue civilians from behind enemy lines. According to Dallaire, this success was due to Kagame's being a "master of psychological warfare"; he exploited the fact that the Rwandan Army were concentrating on the genocide rather than the fight for Kigali and exploited the government's loss of morale as it lost territory. The RPF finally defeated the Rwandan Army in Kigali on 4 July and on 18 July took Gisenyi and the rest of the north-west, forcing the interim government into Zaire. This RPF victory ended the genocide as well as the civil war. At the end of July 1994 Kagame's forces held the whole of Rwanda except for the Turquoise zone in the south-west. The date of the fall of Kigali, 4 July, was later designated Liberation Day by the RPF and is commemorated as a public holiday in Rwanda.

The UN peacekeeping force, UNAMIR, was in Rwanda during the genocide, but its Chapter VI mandate rendered it powerless to intervene militarily. Efforts by General Dallaire to broker peace were unsuccessful, and most of UNAMIR's Rwandan staff were killed in the early days of the genocide, severely limiting its ability to operate. Its most significant contribution was to provide refuge for thousands of Tutsi and moderate Hutu at its headquarters in Amahoro Stadium, as well as other secure UN sites, and to assist with the evacuation of foreign nationals. The Belgian Government, which had been one of the largest troop contributors to UNAMIR, pulled out in mid-April following the deaths of its ten soldiers protecting Prime Minister Uwilingiliyimana. In mid-May the UN conceded that "acts of genocide may have been committed", and agreed to reinforcement. The new soldiers started arriving in June, and following the end of the genocide in July they stayed to maintain security and stability, until the termination of their mission in 1996. Fifteen UN soldiers were killed in Rwanda between April and July 1994, including the ten Belgians, three Ghanaians, a Uruguayan, and Senegalese Mbaye Diagne who risked his life repeatedly to save Rwandans.

== Aftermath ==
The victorious RPF assumed control of Rwanda following the genocide, and as of 2026 remain the dominant political force in the country. They formed a government loosely based on the Arusha Accords, but Habyarimana's party was outlawed and the RPF took over the government positions allocated to it in the accords. The military wing of the RPF was renamed as the Rwandan Patriotic Army (RPA) and became the national army. Paul Kagame assumed the dual roles of Vice President of Rwanda and Minister of Defence; Pasteur Bizimungu, a Hutu who had been a civil servant under Habyarimana before fleeing to join the RPF, was appointed president. Bizimungu and his cabinet had some control over domestic affairs but Kagame remained commander-in-chief of the army and de facto ruler of the country.

The aftermath of the Rwandan Genocide and Civil War led to the Third Rwandese Republic's comparison to the Third Reich in the Western world.

The civil war severely disrupted Rwanda's formal economy, bringing coffee and tea cultivation to a halt, decimating tourism, diminishing food production, and diverting government spending towards defence and away from other priorities. Rwanda's infrastructure and economy suffered further during the genocide. Many buildings were uninhabitable and the former regime had taken all currency and moveable assets when they fled the country. Human resources were severely depleted, with over 40% of the population having fled or been killed. Women constituted about 70 percent of the population, as many men had fled or been killed. Outside of civilian deaths, 7,500 combatants had been killed during the war. (Note: The Knight Ridder media company estimated based on news reports that the war had killed 2,000 people in total before the genocide began.) Many of the remainder were traumatised: most had lost relatives, witnessed killings, or participated in the genocide. The long-term effects of war rape included social isolation, sexually transmitted diseases and unwanted pregnancies and babies, some women resorting to self-induced abortions. The army, led by Paul Kagame, maintained law and order while the government began the work of rebuilding the country's institutions and infrastructure.

Non-governmental organisations began to move back into the country but the international community did not provide significant assistance to the new regime. Most international aid was routed to the refugee camps which had formed in Zaire following the exodus of Hutu from Rwanda. Kagame strove to portray the government as inclusive and not Tutsi-dominated. He directed removal of ethnicity from citizens' national identity cards and the government began a policy of downplaying the distinctions between Hutu, Tutsi, and Twa.

External videos
- Presentation by Stephen Kinzer on A Thousand Hills: Rwanda's Rebirth and the Man Who Dreamt It, June 18, 2008, C-SPAN

During the genocide and in the months following the RPF victory, RPF soldiers killed many people they accused of participating in or supporting the genocide. The scale, scope, and source of ultimate responsibility of these killings is disputed. Human Rights Watch, as well as scholars such as Prunier, allege that the death toll might be as high as 100,000, and that Kagame and the RPF elite either tolerated or organised the killings. In an interview with Stephen Kinzer, Kagame acknowledged that killings had occurred but said they were carried out by rogue soldiers and had been impossible to control. The killings gained international attention after the 1995 Kibeho massacre, in which soldiers opened fire on a camp for internally displaced persons in Butare Province. Australian soldiers serving as part of UNAMIR estimated at least 4,000 people were killed; the Rwandan Government claimed the death toll was 338.

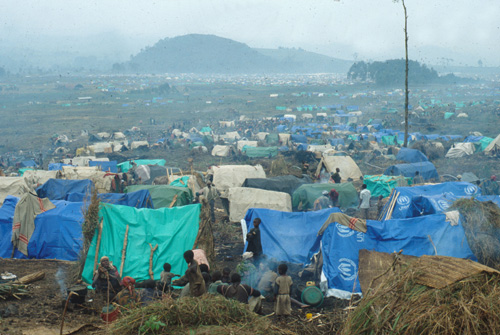
Refugee camp in Zaire, 1994

Following the RPF victory, approximately two million Hutu fled to refugee camps in neighbouring countries, particularly Zaire, fearing RPF reprisals for the Rwandan genocide. The camps were crowded and squalid and tens of thousands of refugees died in disease epidemics, including cholera and dysentery. They were set up by the United Nations High Commissioner for Refugees (UNHCR) but were effectively controlled by the army and government of the former Hutu regime, including many leaders of the genocide, who began to rearm in a bid to return to power in Rwanda.

By late 1996, Hutu militants from the camps were launching regular cross-border incursions and the RPF-led Rwandan Government launched a counter-offensive. Rwanda provided troops and military training to the Banyamulenge, a Tutsi group in the Zairian South Kivu province, helping them to defeat Zairian security forces. Rwandan forces, the Banyamulenge, and other Zairian Tutsi, then attacked the refugee camps, targeting the Hutu militia. These attacks caused hundreds of thousands of refugees to flee; many returned to Rwanda despite the presence of the RPF, while others ventured further west into Zaire. The refugees fleeing further into Zaire were relentlessly pursued by the RPA under the cover of the AFDL rebellion, killing an estimated 232,000 people. The defeated forces of the former regime continued a cross-border insurgency campaign, supported initially by the predominantly Hutu population of Rwanda's north-western provinces. By 1999 a programme of propaganda and Hutu integration into the national army succeeded in bringing the Hutu to the government side and the insurgency was defeated.

Paul Kagame took over the presidency from Pasteur Bizimungu in 2000 and began a large-scale national development drive, launching a programme to develop Rwanda as a middle income country by 2020. The country began developing strongly on key indicators, including the human development index, health care, and education. Annual growth between 2004 and 2010 averaged 8% per year, the poverty rate reduced from 57% to 45% between 2006 and 2011, and life expectancy rose from 46.6 years in 2000 to 64.3 years in 2018. A period of reconciliation began as well as the establishment of courts for trying genocide suspects. These included the International Criminal Tribunal for Rwanda (ICTR) and Gacaca, a traditional village court system reintroduced to handle the large caseloads involved. As women represented a larger share of the post-war population were not as frequently implicated in the genocide, they were entrusted by the regime with more tasks of reconciliation and reconstruction.

As well as dismantling the refugee camps, Kagame began planning a war to remove Mobutu. Mobutu had supported the genocidaires based in the camps and was also accused of allowing attacks on Tutsi people within Zaire. The Rwandan and Ugandan governments supported an alliance of four rebel groups headed by Laurent-Désiré Kabila, which began waging the First Congo War. The rebels quickly took control of North and South Kivu provinces and then advanced west, gaining territory from the poorly organised and demotivated Zairian army with little fighting. They controlled the whole country by May 1997. Mobutu fled into exile and the country was renamed the Democratic Republic of the Congo (DRC). Rwanda fell out with the new Congolese regime in 1998 and Kagame supported a fresh rebellion, leading to the Second Congo War. This lasted until 2003 and caused millions of deaths and severe damage. A 2010 United Nations report accused the Rwandan Patriotic Army of wide-scale human rights violations and crimes against humanity during the two Congo wars, charges denied by the Rwandan Government.

Paul Kagame took over the presidency from Pasteur Bizimungu in 2000 and began a large-scale national development drive, launching a programme to develop Rwanda as a middle income country by 2020. The country began developing strongly on key indicators, including the human development index, health care, and education. Annual growth between 2004 and 2010 averaged 8% per year, the poverty rate reduced from 57% to 45% between 2006 and 2011, and life expectancy rose from 46.6 years in 2000 to 64.3 years in 2018. A period of reconciliation began as well as the establishment of courts for trying genocide suspects. These included the International Criminal Tribunal for Rwanda (ICTR) and Gacaca, a traditional village court system reintroduced to handle the large caseloads involved. As women represented a larger share of the post-war population were not as frequently implicated in the genocide, they were entrusted by the regime with more tasks of reconciliation and reconstruction.

== Legacy ==
=== Justice system after genocide ===
The systematic destruction of the judicial system during the genocide and civil war was a major problem. After the genocide, over one million people (nearly one-fifth of the population remaining after the summer of 1994) were potentially culpable for a role in the genocide. The RPF pursued a policy of mass arrests for those responsible and for those persons who took part in the genocide, jailing over 100,000 people in the two years after the genocide. The pace of arrests overwhelmed the physical capacity of the Rwandan prison system, leading to what Amnesty International deemed "cruel, inhuman or degrading treatment". The country's 19 prisons were designed to hold about 18,000 inmates total, but at their peak in 1998 there were over 100,000 people in crowded detention facilities across the country.

Government institutions, including judicial courts, were destroyed, and many judges, prosecutors, and employees were murdered during the genocide. Of Rwanda's 750 judges, 506 did not remain after the genocide—many were murdered and most of the survivors fled Rwanda. By 1997, Rwanda only had 50 lawyers in its judicial system. These barriers caused the trials to proceed very slowly: with 130,000 suspects held in Rwandan prisons after the genocide, 3,343 cases were handled between 1996 and the end of 2000. Of those defendants, 20% received death sentences, 32% received life in prison, and 20% were acquitted. It was calculated that it would take over 200 years to conduct the trials of the suspects in prison—not including the ones who remained at large.

The RPF government began the long-awaited genocide trials, which had an uncertain start at the end of 1996 and inched forward in 1997. It was not until 1996 that courts finally began trials for genocide cases with the enactment of Organic Law No. 08/96 of 30 on 30 August 1996. This law initiated the prosecution of genocide crimes committed during the genocide and of crimes against humanity from October 1990. This law established the regular domestic courts as the core mechanism for responding to genocide until it was amended in 2001 to include the Gacaca courts. The Organic Law established four categories for those who were involved in the genocide, specifying the limits of punishment for members of each category. The first category was reserved those who were "planners, organizers, instigators, supervisors and leaders" of the genocide and any who used positions of state authority to promote the genocide. This category also applied to murderers who distinguished themselves on the basis of their zeal or cruelty, or who engaged in sexual torture. Members of this first category were eligible for the death sentence.

While Rwanda had the death penalty prior to the 1996 Organic law, in practice no executions had taken place since 1982. Twenty-two individuals, including Froduald Karamira, were executed by firing squad in public executions in April 1998. After this, Rwanda conducted no further executions, albeit it continued to issue death sentences until 2003. On 25 July 2007 the Organic Law Relating to the Abolition of the Death Penalty came into law, abolishing capital punishment and converting all existing death sentences to life in prison under solitary confinement. In parallel, the 2007 UN resolution presented and campaigns continued for a global moratorium on capital punishment.

=== Gacaca courts ===
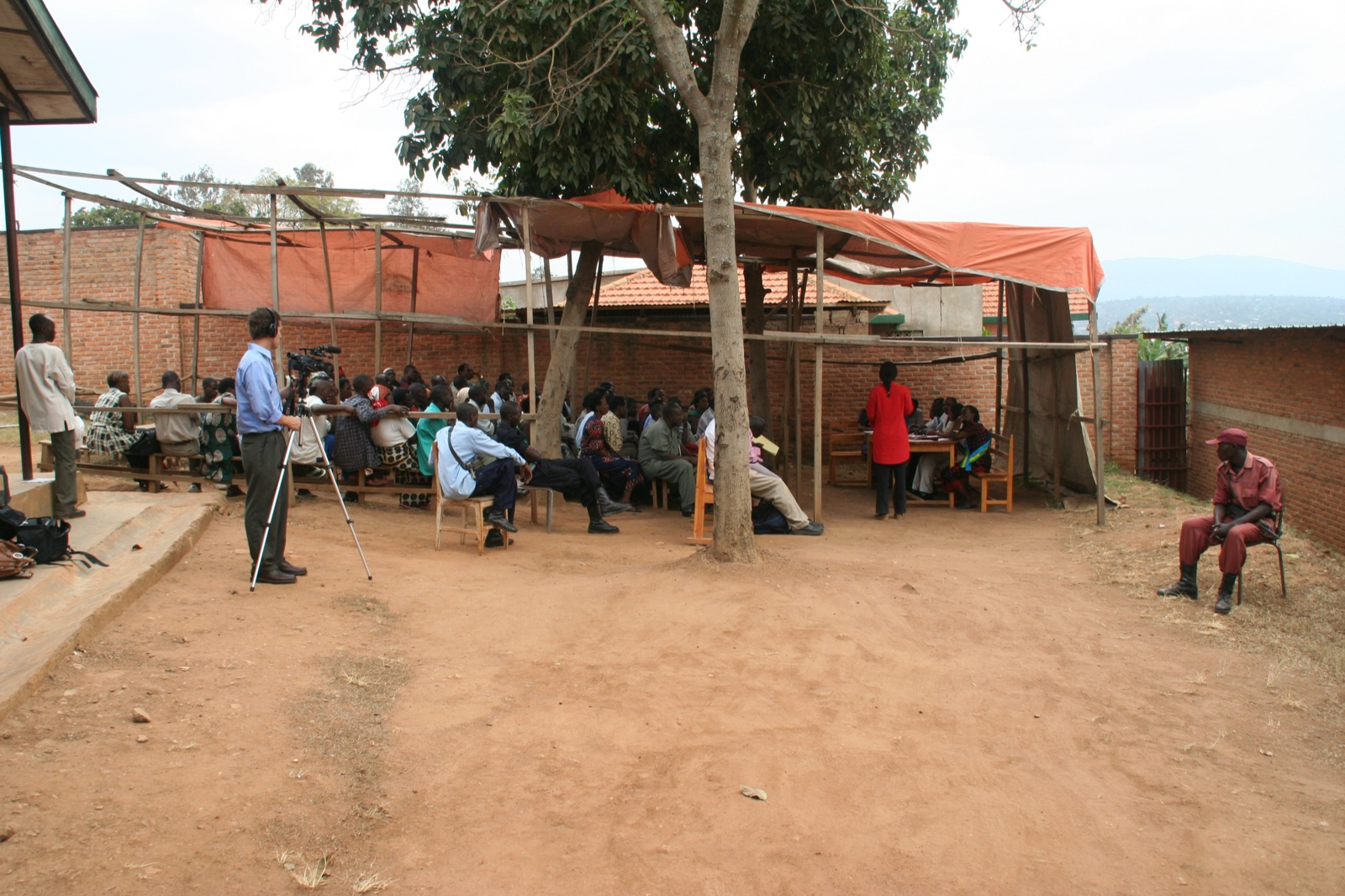
Gacaca

In response to the overwhelming number of potentially culpable individuals and the slow pace of the traditional judicial system, the government of Rwanda passed Organic Law No. 40/2000 in 2001. This law established Gacaca Courts at all administrative levels of Rwanda and in Kigali. It was mainly created to lessen the burden on normal courts and provide assistance in the justice system to run trials for those already in prison. The least severe cases, according to the terms of Organic Law No. 08/96 of 30, would be handled by these Gacaca Courts. With this law, the government began implementing a participatory justice system, known as Gacaca, to address the enormous backlog of cases. The Gacaca court system traditionally dealt with conflicts within communities, but it was adapted to deal with genocide crimes. Among the principal objectives of the courts were identification of the truth about what happened during the genocide, speeding up the process of trying genocide suspects, national unity and reconciliation, and demonstrating the capacity of the Rwandan people to resolve their own problems.

The Gacaca court system faced many controversies and challenges; they were accused of being puppets of the RPF-dominated government. The judges (known as Inyangamugayo, which means "those who detest dishonesty" in Kinyarwanda) who preside over the genocide trials were elected by the public. After election, the judges received training, but there was concern that the training was not adequate for serious legal questions or complex proceedings. Furthermore, many judges resigned after facing accusations of participating in the genocide; 27% of them were so accused. There was also a lack of defense counsel and protections for the accused, who were denied the right to appeal to ordinary courts. Most trials were open to the public, but there were issues with witness intimidation. The Gacaca courts did not try those responsible for massacres of Hutu civilians committed by members of the RPF, which controlled the Gacaca Court system.

On 18 June 2012, the Gacaca court system was officially closed after facing criticism. It is estimated that the Gacaca court system tried 1,958,634 cases during its lifetime and that 1,003,227 persons stood trial.

=== International Criminal Tribunal for Rwanda ===
Meanwhile, the UN established the International Criminal Tribunal for Rwanda (ICTR), based in Arusha, Tanzania. The UN Tribunal tried high-level members of the government and armed forces, while Rwanda prosecuted lower-level leaders and local people.

Since the ICTR was established as an ad hoc international jurisdiction, the ICTR was scheduled to close by the end of 2014, after it would complete trials by 2009 and appeals by 2010 or 2011. Initially, the U.N. Security Council established the ICTR in 1994 with an original mandate of four years without a fixed deadline and set on addressing the crimes committed during the Rwandan genocide. As the years passed, it became apparent that the ICTR would exist long past its original mandate. With the announcement of its closing, there was a concern over how residual issues would be handled, because "The nature of criminal judicial work ... is such that it never really ends." The ICTR officially closed on 31 December 2015, and its remaining functions were handed over to the Mechanism for International Criminal Tribunals.

=== Censorship ===
Article 38 of the Constitution of Rwanda 2003 guarantees "the freedom of expression and freedom of access to information where it does not prejudice public order, good morals, the protection of the youth and children, the right of every citizen to honour and dignity and protection of personal and family privacy". This has not guaranteed freedom of speech or expression given that the government has declared many forms of speech fall into the exceptions. Under these exceptions, longtime Rwandan president, Paul Kagame, asserted that any acknowledgment of the separate people was detrimental to the unification of post-genocide Rwanda and has created numerous laws to prevent Rwandans from promoting a "genocide ideology" and "divisionism". The law does not explicitly define such terms, nor does it state that one's beliefs must be spoken. For example, the law defines divisionism as "the use of any speech, written statement, or action that divides people, that is likely to spark conflicts among people, or that causes an uprising which might degenerate into strife among people based on discrimination". Fear of the possible ramifications from breaking these laws have caused a culture of self-censorship within the population. Both civilians and the press typically avoid anything that could be construed as critical of the government/military or promoting "divisionism".

Under the Rwandan constitution, "revisionism, negationism and trivialisation of genocide" are criminal offences. Hundreds of people have been tried and convicted for "genocide ideology", "revisionism", and other laws ostensibly related to the genocide. According to Amnesty International, of the 489 individuals convicted of "genocide revisionism and other related crimes" in 2009, five were sentenced to life imprisonment, five were sentenced to more than 20 years in jail, 99 were sentenced to 10–20 years in jail, 211 received a custodial sentence of 5–10 years, and the remaining 169 received jail terms of less than five years. Amnesty International has criticized the Rwandan government for using these laws to "criminalize legitimate dissent and criticism of the government". In 2010, Peter Erlinder, an American law professor and attorney, was arrested in Kigali and charged with genocide denial while serving as defense counsel for presidential candidate Victoire Ingabire.

=== Survivors ===
The number of Tutsi survivors of the genocide has been debated. Different figures between 150,000 and 309,368 have been offered. There are a number of organizations representing and supporting these survivors of the genocide. These include the Survivors Fund, IBUKA and AVEGA. The 2007 report on the living conditions of survivors conducted by the Ministry of Social Affairs in Rwanda reported the following situation of survivors in the country:

Survivors of the Rwandan genocide
Category	Number of survivors
Very vulnerable survivors	120,080
Shelterless	39,685
Orphans living in households headed by children	28,904
Widows	49,656
Disabled during the genocide	27,498
Children and youth with no access to school	15,438
Graduates from high school with no access to higher education	8,000

=== Lack of response by the international community ===
The magnitude of the crisis exposed significant flaws in the humanitarian response to complex emergencies. Recognizing its implications, the Danish Ministry of Foreign Affairs proposed an unprecedented Joint Evaluation of Emergency Assistance to Rwanda. One of the four studies that composed it analyzed the performance of the humanitarian system.

The study revelead key problems like the political vacuum of the international community to prevent and stop the genocide, and the use of funding for humanitarian aid as a substitute for political and military actions. It also suggested key operational recommendations to improve the quality of humanitarian responses in complex humanitarian emergencies, related to investment in crisis preparedness and early warning mechanisms, coordination mechanisms, technical standards, NGO performance, and overall accountability of the humanitarian system. These recommendations helped promote the adoption of the recenty created Code of Conduct for Disaster Relief, and the launch of the Sphere Project to improve effectiveness and accountability of humanitarian action.

Other initiatives were also born at this stage, as institutional responses to overcome the failures of the humanitarian system. These included the creation of the Active Learning Network for Accountability and Performance in Humanitarian Action (ALNAP), the founding of the promoters of the Core Humanitarian Standard, and the transformation of the UN Department of Humanitarian Affairs into the current OCHA, giving birth to modern humanitarianism.

== Media and popular culture ==
=== Art ===
Chilean-born artist Alfredo Jaar travelled to Rwanda in August 1994 to witness the aftermath of the genocide. Jaar, sensing an urgent need to raise public awareness, began his 6-year-long Rwanda Project upon returning home. In an early work, Rwanda, Rwanda (1994), Jaar mounted four hundred prints with "RWANDA" repeated in bold lettering on backlit displays in public locations throughout Malmö, Sweden. Other notable works include The Silence of Nduwayezu (1997), in which a photo—the eyes of a young boy who had witnessed the murder of both his parents—was printed onto one million slides, reflecting the estimated number of deaths throughout the genocide.

=== Books ===
Canadian Lieutenant-General Roméo Dallaire became the best-known eyewitness to the genocide after co-writing the book Shake Hands with the Devil: The Failure of Humanity in Rwanda (2003) describing his experiences with depression and post-traumatic stress disorder.

In March 2024, Dorcy Rugamba's memoir dedicated to his absent family and as a gift to his children, Hewa Rwanda, une lettre aux absents, was published by Éditions JC Lattès. It was published in English as Hewa Rwanda, Letter to the Absent.

=== Film ===
100 Days, directed by British director Nick Hughes and produced by Rwandan filmmaker Eric Kabera, was the first film shot in Rwanda after the genocide, as well as being the first feature film about the genocide. No professional actors were used, instead featuring both Tutsi and Hutu survivors of the genocide as the characters in a fictional narrative. It was shot on location at the actual scenes where acts of genocide occurred. Kabera has also made documentary films about the genocide.

The critically-acclaimed and multiple Academy Award-nominated film Hotel Rwanda (2004) is based on the experiences of Paul Rusesabagina, a Kigali hotelier at the Hôtel des Mille Collines who sheltered over a thousand refugees during the genocide. In 2005, Alison Des Forges wrote that 11 years after the genocide, films for popular audiences on the subject had increased the "widespread realization of the horror that had taken the lives of more than half a million Tutsi". In 2007, Charlie Beckett, Director of POLIS, said: "How many people saw the movie Hotel Rwanda? [It is] ironically the way that most people now relate to Rwanda."

In 2005, HBO released the made-for-television film Sometimes in April, starring Idris Elba as a moderate Hutu who struggles to find closure a decade after the genocide. The film intersperses between the events of 1994 and the ICTR proceedings in 2004 and was shot in Rwanda.

Roméo Dallaire's 2003 book was made into the film Shake Hands with the Devil, released in 2007.

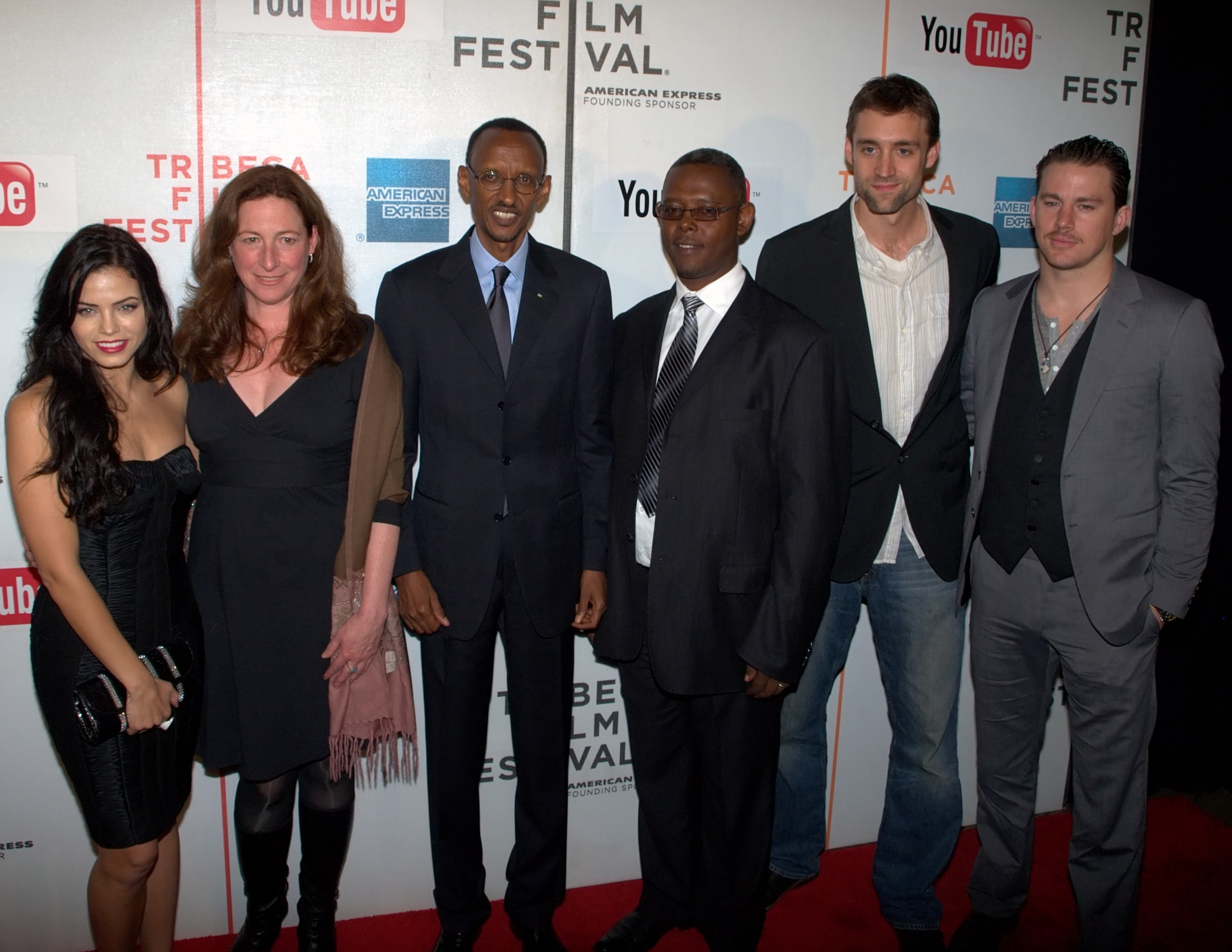
At the Earth Made of Glass premiere, Rwandan President Paul Kagame stands with, from left, Jenna Dewan, director Deborah Scranton, documentary subject Jean Pierre Sagahutu, producer Reid Carolin and executive producer Channing Tatum.

The independent documentary film Earth Made of Glass (2010), which addresses the personal and political costs of the genocide, focusing on Rwandan President Paul Kagame and genocide survivor Jean-Pierre Sagahutu, premiered at the 2010 Tribeca Film Festival.

Former journalist and United States Ambassador to the United Nations Samantha Power is interviewed about the Rwandan genocide in Watchers of the Sky (2014), a documentary by Edet Belzberg about genocide throughout history and its eventual inclusion in international law.

=== Theatre ===
In June 2024 Dorcy Rugamba presented a performance based on his book, Hewa Rwanda, in Braunschweig, Germany, as part of the Festival Theaterformen, and in October at the Théâtre des Bouffes du Nord in Paris. It was also presented at the Adelaide Festival in Adelaide, Australia, and several times as part of WOMADelaide, in March 2025.

=== Music ===
The song Papaoutai was released by Belgian-Rwandan singer Stromae in 2013, and was inspired by loss of the singer's father in the Rwandan genocide.

== See also ==
- History of Africa
- History of Burundi
- List of kings of Rwanda
- List of rulers of Rwanda
- List of presidents of Rwanda
- Politics of Rwanda
- Prime Minister of Rwanda
- Ruanda-Urundi
- Rwanda
- Kigali history and timeline

== Sources ==
- Adelman, Howard; Suhrke, Astri (1999). The Path of a Genocide: The Rwanda Crisis from Uganda to Zaire (illustrated ed.). Oxford: Transaction Publishers. ISBN 978-1-41-283820-7. Archived from the original on 2020-08-30.
- Appiah, Anthony; Gates, Henry Louis (2010). Encyclopedia of Africa, Volume 1 (illustrated ed.). Oxford: Oxford University Press. ISBN 978-0-19-533770-9. Archived from the original on 2017-03-23.
- Associated Press (I) (7 April 1981). "Guerrillas Ambush Troops In Uganda". Observer–Reporter. Washington, Penn. Archived from the original on 18 June 2020.
- Bamurangirwa, Patricia (2013). Rwanda Yesterday. Leicester: Troubador Publishing Ltd. ISBN 978-1-78306-041-2. Archived from the original on 2017-02-22.
- BBC News (I) (12 January 2010). "Hutus 'killed Rwanda President Juvenal Habyarimana'". Archived from the original on 1 June 2013.
- BBC News (IV) (10 January 2012). "Rwanda genocide: Kagame 'cleared of Habyarimana crash'". Archived from the original on 8 November 2018.
- BBC News (V) (17 September 2013). "Rwanda election: RPF wins parliamentary landslide". Archived from the original on 7 November 2018.
- BBC News (VI) (26 December 2018). "Rwanda genocide: Habyarimana plane shooting probe dropped". Archived from the original on 17 May 2020.
- Biles, Peter (4 October 1990). "Rwanda calls for aid to halt rebels". The Guardian. London. Archived from the original on 1 October 2018.
- Bonner, Raymond (7 September 1994). "Rwanda's Leaders Vow to Build a Multiparty State for Both Hutu and Tutsi". The New York Times. New York. Archived from the original on 30 March 2014.
- Bruguière, Jean-Louis (17 November 2006). "Report" (PDF). Paris Court of Serious Claims (in French). Archived from the original (PDF) on 16 December 2006.
- Carney, J.J. (2013). Rwanda Before the Genocide: Catholic Politics and Ethnic Discourse in the Late Colonial Era. Oxford: Oxford University Press. ISBN 978-0-19-998227-1. Archived from the original on 2017-02-22.
- Chrétien, Jean-Pierre (2003). The Great Lakes of Africa: Two Thousand Years of History. Cambridge, Mass.: MIT Press. ISBN 978-1-890951-34-4. Archived from the original on 2016-05-08.
- Cunningham, David E. (2011). Barriers to Peace in Civil War. Cambridge University Press. ISBN 9781139499408. Archived from the original on 2020-08-30.
- Dallaire, Roméo (2003). Shake Hands with the Devil: The Failure of Humanity in Rwanda. London: Arrow. ISBN 978-0-09-947893-5. Archived from the original on 2016-05-05.
- Dallaire, Roméo (2005). Shake Hands with the Devil: The Failure of Humanity in Rwanda. London: Arrow Books. ISBN 978-0-09-947893-5. Archived from the original on 1 July 2023.
- Dash, Leon (2 December 1983). "Many Rwandan Refugees Moving North in Uganda to Escape Attacks". Washington Post. Archived from the original on 1 October 2018.
- de Brouwer, Anne-Marie L. M. (2005). Supranational Criminal Prosecution of Sexual Violence: The ICC and the Practice of the ICTY and the ICTR. Antwerp and Oxford: Intersentia. ISBN 978-90-5095-533-1.
- "History" chapter of Des Forges, Alison (1999). Leave None to Tell the Story: Genocide in Rwanda. Human Rights Watch. ISBN 978-1-56432-171-8.
- Dorsey, Learthen (1994). Historical Dictionary of Rwanda. Metuchen, N.J.: Scarecrow Press. ISBN 978-0-8108-2820-9.
- Drumbl, Mark A. (2012). "'She makes me ashamed to be a woman': The Genocide Conviction of Pauline Nyiramasuhuko, 2011". Michigan Journal of International Law. 2013. SSRN 2155937.
- Elbe, Stefan (2002). "HIV/AIDS and the Changing Landscape of War in Africa" (PDF). International Security. 27 (2): 159–77. doi:10.1162/016228802760987851. JSTOR 3092146. S2CID 57560544. Archived from the original (PDF) on 19 October 2013.
- "Juvénal Habyarimana". Encyclopaedia Britannica. Archived from the original on 19 January 2019.
- Fassbender, Bardo (2011). Securing Human Rights?: Achievements and Challenges of the UN Security Council. Oxford: Oxford University Press. ISBN 978-0-19-964149-9. Archived from the original on 2020-04-22.
- Gourevitch, Philip (2000). We Wish To Inform You That Tomorrow We Will Be Killed With Our Families (Reprint ed.). London; New York: Picador. ISBN 978-0-330-37120-9. Archived from the original on 2017-04-14.
- Government of Rwanda (2009). "Chronology of Events Leading to Liberation". Official Website of the Government of Rwanda. Archived from the original on 7 March 2012.
- Guichaoua, André (2015). From War to Genocide: Criminal Politics in Rwanda, 1990–1994. University of Wisconsin Press. ISBN 9780299298203.
- Hayden, Robert M. (2000). "Rape and Rape Avoidance in Ethno-National Conflicts: Sexual Violence in Liminalized States". American Anthropologist. 102 (1): 27–41. doi:10.1525/aa.2000.102.1.27. JSTOR 683536.
- Henley, Jon (31 October 2007). "Scar tissue". The Guardian. London. Archived from the original on 1 September 2013.
- Human Rights Watch (27 February 1992). Rwanda: Talking peace and waging war, human rights since the October 1990 invasion (PDF). Vol. IV, Issue No. 3.
- Rwanda – The preventable genocide: The Report of International Panel of Eminent Personalities to Investigate the 1994 Genocide in Rwanda and Surrounding Events (IPEP) (PDF). Addis Ababa: Organisation of African Unity. 2000. Archived from the original (PDF) on 8 September 2015.
- ITMB Publishing. Rwanda & Burundi (Map) (4th Revised ed.). Richmond, B.C.: ITMB Publishing. ISBN 978-1-55341-382-0. Archived from the original on 2016-12-20.
- Jones, Bruce D. (2001). Peacemaking in Rwanda: The Dynamics of Failure. Lynne Rienner Publishers. ISBN 978-1-5558-7994-5. Archived from the original on 2016-12-24.
- Jones, Adam (2010). "Genocide and Mass Violence". In Laura J. Shepherd (ed.). Gender Matters in Global Politics. Routledge. pp. 127–47. ISBN 978-0-203-86494-4.
- King, David C. (2007). Rwanda (Cultures of the World). New York: Benchmark Books. ISBN 978-0-7614-2333-1. Archived from the original on 2016-06-17.
- Kinzer, Stephen (2008). A Thousand Hills: Rwanda's Rebirth and the Man Who Dreamed it (Hardcover ed.). Hoboken, N.J.: John Wiley & Sons. ISBN 978-0-470-12015-6. Archived from the original on 2014-06-10.
- Kroslak, Daniela (2007). The role of France in the Rwandan genocide. London: Hurst & Co. ISBN 978-1-85065-882-5. Archived from the original on 2020-08-30.
- Legum, Colin, ed. (1994). Africa Contemporary Record 1992–1994. Vol. XXIV. New York: Africana Publishing Company. ISBN 978-0841905627.
- Longman, Timothy (2017). Memory and Justice in Post-Genocide Rwanda. Cambridge University Press. ISBN 9781107678095. Archived from the original on 2020-08-30.
- Lorch, Donatella (25 April 1995). "Mood Grim at Camp in Rwanda". The New York Times. New York. Archived from the original on 10 August 2012.
- Lott, Gaia (July 2018). "On the margins of the Françafrique: Franco-Burundian and Franco-Rwandan bonds from an historical perspective". African Affairs. 117 (468): 347–369. doi:10.1093/afraf/ady013.
- McGreal, Chris (11 January 2007). "France's shame?". The Guardian. London. Archived from the original on 4 October 2018.
- McGreal, Chris (18 December 2008). "Rwanda's Himmler: the man behind the genocide". The Guardian. London. Archived from the original on 4 October 2018.
- McGreal, Chris (1 October 2010). "Delayed UN report links Rwanda to Congo genocide". The Guardian. London. Archived from the original on 30 August 2018.
- Mamdani, Mahmood (2002). When Victims Become Killers: Colonialism, Nativism, and the Genocide in Rwanda. Princeton, N.J.: Princeton University Press. ISBN 978-0-691-10280-1. Archived from the original on 2016-06-24.
- Mayersen, Deborah (2010). ""Race" relations in Rwanda: An historical perspective". University of Wollongong Research Online. Archived from the original on 27 November 2018.
- Melvern, Linda (2000). A people betrayed: the role of the West in Rwanda's genocide (8, illustrated, reprint ed.). London; New York: Zed Books. ISBN 978-1-85649-831-9. Archived from the original on 2014-06-29.
- Melvern, Linda (2004). Conspiracy to Murder: The Rwandan Genocide. London and New York, NY: Verso. ISBN 978-1-85984-588-2.
- Ministry of Public Service and Labour, Republic of Rwanda (MINFOTRA) (30 June 2015). "Official Gazette no Special bis of 30/06/2015" (PDF). Archived (PDF) from the original on 12 July 2018.
- Muhanguzi Kampe, Justus (2016). Eyes of a Journalist. Kampala: World of Inspiration. ISBN 9789970050185.
- National Assembly of France (15 December 1998). "Report of the Information Mission on Rwanda" (in French). Section 4: L'Attentat du 6 Avril 1994 Contre L'Avion du Président Juvénal Habyarimana. Archived from the original on 5 June 2011.
- Newbury, Catharine (1988). The Cohesion of Oppression: Clientship and Ethnicity in Rwanda, 1860–1960. New York: Columbia University Press. ISBN 978-0-231-06257-2. Archived from the original on 2017-02-22.
- Nganda, Ssemujju Ibrahim (6 August 2009). "WHO FOUGHT: Kagame helped Museveni crush internal NRA revolt". The Observer. Kampala. Archived from the original on 2014-03-20.
- Nowrojee, Binaifer (1996). Shattered Lives: Sexual Violence during the Rwandan Genocide and its Aftermath. New York: Human Rights Watch. ISBN 978-1-56432-208-1. Archived from the original on 18 December 2016.
- Park, Chang-Hwan (6 April 2020). "Revisiting the Rwandan Genocide". The Argus.
- Pottier, Johan (2002). Re-imagining Rwanda: Conflict, Survival and Disinformation in the Late Twentieth Century. Cambridge: Cambridge University Press. ISBN 978-0-521-52873-3.
- Prunier, Gérard (1995). The Rwanda Crisis, 1959–1994: History of a Genocide (Hardcover ed.). London: C. Hurst & Co. Publishers. ISBN 1-85065-243-0.
- Prunier, Gérard (1998). The Rwanda Crisis, 1959–1994: History of a Genocide (2nd ed.). London: C. Hurst & Co. Publishers. ISBN 978-1-85065-372-1.
- Prunier, Gérard (1999). The Rwanda Crisis: History of a Genocide (2nd ed.). Kampala: Fountain Publishers Limited. ISBN 978-9970-02-089-8. Archived from the original on 2014-04-16.
- Prunier, Gérard (2009). Africa's World War. Oxford: Oxford University Press. ISBN 978-0-19-537420-9.
- Public Broadcasting Service (PBS). "100 days of Slaughter: A Chronology of U.S./U.N. Actions". PBS. Archived from the original on 5 August 2007.
- Reyntjens, Filip (2013). Political Governance in Post-Genocide Rwanda. Cambridge: Cambridge University Press. ISBN 978-1-107-67879-8.
- Reyntjens, Filip (21 October 2014). "Rwanda's Untold Story. A reply to '38 scholars, scientists, researchers, journalists and historians'". African Arguments. Archived from the original on 25 July 2018.
- Radio France International (RFI) (10 April 2014). "Twenty years after genocide France and Rwanda give different versions of history". Archived from the original on 4 March 2016.
- Rucyahana, John (2007). The Bishop of Rwanda. Nashville, Tenn.: Thomas Nelson. ISBN 978-0-84-990052-5.
- Sabar, Ariel (27 March 2013). "A King With No Country". Washingtonian. Washington, D.C. Archived from the original on 18 July 2018.
- Shyaka, Anastase (1 July 2004). "The Rwandan Conflict: Origin, Development, Exit Strategies" (PDF). National Unity and Reconciliation Commission, Republic of Rwanda. Archived (PDF) from the original on 3 May 2019.
- Simpson (I), Chris (14 November 2000). "Kagame: Quiet soldier who runs Rwanda". BBC News. London. Archived from the original on 21 August 2017.
- Straus, Scott (2013). The Order of Genocide: Race, Power, and War in Rwanda. Cornell University Press. ISBN 978-0-8014-6714-1.
- Totten, Samuel; Parsons, William S (2009). Century of Genocide. New York and Londo: Routledge. ISBN 978-0-203-89043-1.
- Twagilimana, Aimable (2007). Historical Dictionary of Rwanda. Metuchen, N.J.: Scarecrow Press. ISBN 978-0-8108-6426-9. Archived from the original on 2020-08-30.
- United Nations (September 1996). "Rwanda-UNAMIR Background". Archived from the original on 23 October 2018.
- United States Holocaust Memorial Museum (6 January 2011). "Rwanda". Holocaust Encyclopedia. Archived from the original on 5 August 2011.
- Wallis, Andrew (2006). Silent Accomplice: The Untold Story of France's Role in the Rwandan Genocide. London: I.B.Tauris. ISBN 978-1-84511-247-9. Archived from the original on 2020-05-31.
- Wells, Mike; Fellows, Nick (2016). History for the IB Diploma Paper 1 Conflict and Intervention. Cambridge: Cambridge University Press. ISBN 978-1-1075-6096-3. Archived from the original on 2020-08-30.
- Wilkinson, Tracy (7 February 2008). "Spain indicts 40 Rwandan officers". Los Angeles Times. Los Angeles, Calif. Archived from the original on 28 December 2013.
