= Vision 2050 (Rwanda) =

Medium-term development programme in Rwanda

Vision 2050 is the Rwandan national development strategy, launched in December 2020 by President Paul Kagame and the country's Ministry of Finance and Economic Planning (MINECOFIN).

The programme, which follows the previous Vision 2020 20-year development plan which rebuilt Rwanda after years of Civil War and Genocide, aims to transform Rwanda into an Upper-Middle Income Country by 2035, and into a High-Income Country by 2050. Introducing the strategy, Kagame announced: "Vision 2020 was about what we had to do in order to survive and regain our dignity. But Vision 2050 has to be about the future we choose, because we can, and because we deserve it."

== Background ==
The Rwandan Patriotic Front (RPF) came to power in Rwanda after defeating the incumbent government in the Rwandan Civil War. The RPF's victory ended the 1994 Rwandan Genocide, known in Rwanda as the Genocide Against the Tutsi, during which 800,000-1,200,000 Rwandans lost their lives. In the late 1990s, president Paul Kagame and his government began actively planning methods to achieve national development. He launched a national consultation process and also sought the advice of experts from emerging nations including China, Singapore and Thailand. Following these consultations, and shortly after assuming the presidency, Kagame launched Vision 2020. The major purposes of the programme were to unite the Rwandan people and to transform Rwanda from a highly impoverished into a middle income country.

The Vision 2020 programme was mostly successful. A mid-term review in 2012 found that 26% of Vision 2020's original indicators had already been achieved. While also highlighting key areas for improvement, the review made several upward revisions, including revising the GDP per capita target from $900 to $1,240. No comprehensive official evaluation was made of the programme following its completion, but notable successes in healthcare, social care, education, governance, and economic growth were observed. Despite this, the strategy fell short of completing some of its ambitious targets, such as achieving Lower Middle Income status.

== Overview ==
Vision 2050's overarching goals were set out as follows:

1. Economic Growth and Prosperity

Rwanda aspires to become an upper-middle income country (UMIC) by 2035, and a highincome country (HIC) by 2050.

Specifically, this means realizing the following key economic targets:

- By 2035: GDP per capita of over USD 4,036; and
- By 2050: GDP per capita of over USD 12,476

2. High Quality and Standards of Life for Rwandans

- The aim is to achieve high quality and standards of living.
- Rwanda will build on the strong progress made in reducing poverty over the last two decades, reducing the poverty rate from 78% after 1994 to 38% in 2017, with the aim of eliminating poverty altogether.
- This will be achieved through ensuring all walks of society have increased opportunities to contribute to national development, including by growing investments in human capital and ensuring universal access to amenities, safety and security.
- All youth, women, men, and elderly people will contribute as actors of sustainable development, ensuring that no one is left behind in benefting from development.
- Vision 2050 is informed by the aspiration of Rwandans of leaving to Rwandan children a better world to live in.
- As such, growth and development will follow a sustainable path in terms of use and management of natural resources while building resilience to cope with climate change impacts.
- Rwandans aspiration for high quality of life will be further appreciated through the quality of the environment, both natural and built.
- These aspirations will continue to be embedded in Rwanda’s long term Green Growth and Climate Resilient Strategy (GGCRS) whose impact is intended to bring about mindset and developmental transformation in Rwandan society that is necessary to achieve the desired carbon-neutral and climate resilient economy.
- Efficient use of land across sectors will be guided by the National Land Use and Development Master Plan (2020-2050).
