= Michel-Ange Nzojibwami =

Burundian actor and director

- Born: Burundian
- Occupation(s): actor, director
- Known for: Shake Hands With the Devil

Michel-Ange Nzojibwami is a Burundian actor and director. He is best known internationally for his performance as Colonel Théoneste Bagosora in the film Shake Hands With the Devil, for which he garnered a Genie Award nomination for Best Supporting Actor at the 28th Genie Awards in 2008.

He has served as director of Tubiyage, a Burundian theatre company, and as vice-president of the Burundian film industry organization COPRODAC.

== Filmography ==
Year	Title	Role	Notes
2007	Shake Hands With the Devil	Colonel Bagosora	
