= André Ntagerura =

Rwandan politician

André Ntagerura (born 2 June 1950 - 18 June 2026) is a Rwandan politician. He is chiefly known for having been accused and acquitted of having a role in the Rwandan genocide.

Born in Rwanda of Hutu ethnicity, Ntagerura pursued formal education in Quebec, Canada.

Ntagerura held a number of portfolios in the government of Juvénal Habyarimana from 1977 to 1994. During the 1994 genocide, he was the Minister of Transport and Communications and a leading member of the MRND party which then held power. He was alleged to have coordinated the genocide conducted by Interahamwe militia through his party connections.

Ntagerura was detained with Colonel Théoneste Bagosora, in Yaoundé, Cameroon, and appeared before the International Criminal Tribunal for Rwanda, where he was acquitted of all charges on 25 February 2004.
