= Théoneste Bagosora =

Rwandan military officer, war criminal, and de facto leader (1941–2021)

- Undated photo of Bagosora

Chairman of the Crisis Committee
- In office 6 April 1994 – 19 July 1994
- President: Théodore Sindikubwabo
- Prime Minister: Jean Kambanda
- Preceded by: Position established
- Succeeded by: Position abolished Paul Kagame (as de facto leader of Rwanda)

Personal details
- Born: 16 August 1941 Giciye, Nyabihu District, Western Province, Rwanda-Urundi
- Died: 25 September 2021 (aged 80) Bamako, Mali
- Party: MRND
- Known for: Mastermind of the genocide against the Tutsis in Rwanda

Military service
- Branch/service: Rwandan Armed Forces
- Criminal information
- Status: Deceased
- Convictions: Genocide; Crimes against humanity War crimes
- Penalty: Life imprisonment; commuted to 35 years imprisonment

Details
- Victims: 500,000–800,000
- Date apprehended: 11 March 1996
- Military career
- Allegiance: Rwanda
- Branch: Rwandan Armed Forces (FAR)
- Service years: 1964–1994
- Rank: Colonel
- Conflicts: Rwandan Civil War

Théoneste Bagosora (16 August 1941 – 25 September 2021) was a Rwandan military officer. He was chiefly known for his key role in the 1994 Rwandan genocide for which he was sentenced to life imprisonment by the International Criminal Tribunal for Rwanda (ICTR). In 2011, the sentence was reduced to 35 years' imprisonment on appeal. He was due to be imprisoned until he was 89. According to René Lemarchand, Bagosora was "the chief organizer of the killings". On 25 September 2021, he died in a prison hospital in Mali, where he was being treated for heart issues.

== Early life and career ==
Bagosora was born in Giciye in what is now Nyabihu District, Western Province, Rwanda. In 1964 he graduated from the École des officiers (Officers' School) in Kigali with the rank of second lieutenant. In 1982, he graduated with a commendation from the Institut des hautes études de défense nationale in France. During his military career, he served as second-in-command of the École supérieure militaire (Superior Military School) in Kigali and as commander of Kanombe military camp.

On 29 April 1970, he was promoted to the rank of captain. He became a full colonel in October 1989. He was appointed to the position of directeur du cabinet (chief of staff) in the Ministry of Defence in June 1992. Despite officially retiring from the military on 23 September 1993, he retained this post until fleeing the country in July 1994.

== Role in the genocide ==
It seems that, in as much as there was a general organizer of the whole operation, this distinction has to go to Colonel Théoneste Bagosora.

— Gérard Prunier, The Rwanda Crisis: History of a Genocide, New York: Columbia University Press, 1995. ISBN 0-231-10408-1.

Bagosora was born in the same northern region as Juvénal Habyarimana, the president of Rwanda from 1973 to 1994. He was linked to le Clan de Madame, known later as the akazu, a group associated with Agathe Habyarimana, the president's wife, who was at the nexus of the Hutu Power ideology.

Although he was present at the negotiations of the Arusha Accords in August 1993, he never supported them. He is widely cited as saying, in the context of the Arusha Accords, that he was returning to Rwanda to "prepare for the apocalypse", but that is apocryphal. Luc Marchal, a Belgian officer, who served as Kigali sector commander in UNAMIR, reported that Bagosora told him that the only way to solve Rwanda's problems was to get rid of the Tutsi.

Bagosora was responsible for establishing paramilitary "self-defense" units, the Interahamwe, that would operate in every commune in the country. These groups were to act in concert with the local police, militias, and military authorities. Bagosora was also responsible for distributing arms and machetes throughout Rwanda. Between January 1993 and March 1994, Rwanda imported more than 500,000 machetes, twice the number imported in previous years.

At about 8:15 pm on the evening of 6 April 1994, President Habyarimana was flying back to Kigali after a meeting when his plane was struck by two missiles fired from the ground. The plane crashed, killing everyone on board. The position of the American and Rwandan governments is that the missiles were fired from the Kanombe barracks, which were controlled by the Presidential Guard, but that conclusion is disputed. News of the President's death was broadcast and the killings began.

After the assassination, Colonel Bagosora along with Colonel Rwagafilita gathered supporters and convened a meeting of a Crisis Committee. Roméo Dallaire, the UN commander was invited, and arrived to find the senior leadership of the Rwandan army. Dallaire rejected Bagosora's proposal of having the military take control of the political situation until they could hand it over to the politicians and he reminded him that Rwanda still had a government headed by Prime Minister Agathe Uwilingiyimana. Bagosora responded that she was incapable of governing the nation. A few hours later, Madame Agathe was murdered with her husband by members of the Presidential Guard and the army. After Bagosora's failed attempt to have the military take over the role of government, the group proceeded to pick a provisional government. The interim government was a multiparty group, but all came from the hardliner sections of their respective parties.

Massacres began all over the country. Many prominent Tutsis were killed right away, their names and addresses having been on lists. Radio Mille Collines broadcast incitements to genocide. Trucks began arriving to pick up scores of bodies. On the morning of 7 April, ten Belgian peacekeepers who had been guarding Prime Minister Agathe and who were witnesses to the government troops laying siege to her residence were disarmed and taken to Camp Kigali, approximately 200 metres from where Colonel Bagosora was holding a meeting of military officers. The peacekeepers were murdered over the course of several hours by military personnel. During his testimony, Colonel Bagosora admitted attending to the scene while the murders were in progress, although claiming he could do nothing to stop the killings. As anticipated, the death of the ten Belgian peacekeepers prompted the withdrawal of most peacekeeping troops from Rwanda, effectively clearing the way for slaughter.

Over the next 100 days, people were being killed at an astonishing rate. The number of dead in the genocide varies from 500,000 to more than 1,000,000 people, depending on the source.

Upon the interference of Tutsi army in response to the genocide, Bagosora fled into neighbouring Zaire. "Fed and protected in refugee camps supported by millions of dollars in international aid, the Hutu Power leaders were able to hold regular planning meetings and to recruit new members." With Bagosora actively involved, they rebuilt their military structures with the purpose of wiping out the Tutsi population.

=== ICTR trial ===
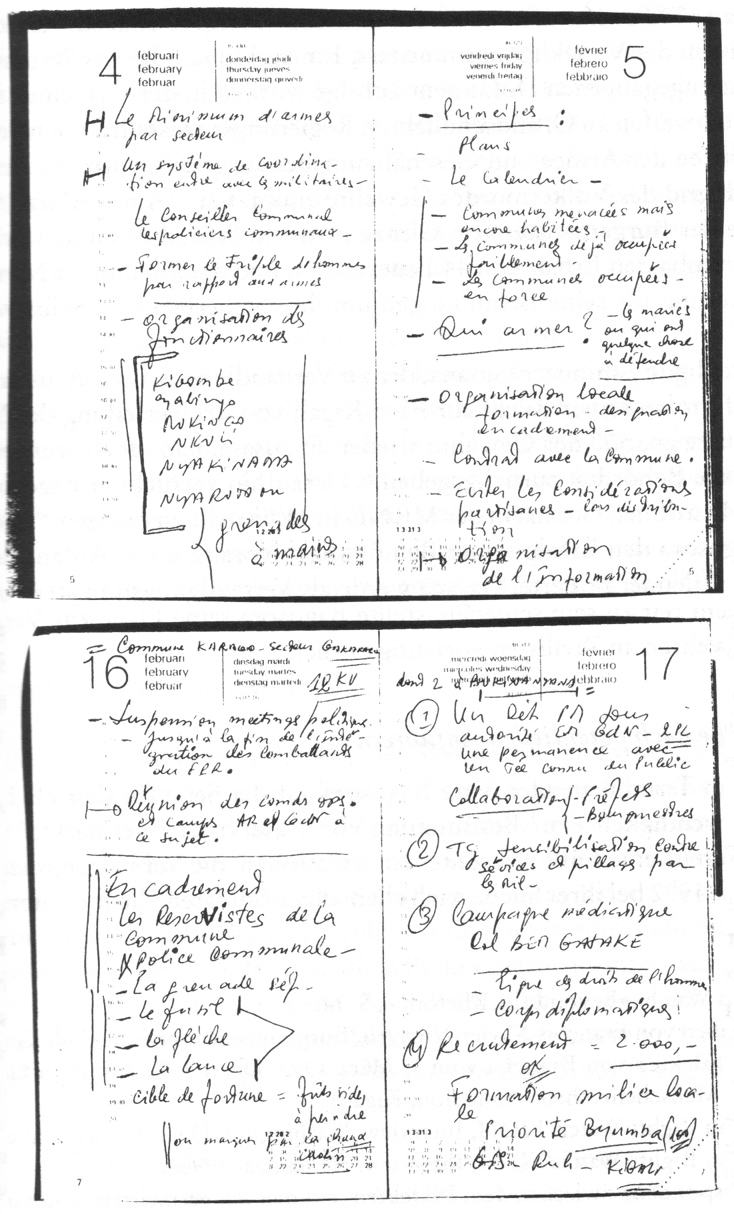
Pages of Théoneste Bagosora's diary of February 1993 showing elements of a program of "civil self-defence"

Bagosora later moved to Cameroon with several other Hutu Power leaders. It was there that he was detained with André Ntagerura in 1996. In 1997, he first appeared before the International Criminal Tribunal for Rwanda (ICTR) in Arusha, Tanzania, to face thirteen counts of eleven different international crimes, based on the laws of genocide, crimes against humanity, and war crimes. The joint trial with three other senior military officers charged as co-conspirators opened on 2 April 2002.

During his trial further evidence was submitted that in 1991 he and other co-accused helped to draft a document where they referred to the Tutsi ethnic group as the "principal enemy" which was widely distributed in the army. They were also accused of supporting the media outlets responsible for spreading hate messages and making lists of victims. The trial wrapped up on 1 June 2007, after five years, with Colonel Théoneste Bagosora still maintaining his innocence.

On 18 December 2008, the International Criminal Tribunal for Rwanda found Bagosora and two other senior Rwandan army officers, Major Aloys Ntabakuze and Colonel Anatole Nsengiyumva, guilty of genocide, crimes against humanity and war crimes and sentenced him to life imprisonment. In ruling that life imprisonment was the appropriate sentence for Bagosora the three trial judges concurred that "The toll of human suffering was immense as a result of crimes which could have only occurred with his orders and authorisation." The tribunal court stated that Bagosora had been "the highest authority in the Rwandan Defense Ministry, with authority over the military" in the aftermath of the assassination of President Habyarimana. The court ruled that Bagosora was responsible for the murders of Prime Minister Agathe Uwilingiyimana, the ten Belgian peacekeepers who had been guarding the Prime Minister at Camp Kigali, the president of the Constitutional Court Joseph Kavaruganda, and three major opposition leaders, Faustin Rucogoza, Frederic Nzamurambaho, and Landoald Ndasingwa. In addition, the court found Bagosora guilty of orchestrating the mass killings of Tutsis in Kigali and Gisenyi. However, the trial court held there was a reasonable doubt that events prior to 6 April could only be explained by Bagosora conspiring with others, so he was therefore acquitted on a charge of conspiracy to commit genocide prior to 7 April 1994.

In the end result at trial, Bagosora was convicted of 10 counts of eight different crimes, including genocide, two counts of murder (one for Rwandans and one for peacekeepers), extermination, rape, persecution, other inhumane acts, two counts of violence to life (one for Rwandans and one for peacekeepers) as well as outrages against personal dignity He was serving his sentence in the Koulikoro prison in Mali. On 1 April 2021, his request for parole was denied. Bagosora died five months later.

== In popular culture ==
In the 2005 film by HBO Sometimes in April, a historical drama about the 1994 Rwandan Genocide, Bagosora is portrayed by Abby Mukiibi Nkaaga.

In the 2007 film Shake Hands with the Devil, a dramatisation of Canadian military officer Roméo Dallaire's book about his time as commander of the United Nations Assistance Mission for Rwanda, Bagosora is portrayed by Burundian actor Michel-Ange Nzojibwami.
