= Vision 2020 (Rwanda) =

Government development program in Rwanda

Vision 2020 was a government development program in Rwanda, launched in 2000 by Rwandan president Paul Kagame.

Its main objective is transforming the country into a knowledge-based middle-income country, thereby reducing poverty, health problems and making the nation united and democratic.

== Overview ==
The programme contained a list of goals which the government aims to achieve before the year 2020:

- Good governance
- An efficient state
- Skilled human capital, including education, health and information technology
- A vibrant private sector
- A world-class physical infrastructure
- Modern agriculture and livestock

== History ==
In the late 1990s, president Paul Kagame and his government began actively planning methods to achieve national development. He launched a national consultation process and also sought the advice of experts from emerging nations including China, Singapore and Thailand. Following these consultations, and shortly after assuming the presidency, Kagame launched Vision 2020. The major purposes of the programme were to unite the Rwandan people and to transform Rwanda from a highly impoverished into a middle income country.

== Results ==
In 2011, the Ministry of Finance and Economic Planning (MINECOFIN) issued a report indicating the progress of the Vision 2020 goals. The report examined the stated goals of the programme and rated each one with a status of "on-track", "on-watch" or "off-track". Of 44 goals, it found that 66% were on-track, 11% were on-watch, and 22% were off-track. The major areas identified as off-track were population, poverty and the environment. By 2012, MINECOFIN's review found that 26% of Vision 2020's original indicators had already been achieved. While also highlighting key areas for improvement, the review made several upward revisions, including revising the GDP per capita target from $900 to $1,240. In the same year, an independent review of the strategy carried out by academics based in Belgium rated progress as "quite encouraging", mentioning development in the education and health sectors, as well as Kagame's fostering of a favourable business environment. The review also raised concerns about the policy of "maximum growth at any cost", suggesting that this was leading to a situation in which the rich prospered while the rural poor saw little benefit.

In November 2013, Kagame told This Is Africa "Our thinking is based on people. In national budgets, we focus on education, health, we look at technology, skills, innovation, creativity. We are always thinking about people, people, people."

In December 2020, Kagame and the Ministry of Finance and Economic Planning announced the project's successor: Vision 2050. As Kagame put it: "Vision 2020 was about what we had to do in order to survive and regain our dignity. But Vision 2050 has to be about the future we choose, because we can, and because we deserve it." Vision 2050 focuses around the pillars of Economic Growth and Prosperity and High Quality of Life and Standards of Life for Rwandans. Crucially, it aims for Rwanda to become an upper-middle income country by 2035, and a high-income country by 2050.
