= 2026 in Rwanda =

- Decades: 2000s; 2010s; 2020s
- See also: Other events of 2026; List of years in Rwanda

Events in the year 2026 in Rwanda.

== Incumbents ==
- President: Paul Kagame
- Prime minister: Édouard Ngirente

== Events ==
=== Ongoing ===
- Democratic Republic of the Congo–Rwanda tensions (2022–present)

=== January ===
- 27 January – Rwanda files a lawsuit against the United Kingdom in the Permanent Court of Arbitration, seeking £50 million ($68.8 million) in damages from the improper termination of the Rwanda asylum plan.

=== February ===
- 22 February – Two spectators at the Tour du Rwanda are killed after being struck by an out-of-control vehicle in Gabiro.

=== March ===
- 2 March – The U.S. Department of State imposes sanctions on the Rwandan Defence Force and multiple senior military officials, over support for M23 rebels in eastern DRC and violating the 2025 DRC–Rwanda peace agreement.
- 6 March – The United States imposes sanctions on multiple unidentified senior Rwandan officials on charges of "fueling instability" in the eastern DRC.

=== May ===
- 17 May – Rwanda closes the Goma-Gisenyi border crossing with the DRC amid the 2026 Ituri Province Ebola epidemic.
- 19 May – Rwanda signs a nuclear cooperation agreement with Russia.

=== June ===
- 1 June – Rwanda loses its lawsuit against the United Kingdom before the Permanent Court of Arbitration, which rejects Rwanda's claim seeking £60 million in compensation from the termination of the Rwanda asylum plan.
- 2 June –
  - The United States imposes sanctions on FDLR commander Gustave Kubwayo over his involvement in the ongoing DRC–Rwanda conflict.
  - L'Archive, a memorial in Paris commemorating the victims of the Rwandan genocide, is inaugurated by President Kagame and French President Emmanuel Macron.
- 26 June – The United States imposes sanctions on the Gasabo Gold Refinery, alleging involvement in a network smuggling minerals, including an estimated 60 kg (130 lb) of gold from rebel-held areas of the eastern DRC.

=== July ===
- 1 July – Prosecutors in Germany arrest a German–Rwandan national in Hesse on suspicion of complicity in the 1994 Rwandan genocide, including 25 counts of murder while serving as an assistant to the mayor of Kayove during the killings.

=== August ===
- 28 August – A court in the Netherlands sentences Eugene N., a Rwandan-born Dutch citizen, to life imprisonment for genocide and war crimes over his role in the massacre of 3,000 Tutsis in Mbazi during the Rwandan genocide in 1994.

=== September ===
- 24 September – Belgium and Rwanda renew relations after an 18-month break, following a meeting hosted by Qatar in Doha.

=== October ===
- 28 October – The United States Department of the Treasury imposes sanctions on Rwanda's Ministry of Defence and Zigama Credit and Savings Bank over their support for the M23 rebel campaign in the DRC.

== Holidays ==
- 1 January – New Year's Day
- 2 January – New Year's Holiday
- 1 February – National Heroes' Day
- 3 February – National Heroes' Day Holiday
- 30 March – Eid al-Fitr
- 31 March – Eid al-Fitr Holiday
- 7 April – Tutsi Genocide Memorial Day
- 18 April – Good Friday
- 21 April – Easter Monday
- 1 May – Labour Day
- 6 June – Eid al-Adha
- 1 July – Independence Day
- 4 July – Liberation Day
- 1 August – Umuganura
- 15 August – Assumption Day
- 25 December – Christmas Day
- 26 December – Boxing Day

== Deaths ==
- 16 January – François Bazaramba, 75, convicted war criminal.
- 7 May – Aimable Karasira, 48, singer, youtuber, and university lecturer.
- 16 May – Félicien Kabuga, 93, genocidaire and businessman.
- 30 July – Donatille Mukabalisa, 66, senator (2011–2013 and since 2024), speaker (2013–2024) and twice member of the Chamber of Deputies (2003–2011 and 2013-2024).
- 25 August – Tom Byabagamba, 59, military officer and presidential bodyguard.
- 3 October – Dafroza Gauthier, 72, political activist.
- 4 October – Callixte Mbarushimana, 63, génocidaire.
