= 1991 in Rwanda =

- Decades: 1970s; 1980s; 1990s; 2000s; 2010s
- See also: Other events of 1991; List of years in Rwanda

The following lists events that happened during 1991 in Rwanda.

== Incumbents ==
- President: Juvénal Habyarimana
