= List of mayors of Kigali =

The following is a list of mayors of Kigali, Rwanda.

- Francois Karera, 1975–1990
- Tharcisse Renzaho, 1990–1994
- Rose Kabuye, 1994–1997
- Protais Musoni, 1997–1999
- Marc Kabandana, 1999–2001
- Theoneste Mutsindashyaka, 2001–2006
- Aisa Kirabo Kacyira, 2006–2011
- Fidèle Ndayisaba, 2011–2016
- Monique Mukaruliza, 2016
- Pascal Nyamulinda, 2017 – May 2018
- Chantal Rwakazina, May 2018 – August 2019
- Pudence Rubingisa, August 2019 – December 2023
- Samuel Dusengiyumva, December 2023 – present

== See also ==
- Kigali history and timeline
