= Victor Kisob =

Cameroonian UN official

Deputy Executive Director, United Nations Human Settlements Programme
- Incumbent
- Assumed office October 2018
- Preceded by: Aisa Kirabo Kacyira
- Succeeded by: Michal Mlynár

Personal details
- Born: Victor Kisob; 1961 (age 64–65)
- Education: Stonyhurst College Saint John's University American University

Victor Kisob is the former Deputy Executive Director of the United Nations Human Settlements Programme UN-HABITAT at the level of UN Assistant Secretary-General. He was appointed as Deputy Executive Director on 25 July 2018 by the United Nations Secretary-General António Guterres.

== Background and Education ==
He was born in 1961 Cameroon. He holds a Bachelor of Science degree in Economics from the Saint John’s University in Minnesota, US, and a Master of Arts in Development Banking from the American University in Washington D.C.

== Career ==
Kisob has worked for the United Nations for over 30 years in economics, development finance, human resources, and executive management posts in Addis Ababa, Gaza, Jerusalem, Lusaka, Mogadishu, Nairobi, New York, and Vienna. During his tenure, he has seen service with the Economic Commission for Africa, the Department for Peacekeeping Operation, United Nations Office at Vienna, the Office of Human Resources Management, and the Executive Office of the Secretary-General within the UN Secretariat, as well as UNDP, UNRWA, and UNICEF.

Prior to his current appointment as Deputy Executive Director of UN-Habitat, he served as the Director of the Learning, Development and Human Resources Services Division in United Nations Office of Human Resources Management (OHRM) at the UN HQ in New York. Between 2016 and 2017 Kisob also served as Acting Assistant Secretary-General for Human Resources Management.
