= 2018 in Rwanda =

- Decades: 1990s; 2000s; 2010s; 2020s
- See also: Other events of 2018; List of years in Rwanda

Events in the year 2018 in Rwanda.

== Incumbents ==
- President: Paul Kagame
- Prime Minister: Édouard Ngirente

== Events ==
- March onwards – Flooding in Rwanda's hill country caused major landslides that killed more than 200 people.

== Deaths ==
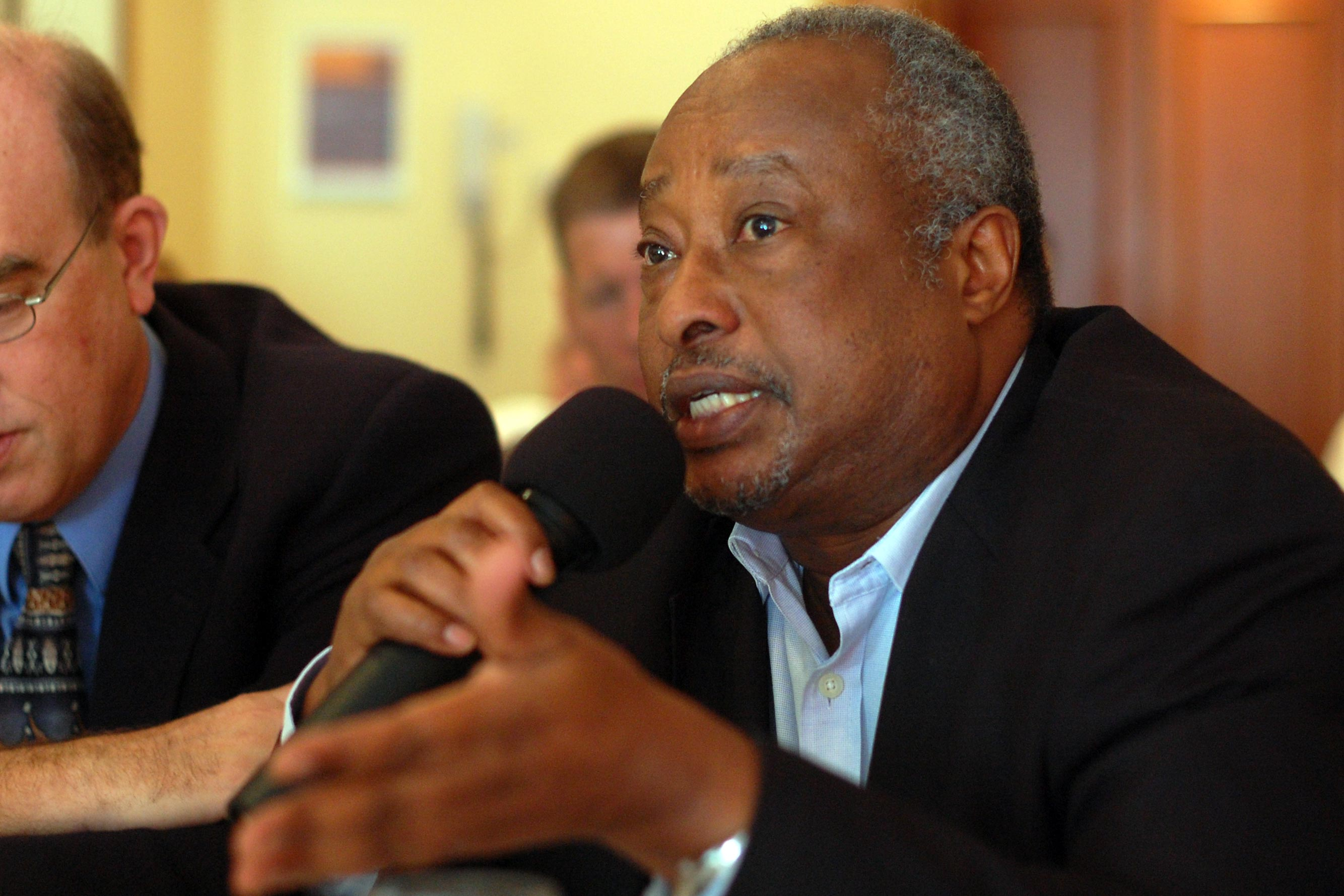
Patrick Mazimhaka

- 25 January – Patrick Mazimhaka, politician (b. 1948).
- 11 March – Jean Damascène Bimenyimana, Roman Catholic Bishop (b. 1953)
