= Pudence Rubingisa =

Rwandan politician

Governor of Eastern Province
- Incumbent
- Assumed office December 14, 2023
- Preceded by: Emmanuel K. Gasana

Mayor of Kigali
- In office August 17, 2019 – December 14, 2023
- Preceded by: Marie Chantal Rwakazina
- Succeeded by: Samuel Dusengiyumva

Personal details
- Occupation: Politician

Pudence Rubingisa is a Rwandan politician. On August 17, 2019, he was appointed the mayor of Kigali. He was appointed the governor of Eastern Province on December 14, 2023.

== Career ==
He served as Deputy Vice-Chancellor in charge of Administration and Finance at the University of Rwanda. In August 2017, while serving in that position, he was arrested, and investigated on the claim that he “made fraudulent payment of more than Rwf 1 billion ($1.09 million), to a contractor who had not done any work.” He was released on bail.

He won his first and only election for Mayor of Kigali with 71 votes beating Rose Rutera who got 22 votes. On August 17, 2019, he was inaugurated succeeding Marie Chantal Rwakazina after she was appointed the Rwandan ambassador to Switzerland.

Between November 16 and 18 of 2023, Kigali hosted the Africa New Cities Summit with Rubingisa being a keynote speaker.

On December 14, 2023, he was appointed Governor of Eastern Province succeeding Emmanuel Gasana.
