= 2025 in Rwanda =

- Decades: 2000s; 2010s; 2020s
- See also: Other events of 2025; List of years in Rwanda

Events in the year 2025 in Rwanda.

== Incumbents ==
- President: Paul Kagame
- Prime Minister: Édouard Ngirente

== Events ==
=== January ===
- 15 January – The Rwanda Mines, Petroleum and Gas Board announces the discovery of 13 oil reservoirs in Lake Kivu.
- 25 January – The Democratic Republic of the Congo cuts diplomatic relations with Rwanda and orders its diplomatic personnel to leave the country amid accusations by the DRC of Rwandan support for the M23 offensive.
- 27 January – Five people are killed in Gisenyi following an unspecified incident related to the Battle of Goma in neighboring DRC.

=== February ===
- 20 February – The United States imposes sanctions on minister for regional integration James Kabarebe for his role in the M23 offensive in the DRC.
- 25 February – The UK announces a partial suspension of its bilateral aid to Rwanda and sanctions over the Congo conflict.

=== March ===
- 4 March – Germany announces a suspension of new bilateral aid to Rwanda over its support for M23.
- 17 March – Rwanda severs diplomatic relations with Belgium and orders the expulsion of the latter's diplomats from the country after accusing Brussels of attempting to "sustain its neo-colonial delusions" amid the conflict in the DRC.

=== June ===
- 7 June – Rwanda announces its departure from the Economic Community of Central African States, citing the bloc's "instrumentalisation" by the DRC.
- 10 June – Seventy southern white rhinos are successfully relocated from South Africa to Rwanda’s Akagera National Park in the largest air-based translocation of its kind.
- 19 June – Opposition leader Victoire Ingabire is arrested on charges of plotting to incite public unrest.
- 27 June – The DRC and Rwanda sign a peace agreement to end the Kivu conflict following negotiations mediated by the United States.

=== July ===
- 28 July – A magnitude 5.1 earthquake with an epicenter in neighboring Burundi triggers a crowd crush that injures 14 people at a school in Gicumbi District.

=== August ===
- 4 August – The United States and Rwanda negotiate a deal that deports 250 migrants in the United States to Rwanda, in exchange for an unspecified grant.
- 8 August – Bayern Munich announces it will scale back “Visit Rwanda” branding, shifting its sponsorship to a three-year youth talent programme at the FC Bayern Academy in Kigali amid criticism over Rwanda’s support for M-23 rebels.
- 21 August – A French court dismisses a case against exiled former first lady Agathe Habyarimana accusing her of involvement in the Rwandan Genocide in 1994.

=== September ===
- 4-5 September – Aviation Africa 2025
- 21–28 September – 2025 UCI Road World Championships

=== December ===
- 4 December – The Democratic Republic of the Congo and Rwanda sign a peace agreement presided over by US president Donald Trump in Washington DC.

=== Ongoing ===
- Democratic Republic of the Congo–Rwanda tensions (2022–present)

== Holidays ==
- 1 January – New Year's Day
- 2 January – New Year's Holiday
- 1 February – National Heroes' Day
- 3 February – National Heroes' Day Holiday
- 30 March – Eid al-Fitr
- 31 March – Eid al-Fitr Holiday
- 7 April – Tutsi Genocide Memorial Day
- 18 April – Good Friday
- 21 April – Easter Monday
- 1 May – Labour Day
- 6 June – Eid al-Adha
- 1 July – Independence Day
- 4 July – Liberation Day
- 1 August – Umuganura
- 15 August – Assumption Day
- 25 December – Christmas Day
- 26 December – Boxing Day

== Deaths ==
- 9 October – Marie Immaculée Ingabire, 63, human rights activist.
