= 2011 in Rwanda =

- Decades: 1990s; 2000s; 2010s; 2020s
- See also: Other events of 2011; List of years in Rwanda

The following lists events that happened during 2011 in Rwanda.

== Events ==
- February 14 – More than 500 Rwandan textile workers began a strike.

== Incumbents ==
- President: Paul Kagame
- Prime Minister: Bernard Makuza (until 7 October), Pierre Habumuremyi (starting 7 October)
