= Timeline of Kigali =

The following is a timeline of the history of the city of Kigali, Rwanda.

== 20th century ==
- 1907 – Kigali founded by Europeans in German East Africa when German Richard Kandt "sets up an administrative residence."
- 1913 – Catholic Sainte-Famille Church built.
- 1919
  - Belgians in power.
  - Commissaire Royal du Gouvernement Belge headquartered in Kigali.
- 1922 – Kigali becomes part of Belgian colonial Ruanda-Urundi.
- 1959 – Population: 4,273 (estimate).
- 1962
  - Kigali becomes capital of independent Republic of Rwanda.
  - Population: 6,000 (approximate).
- 1964 – National Bank of Rwanda headquartered in city.
- 1966 – Bank of Kigali established.
- 1970 – Population: 54,403 (estimate).
- 1973 – Hôtel des Mille Collines in business.
- 1975
  - Lycée de Kigali (school) opens.
  - Francois Karera becomes mayor.
- 1976 – Roman Catholic Archdiocese of Kigali established; Vincent Nsengiyumva becomes archbishop.
- 1977 – Regional organization to develop Kagera River headquartered in Kigali.
- 1978 – Population: 116,227.
- 1980s – "Smelting plant" begins operating.
- 1986 – Amahoro Stadium opens.
- 1990
  - September: Catholic pope visits Kigali.
  - Tharcisse Renzaho becomes governor of Kigali prefecture.
- 1991 – Population: 234,274 city; 921,050 prefecture.
- 1993 – United Nations Assistance Mission for Rwanda headquartered in Kigali.
- 1994
  - 6 April: Presidents of Rwanda and Burundi assassinated.
  - 7 April: Massacre at Jesuit Centre Christus occurs at the start of the Rwandan genocide.
  - 9 April: Gikondo massacre occurs.
  - 23 May: "RPF army captures the Kigali Airport."
  - 4 July: The Rwandan Patriotic Army takes Kigali.
- 1995
  - New Times newspaper begins publication.
- 1996
  - Kigali Independent University founded.
  - Thaddée Ntihinyurwa becomes Catholic archbishop.

== 21st century ==
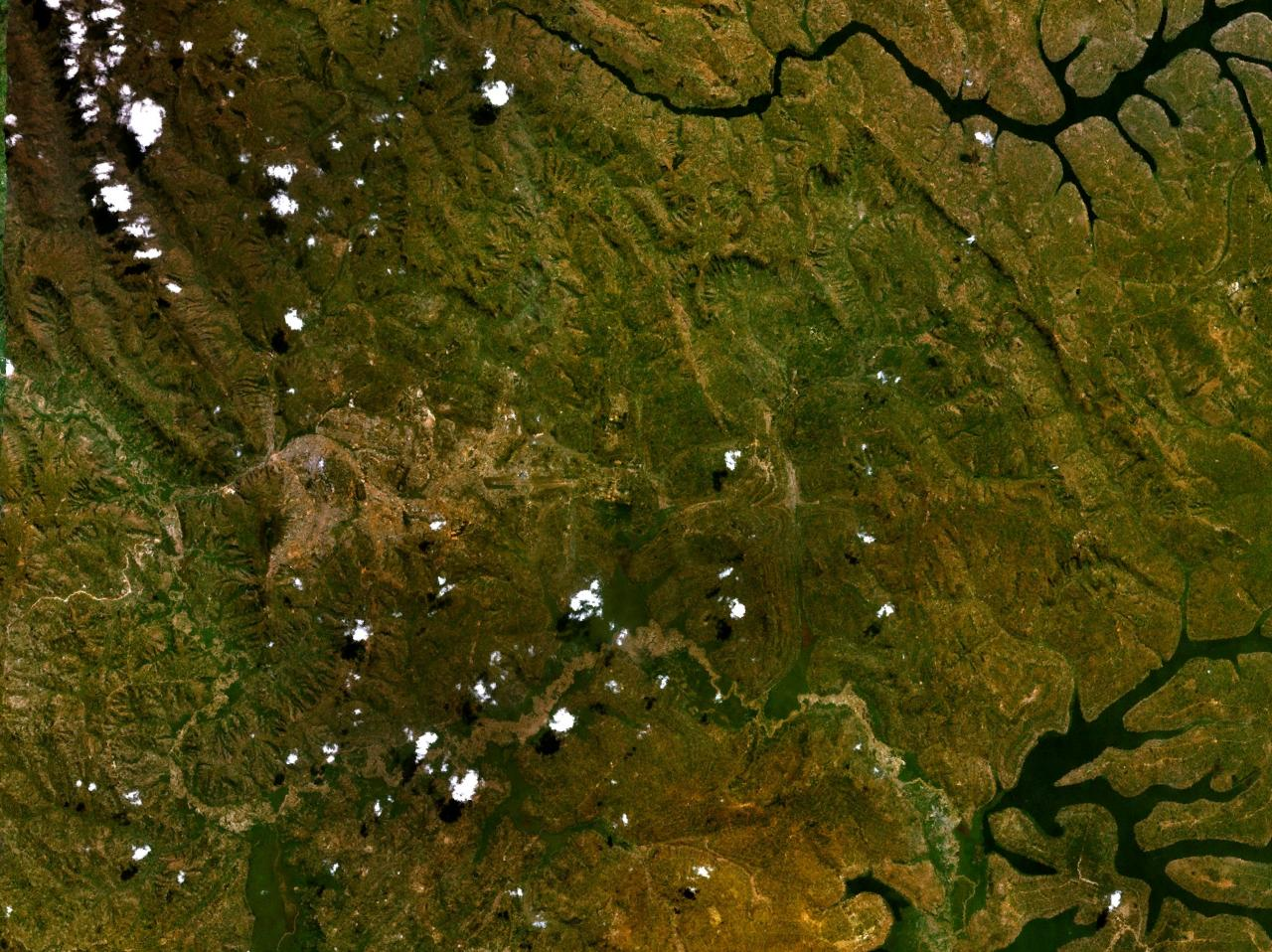
Satellite view of Kigali, circa 2005

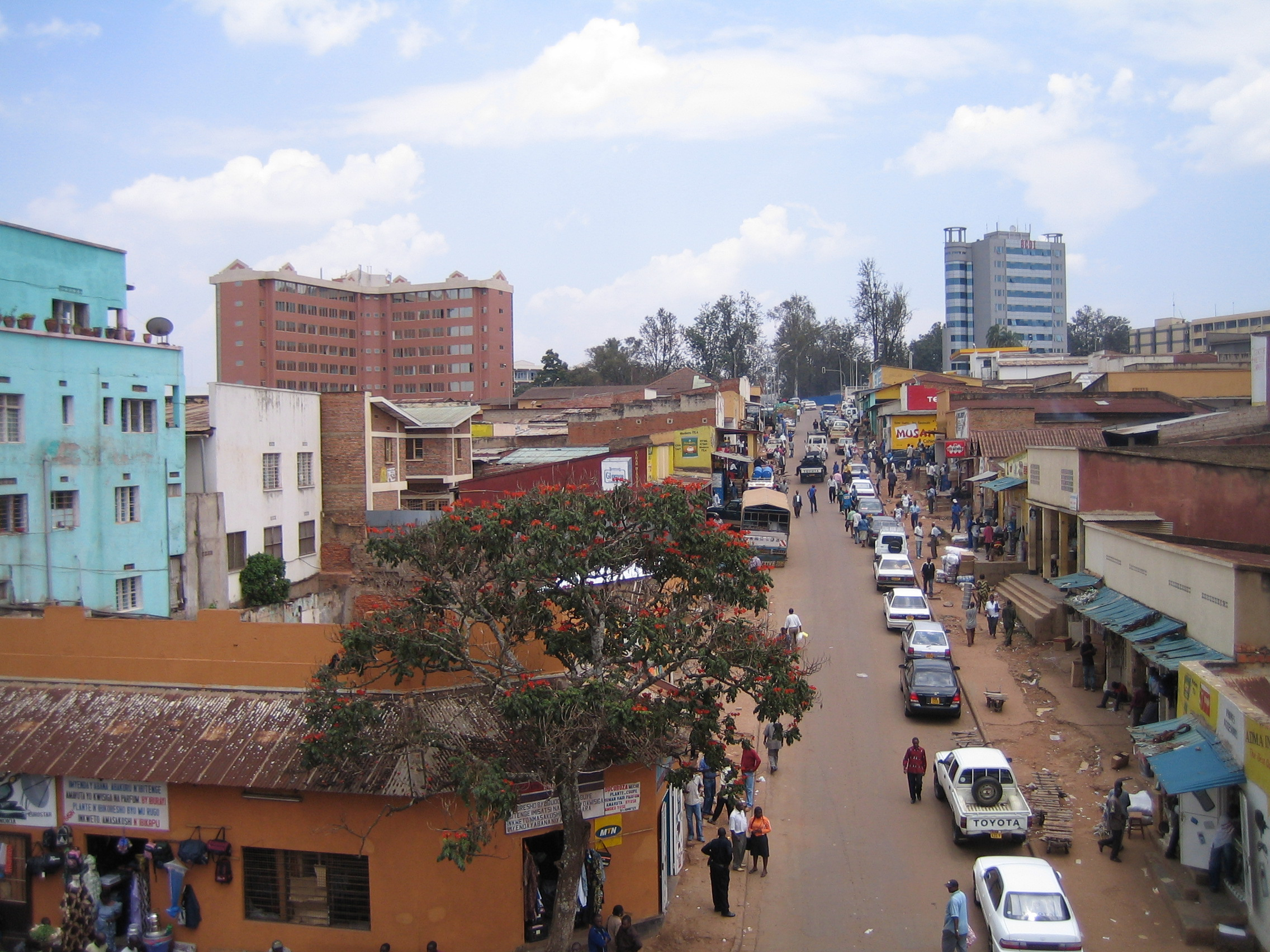
Street scene, Kigali, 2006

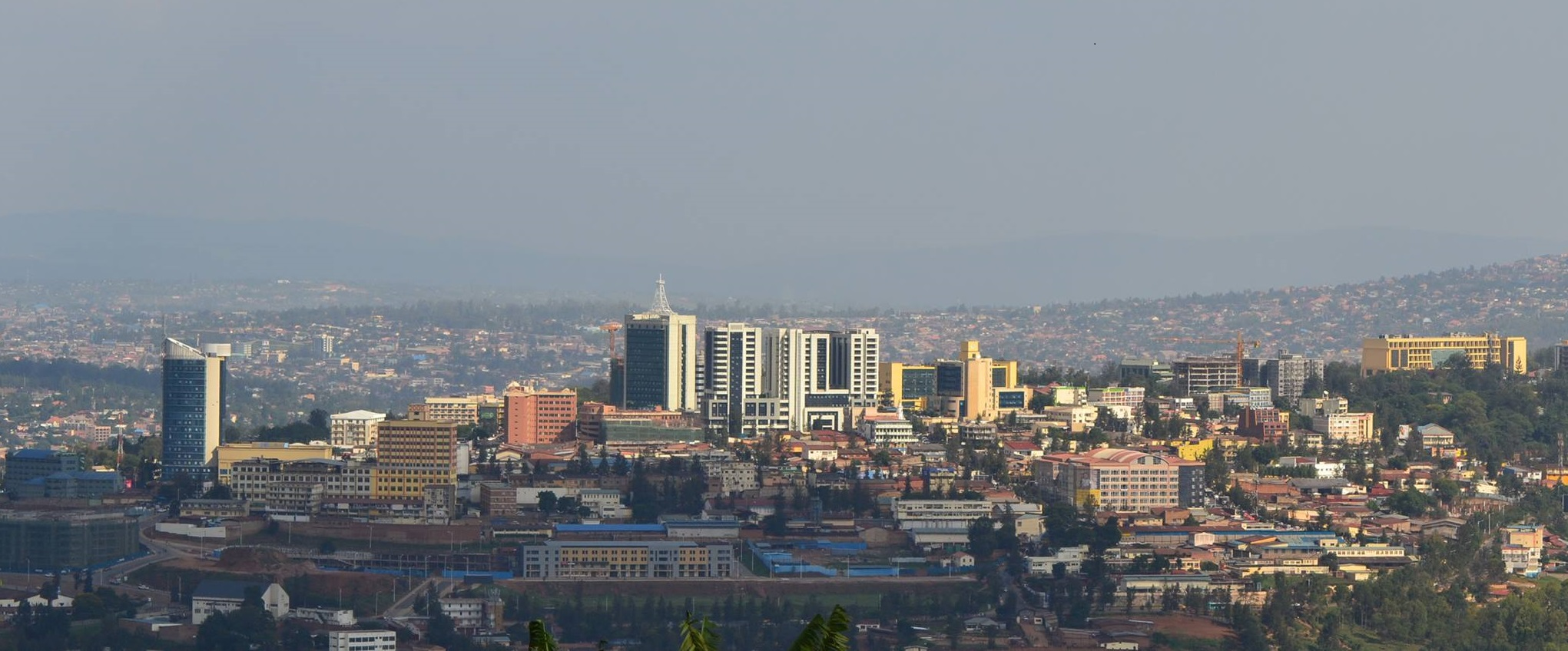
View of Kigali, 2015

- 2002 – Population: 603,049.
- 2003 – Kigalicity.gov.rw website launched (approximate date).
- 2004 – Kigali Genocide Memorial Centre opens.
- 2005 – National Institute of Statistics of Rwanda headquartered in city.
- 2006
  - Aisa Kirabo Kacyira becomes mayor (approximate date).
  - Kandt House Museum of Natural History established.
  - Some of Kigali-Ngali become part of Kigali City.
- 2007 – City centennial observed.
- 2008 – Rwanda Over The Counter Exchange established.
- 2010 – Kigali Special Economic Zone established.
- 2011
  - February: Fidèle Ndayisaba becomes mayor.
  - Kigali City Tower built.
  - Rwanda Stock Exchange headquartered in city.
- 2012 – Population: 1,132,686.
- 2013 – City of Kigali Master Plan created.
- 2014 – May: African Development Bank meets in Kigali.
- 2015
  - City of Kigali Town Hall built.
  - Makuza building constructed (approximate date).
- 2016
  - January–February: Part of 2016 African Nations Championship (football) played in Kigali.
  - February: Local election held; Monique Mukaruliza becomes mayor.
  - October: International environmental agreement signed in Kigali.
  - Kigali Convention Centre built.
- 2017 – February: Pascal Nyamulinda becomes mayor.
- 2023 – December Samuel Dusengiyumva becomes mayor.

== See also ==
- Kigali history
- List of mayors of Kigali
- Chronology of the Rwandan Genocide, 1994
- Timeline of Rwandan history

== Bibliography ==
- Peter Kagwanja; Mutuma Rutere (2003). "Kigali, Rwanda". In Paul Tiyambe Zeleza; Dickson Eyoh (eds.). Encyclopedia of Twentieth-Century African History. Routledge. ISBN 0-415-23479-4.
- Roman A. Cybriwsky (2013). "Kigali". Capital Cities around the World: An Encyclopedia of Geography, History, and Culture. ABC-CLIO. p. 140+. ISBN 978-1-61069-248-9.
- Tom Goodfellow and Alyson Smith (2013). "From Urban Catastrophe to 'Model' City? Politics, Security and Development in Post-conflict Kigali". Urban Studies. 50 (15): 3185–3202. Bibcode:2013UrbSt..50.3185G. doi:10.1177/0042098013487776. S2CID 154708992.
- "Kigali City Master Plan 2013" (PDF), Kigalicity.gov.rw, City of Kigali, 2014, archived from the original (PDF) on 15 October 2017
