= 2013 in Rwanda =

- Decades: 1990s; 2000s; 2010s; 2020s
- See also: Other events of 2013; List of years in Rwanda

The following lists events that happened during 2013 in Rwanda.

== Incumbents ==
- President: Paul Kagame
- Prime Minister: Pierre Habumuremyi

== Events ==
=== January ===
- January 1 - Rwanda joins the UN Security Council.

=== September ===
- September 16 - Paul Kagame along with the Rwandan Patriotic Front win the parliamentary election.
