= 2017 in Rwanda =

- Decades: 1990s; 2000s; 2010s; 2020s
- See also: Other events of 2017; List of years in Rwanda

The following lists events that happened during 2017 in Rwanda.

== Incumbents ==
- President: Paul Kagame
- Prime Minister: Anastase Murekezi (until August 30), Édouard Ngirente (starting August 30)

== Events ==
=== August ===
- 4 August - Voters go to the polls to vote for president in the election. Paul Kagame wins with 98.66% of the vote despite challenges from the opposition.

== Predicted and scheduled events ==
=== Date unknown ===
- 100% of the population will have access to clean water.
- 70% of the population will have access to electricity.
