= 2012 in Rwanda =

- Decades: 1990s; 2000s; 2010s; 2020s
- See also: Other events of 2012; List of years in Rwanda

The following lists events that happened during 2012 in the Republic of Rwanda.

== Incumbents ==
- President: Paul Kagame
- Prime Minister: Pierre Habumuremyi

== Events ==
=== January ===
- January 25 - 10 people are injured in a grenade attack in the south of Rwanda.

=== June ===
- June 18 - Rwanda's "gacaca courts", set up to try those responsible for playing a role in the Rwandan genocide, finish their work.

=== July ===
- July 15 - Rwanda and the Democratic Republic of the Congo agree an international border force to patrol their mutual border.
- July 29 - The Democratic Republic of the Congo accuses Rwanda of backing rebels hostile to the Congolese government.
