= 2016 in Rwanda =

- Decades: 1990s; 2000s; 2010s; 2020s
- See also: Other events of 2016; List of years in Rwanda

The following lists events that happened during 2016 in Rwanda.

== Incumbents ==
- President: Paul Kagame
- Prime Minister: Anastase Murekezi

== Predicted and scheduled events ==
=== January ===
- 16 January – 7 February - 2016 African Nations Championship

=== August ===
- 5–21 August - 3 athletes from Rwanda will compete in the 2016 Summer Olympics in Rio de Janeiro, Brazil

== Sports ==
- Rwanda at the 2016 Summer Olympics
