= 2015 in Rwanda =

- Decades: 1990s; 2000s; 2010s; 2020s
- See also: Other events of 2015; List of years in Rwanda

The following lists events that happened during 2015 in Rwanda.

== Incumbents ==
- President: Paul Kagame
- Prime Minister: Anastase Murekezi

== Events ==
=== January ===
- 23 January - Two Rwandan policemen charged in the murder of an anti-corruption activist are sentenced to 20 years in prison.

== Deaths ==
- 8 January - Jean-Claude Gasigwa, 31, Tennis player (Davis Cup team)
