= 2014 in Rwanda =

- Decades: 1990s; 2000s; 2010s; 2020s
- See also: Other events of 2014; List of years in Rwanda

The following lists events that happened during 2014 in Rwanda.

== Incumbents ==
- President: Paul Kagame
- Prime Minister: Pierre Habumuremyi (until 24 July), Anastase Murekezi (starting 24 July)

== Events ==
=== March ===
- March 7 - Rwanda and South Africa each expel the other's diplomats after armed men broke into an exiled Rwandan critic's home in Johannesburg.
- March 14 - A French court sentences former Rwandan army captain Pascal Simbikangwa to 25 years for his role in the 1994 Rwandan genocide.

== Sport ==
=== August ===
- August 17 - Rwandan international footballer Daddy Birori is found to be a Congolese player using a fraudulent passport. Rwanda is disqualified from the 2015 Africa Cup of Nations qualification competition as a result.
