= 2021 in Rwanda =

- Decades: 2000s; 2010s; 2020s
- See also: Other events of 2021; List of years in Rwanda

Events in the year 2021 in Rwanda.

== Incumbents ==
- President: Paul Kagame
- Prime Minister: Édouard Ngirente

== Events ==
Ongoing — COVID-19 pandemic in Rwanda

- 5 March – Rwanda is the first African nation to receive the Pfizer–BioNTech COVID-19 vaccine. 102,960 doses of Pfizer and 240,000 doses of Oxford–AstraZeneca COVID-19 vaccine have arrived through the U.N. COVAX program. Rwanda has had 19,000 cases and 265 deaths related to the virus.

=== Scheduled events ===
- 24 August to 5 September – Scheduled date for the AfroBasket 2021, to be hosted by Rwanda.

== Deaths ==
- February 22 – Seif Bamporiki, politician (Rwanda National Congress (RNC); killed during a robbery in South Africa

== See also ==
- International Conference on the Great Lakes Region
- COVID-19 pandemic in Africa
