= 2020 in Rwanda =

- Decades: 2000s; 2010s; 2020s
- See also: Other events of 2020; List of years in Rwanda

Events in the year 2020 in Rwanda.

== Incumbents ==
- President: Paul Kagame
- Prime Minister: Édouard Ngirente

== Events ==
- 14 March – The first case of COVID-19 in the country was confirmed.
- 31 May – The country confirmed its first COVID-19 death.
- 26 August – Rwandan and Burundian delegations, led by Brigadier General Vincent Nyakarundi and Colonel Ernest Musaba, respectively, met in Nemba to discuss longstanding security and trade issues. The meeting was facilitated by Colonel Leon Mahoungou of the Expanded Joint Verification Mechanism, an element of the International Conference on the Great Lakes Region.
- 21 December – Rwanda bolsters its security forces in the Central African Republic.

== Deaths ==
- 31 August – Édouard Karemera, 69, politician and convicted war criminal.

== See also ==
- 2020 in East Africa
- COVID-19 pandemic in Africa
