= 2022 in Rwanda =

- Decades: 2000s; 2010s; 2020s
- See also: Other events of 2022; List of years in Rwanda

Events in the year 2022 in Rwanda.

== Incumbents ==
- President: Paul Kagame
- Prime minister: Édouard Ngirente

== Events ==
- 13 April - Rwanda asylum plan

=== Scheduled ===
- 20–26 June: 2022 Commonwealth Heads of Government Meeting

=== Ongoing ===
- 2022 Democratic Republic of the Congo–Rwanda tensions
- COVID-19 pandemic in Rwanda
