= 1969 in Rwanda =

- Decades: 1950s; 1960s; 1970s; 1980s
- See also: Other events of 1969; List of years in Rwanda

The following lists events that happened during 1969 in Rwanda.

== Incumbents ==
- President: Grégoire Kayibanda

== Events ==
=== September ===
- September 29 - Rwandan general election, 1969
