= Timeline of Rwandan history =

This timeline of Rwandan history is a chronological list of major events related to the human inhabitants of Rwanda.

== 17th century ==
Year	Date	Event
17th century		Tutsi king Ruganzu Ndori comes to prominence.

== 19th century ==
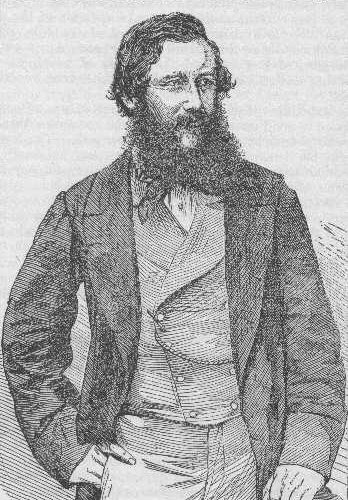
Explorer John Hanning Speke, the first European to visit the area

Year	Date	Event
1858		The area is visited by British explorer John Hanning Speke, the first European to do so.
1884	28 March	The Society for German Colonization is formed by Karl Peters in order to acquire German colonial territories in overseas countries. Peters signs treaties with several native chieftains on the mainland opposite Zanzibar.
1884	August	Rwanda becomes a German protectorate.
1885	2 April	The German East Africa Company is formed by Karl Peters to govern German East Africa.
1899		Rwanda is incorporated into German East Africa.

== 20th century ==
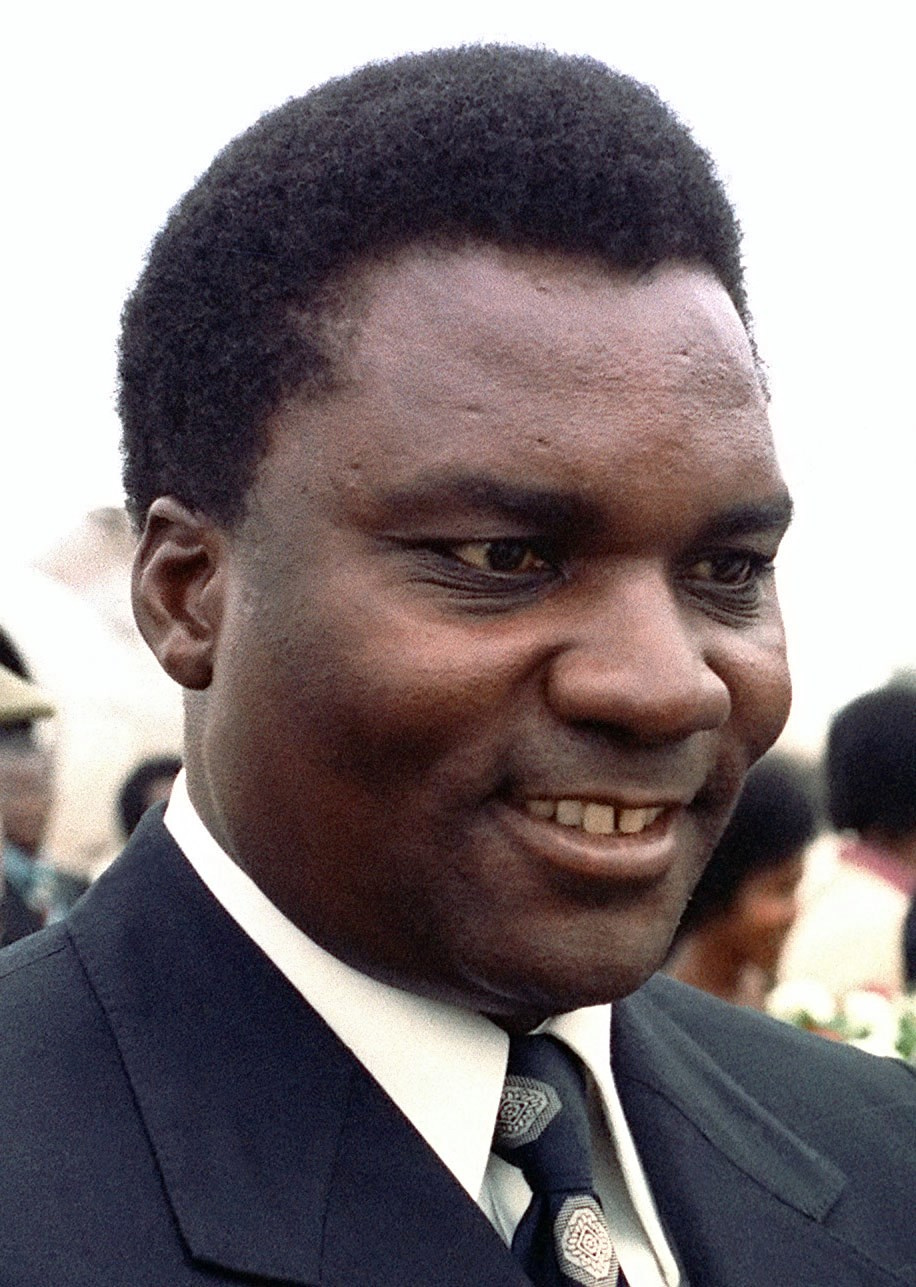
Third president Juvénal Habyarimana

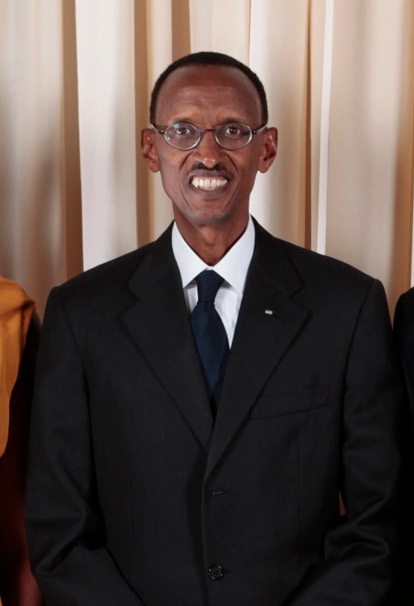
President of Rwanda Paul Kagame

Year	Date	Event
1901	23 February	A boundary is agreed between German East Africa and Nyasaland.
1916		Rwanda is occupied by Belgian forces.
1922	20 July	Rwanda-Urundi are joined as a League of Nations mandate, governed by Belgium.
1933		All citizens in Rwanda-Urundi are issued with an identity card defining their ethnicity.
1943		Famine affects the region.
1945		Rwanda-Urundi becomes a United Nations Trust Territory.
1957		The Hutu Manifesto is published.
1959	24 July	Mwami Mutara III dies.
1959	3 September	The Union Nationale Rwandaise (UNAR) party is formed.
1959	1 November	Politician Dominique Mbonyumutwa is beaten by members of UNAR, leading to a violent backlash that kills thousands of Tutsis.
1960		An election is held.
1961		Rwandans vote to abolish the Tutsi monarchy.
1961	28 January	Dominique Mbonyumutwa becomes provisional President of Rwanda.
1962	1 July	Belgium grants Rwanda independence.
1962	26 October	Grégoire Kayibanda becomes the first elected President of Rwanda.
1963		Following a Tutsi guerilla attack from Burundi, an anti-Tutsi backlash kills thousands.
1973	5 July	Grégoire Kayibanda is overthrown in a military coup d'état. Juvénal Habyarimana becomes the third President of Rwanda.
1985	26 December	American naturalist Dian Fossey is murdered in her Rwandan cabin.
1990	1 October	The Tutsi Rwandan Patriotic Front (RPF) makes an attack from Uganda, starting the Rwandan Civil War.
1993	4 August	The Arusha Accords are signed between President Habyarimana and leaders of the RPF in Arusha, Tanzania, ending the Rwandan Civil War.
1994	6 April	President Habyarimana and Burundian President Cyprien Ntaryamira are assassinated as their aircraft is shot down approaching Kigali. This incident sparks the Rwandan genocide.
1994	8 April	Théodore Sindikubwabo becomes interim President of Rwanda.
1994	3 July	The RPF takes control of Kigali.
1994	19 July	The RPF forms a provisional government and Pasteur Bizimungu becomes President of Rwanda.
1994	21 August	The RPF controls the whole of Rwanda.
1994	8 November	The International Criminal Tribunal for Rwanda is established.
2000	24 March	Paul Kagame is selected as interim President of Rwanda.
2000	22 April	Paul Kagame is sworn in as the fourth President of Rwanda.

== 21st century ==
Year	Date	Event
2006	January	"Rwanda's 12 provinces are replaced by a smaller number of regions with the aim of creating Decentralised administrative areas."
2007	6 April	Former president Pasteur Bizimungu is released from prison after three years of a fifteen-year sentence, pardoned by President Kagame.
2009		Rwanda becomes part of the Commonwealth of Nations.

== See also ==
- Timeline of Kigali
- Chronology of the Rwandan Genocide
- List of years in Rwanda

== Bibliography ==
- Institut für Afrika-Kunde; Rolf Hofmeier, eds. (1990). "Rwanda". Afrika Jahrbuch 1989 (in German). Germany: Leske + Budrich. doi:10.1007/978-3-322-92639-5. ISBN 978-3-8100-0831-2. OCLC 19093344. "Politik, Wirtschaft und Gesellschaft in Afrika südlich der Sahara"
- "Rwanda". Political Chronology of Africa. Political Chronologies of the World. Europa Publications. 2001. p. 344+. ISBN 0203409957.
- Jonas Ewald (2008). "Rwanda". In Andreas Mehler; et al. (eds.). Africa Yearbook: Politics, Economy and Society South of the Sahara in 2007. Vol. 4. Koninklijke Brill. pp. 347+. ISBN 978-9004168053. ISSN 1871-2525.
- Susan M. Thomson (2011). "Rwanda". In Andreas Mehler; et al. (eds.). Africa Yearbook: Politics, Economy and Society South of the Sahara in 2010. Vol. 7. Koninklijke Brill. pp. 359+. ISBN 9789004205567. ISSN 1871-2525.
- Susan Thomson (2013). "Rwanda". In Andreas Mehler; et al. (eds.). Africa Yearbook: Politics, Economy and Society South of the Sahara in 2012. Vol. 9. Koninklijke Brill. p. 351+. ISBN 9789004256002. ISSN 1871-2525.
- Aimable Twagilimana (2016). "Chronology". Historical Dictionary of Rwanda (2nd ed.). Rowman & Littlefield. ISBN 978-1-4422-5591-3.
