= 1968 in Rwanda =

- Decades: 1950s; 1960s; 1970s; 1980s
- See also: Other events of 1968; List of years in Rwanda

The following lists events that happened during 1968 in Rwanda.

== Incumbents ==
- President: Grégoire Kayibanda

== Events ==
- 21 March — Rwanda signs the International Coffee Agreement of 1968.
