= 2024 in Rwanda =

- Decades: 2000s; 2010s; 2020s
- See also: Other events of 2024; List of years in Rwanda

Events in the year 2024 in Rwanda.

== Incumbents ==
- President: Paul Kagame
- Prime minister: Édouard Ngirente

== Events ==
=== January ===
- 16 January – A Congolese soldier is killed and two others are arrested by the Rwandan Army in a cross-border shooting incident in Rubavu District.

=== February ===
- 19 February – Rwanda rejects the United States’ calls to withdraw troops and missile systems from the eastern Democratic Republic of the Congo, citing threats from an alleged Congolese military build-up near the border.

=== June ===
- 23 June – A crowd crush at an electoral rally attended by President Paul Kagame in Rubavu leaves one person dead and 37 others injured.

=== July ===
- 6 July – UK Prime Minister Keir Starmer announces the discontinuing of the Safety of Rwanda (Asylum and Immigration) Act 2024 enacted by his predecessor Rishi Sunak, under which some asylum-seekers trying to enter the UK would have been deported to Rwanda.
- 8 July – A United Nations report reveals that between 3,000 and 4,000 Rwandan soldiers are fighting alongside M23 rebels in the Democratic Republic of the Congo.
- 15 July – 2024 Rwandan general election: President Paul Kagame wins a fourth term in office while his Rwandan Patriotic Front and its allies retain their majority in the Chamber of Deputies.
- 30 July – Angolan President João Lourenço announces that the Democratic Republic of the Congo and Rwanda have agreed to a ceasefire following Angola-mediated talks. However, the ceasefire collapses before it formally begins on 4 August amid advances by M23 rebels in the DRC.

=== August ===
- 11 August – President Kagame is inaugurated for a fourth term.

=== September ===
- 27 September–6 October – At least 42 cases and 12 deaths are reported in an outbreak of Marburg virus in six districts.

=== October ===
- 30 October – A court in France sentences doctor Eugène Rwamucyo to 27 years imprisonment for his participation in the Rwandan Genocide in Butare Province.

=== November ===
- 27 November – Rwanda extradites Salman Khan to India, after the Indian government submitted an extradition request through Interpol. Salman Khan is accused of having links to Lashkar-e-Taiba, which the Indian government classifies as a terrorist group.

=== December ===
- 20 December – The Rwanda Marburg virus disease outbreak is declared over by the World Health Organization and the Rwandan government after no new cases are reported in the past 42 days.

=== Ongoing ===
- Democratic Republic of the Congo–Rwanda tensions (2022–present)
