= 2019 in Rwanda =

- Decades: 1990s; 2000s; 2010s; 2020s
- See also: Other events of 2019; List of years in Rwanda

Events of 2019 in Rwanda.

== Incumbents ==
- President: Paul Kagame
- Prime Minister: Édouard Ngirente

== Events ==
- 24 February - the 2019 Tour du Rwanda begins.
- The Rwandan government added menstrual pads to the list of VAT-exempted goods in an effort to make pads more affordable.
