= Tom Byabagamba =

Rwandan colonel (1967–2026)

- Born: 1967
- Died: 25 August 2026 (aged 59)
- Occupations: Colonel of the Rwanda Defense Force and head of the Presidential Guard Unit

Tom Byabagamba (1967 – 25 August 2026) was a Rwandan military officer and presidential bodyguard. He was a colonel of the Rwanda Defense Force and head of the Presidential Guard unit. Byabagamba was arrested and charged with inciting insurrection and tarnishing the government's image. Initially sentenced to 21 years imprisonment, he was supposed to serve 15 years after the Court of Appeal in Kigali reduced his sentence while upholding his conviction in 2019. The court also stripped Byabagamba of his rank.

== Background ==
Byabagamba was a decorated former military officer of the Rwandan Defense Force. He worked in the personal protection detail of President Paul Kagame from 1990 to 2010. In 2003, he was appointed head of the Republican Guard and was personally responsible for the President's security.

Byabagamba's brother, David Himbara, is a former economic adviser to President Kagame. He fled the country after observing the President's abusive behavior towards both allies and dissidents. After Himbara left, Kagame ordered Byabagamba to bring his brother back to Rwanda, and when he refused to intervene, Byabagamba lost his position as Commander of the Republican Guard.

== 2014 arrest and sentence ==
Byabagamba was arrested on 23 August 2014. The prosecution claimed that he had alleged Rwandan state involvement in several murders. They also accused him of alleging the innocence of convicted terrorist and former presidential bodyguard Joel Mutabazi and of criticizing increased Rwandan taxes on Tanzanian trucks.

On 5 January 2016, he was tried jointly in the Kanombe Military High Court with his brother-in-law Brigadier-General (rtd) Frank Rusagara, as well as Rusagara's driver, retired Sergeant François Kabayiza. On 31 March 2016, the court found Byabagamba guilty of all charges against him and sentenced him to 21 years imprisonment.

In December 2019, the Court of Appeal in Kigali upheld his conviction while reducing his sentence to 15 years. The Court also stripped Byabagamba of his rank. During the appeal, he told the court that he was subject to solitary confinement and close surveillance by cameras.

Byabagamba's arrest was part of a series of arrests against former members of Rwanda's ruling party, the Rwandan Patriotic Front, who have been critical of the government.

== International response ==
In July 2017, human rights focused non-profit Freedom Now submitted a petition to the UN Working Group on Arbitrary Detention on behalf of Rusagara, Byabagamba, and Kabayiza. In December 2017, the Working Group determined that their detention was arbitrary and violated international law. In February 2018, the Rwandan government denied the allegations and claimed it was not aware of the UN Working Group's communications.

In November 2017, Amnesty International submitted a report to the African Commission on Human and Peoples' Rights which stated that "judges have failed to adequately address allegations of torture during interrogation” in the trial of Byabagamba.

On 4 December 2018, Kate Barth, then Legal Director at Freedom Now, highlighted the case while testifying before the U.S. House of Representatives’ Tom Lantos Human Rights Commission. As well, Freedom Now submitted a report detailing the case to the Office of the United Nations High Commissioner for Human Rights. This report was delivered on 19 March 2020, in advance of Rwanda's Universal Period Review conducted by the UN in 2021.

Lewis Mudge, Central Africa Director of Human Rights Watch, condemned the arrest and stated: "Serious allegations of torture and witness tampering emerged during the flawed trial in 2016. The court of appeals had an opportunity to investigate these allegations and hold those responsible to account, but instead they doubled down on the decision to stamp out criticism of government policy and action.”

On 4 November 2019, six British legislators sent a letter to President Paul Kagame which conveyed concern over the ongoing detention of Rusagara and Byabagamba. They stated: "We commend Rwanda’s progress over the last three decades, particularly the strides it has made in creating a more inclusive society that has drawn in marginalized populations. However, we are troubled that Rwanda has imposed disproportionate sentences on individuals who are suffering from serious health issues in poor prison conditions”. In response, Rwanda justice minister Johnston Busingye stated "It would be inappropriate for the Executive to comment on any pending case, seek to influence the outcome or intervene as proposed in your letter”.

== Death ==
Byabagamba died on 25 August 2026, at the age of 59. His death was disclosed by his elder brother, David Himbara.

Byabagamba was arrested in 2014 together with Frank Rusagara, his brother-in-law and a retired brigadier general. The two were charged with offences including spreading rumours and tarnishing the image of the country and the government. Byabagamba rejected the accusations throughout the proceedings, stating that the case against him had been fabricated. Human rights organisations criticised both prosecutions, describing them as part of a broader pattern of state repression in Rwanda.

His brother, the academic David Himbara, told the BBC Great Lakes service that the family did not know the cause of his death, adding that relatives had been refused access to him throughout his imprisonment.

== See also ==
- Arrest of Frank Rusagara
- Human rights in Rwanda
- Rwandan genocide
- Rwandan Civil War
- Rwanda National Congress
- Paul Kagame
