= Timeline of the Rwandan genocide =

The following is a partial chronology of significant events surrounding the 1994 Rwandan genocide.

1994

April 6

- Rwandan president Juvénal Habyarimana is assassinated when a rocket propelled grenade strikes the plane carrying him and Burundi president Cyprien Ntaryamira, following negotiations related to the Arusha Accords. Ethnically motivated killings of Tutsis by radical Hutus begin.

April 7

- Roadblocks are established by the Rwandan Armed Forces (FAR) and the Interahamwe. Members of these and other Hutu Power organizations proceed to start a door to door campaign, beginning in the north of the country and spreading south, targeting Tutsi Rwandans as well as moderate Hutus. Prime Minister Agathe Uwilingiyimana, along with thousands of others, is murdered.

April 8

- The Rwandan Patriotic Front, led by future Rwandan president Paul Kagame, launches a significant offensive aimed at ending the genocide and rescuing soldiers trapped in Kigali. Outnumbered, they followed a strategy of striking government compounds but allowing for retreat, avoiding all-out warfare.

April 21

- Following the execution of ten Belgian soldiers who had been guarding Uwilingiyimana, the U.N. reduces its force from 2,500 to 250 troops.

April 28-April 30

- Massive numbers of Rwandans, primarily Hutus, flee the advance of the RPF, many fearing prosecution for their crimes. The resulting crisis, in which hundreds of thousands entered Burundi, Tanzania, and eastern Democratic Republic of the Congo, is widely broadcast around the world, and many misinterpret the refugees as victims of the genocide.
- Meanwhile, the United Nations debates the crisis in Rwanda, cautiously avoiding use of the term 'genocide', lest they be compelled into fuller action.

May 17

- The U.N. agrees to send in 6,800 policemen, empowered to defend civilians, while the killings of Tutsis continues.

June 22

- Opération Turquoise is established, which serves to protect Hutu Genocidaires and stall the advance of the RPF. The agreed upon U.N. police force, meanwhile, has not yet arrived.

July

- As the Hutu government flees into then-Zaire, the RPF captures Kigali. A cholera epidemic in Zaire kills thousands of Hutu refugees. Sporadic killings persist.

August

- An agreement to establish a framework for trying major war criminals, to become the International Criminal Tribunal for Rwanda, is agreed upon.

== See also ==
- Initial events of the Rwandan Genocide
- Timeline of Rwandan history
- Timeline of Kigali
