= 1963 in Rwanda =

- Decades: 1950s; 1960s; 1970s; 1980s
- See also: Other events of 1963; List of years in Rwanda

The following lists events that happened during 1963 in Rwanda.

== Incumbents ==
- President: Grégoire Kayibanda
