= Marie Immaculée Ingabire =

Rwandan human rights activist (died 2025)

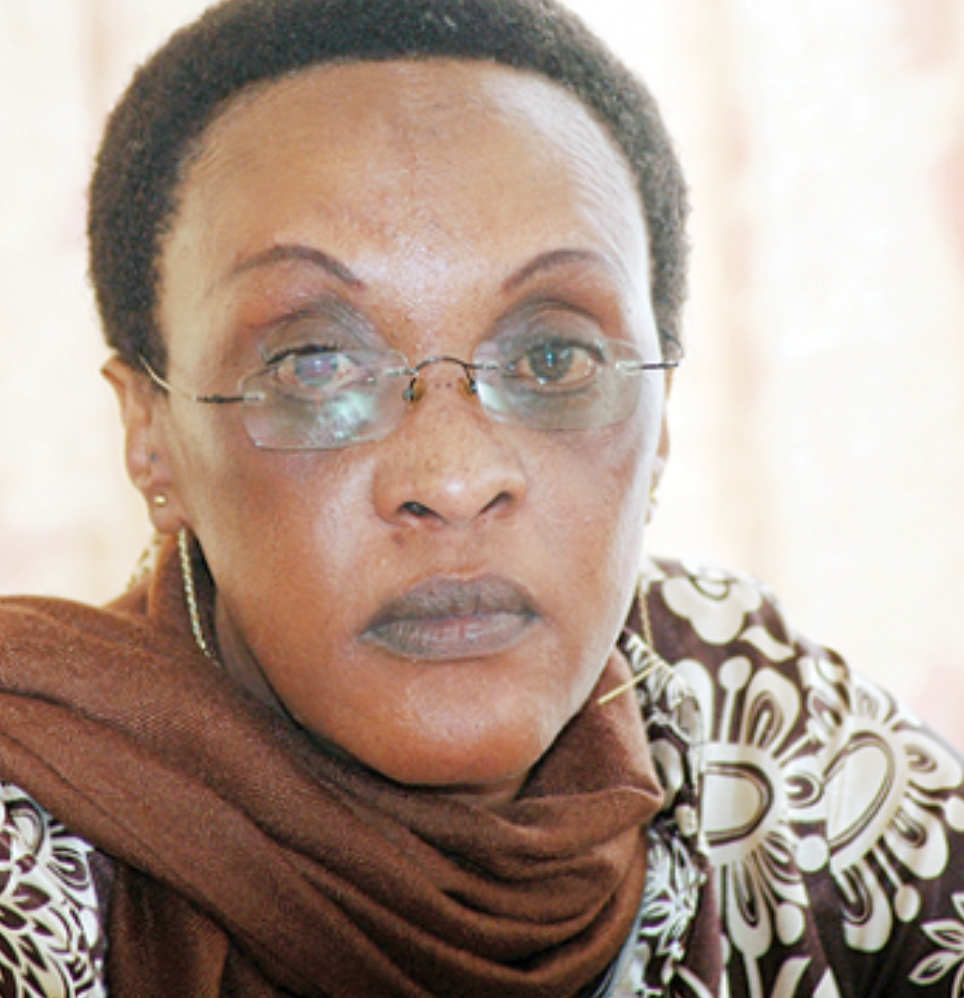
Ingabire in 2021

Marie Immaculée Ingabire (1961 or 1962 – 9 October 2025) was a Rwandan feminist and human rights activist, a dedicated gender and social justice advocate who spent all her career in advancing women's rights in Rwanda and in the Region. She led Rwandan delegations and represented Rwanda in different high-level forums and movements such as the Fourth World Conference on Women 1995 in Beijing and the International Conference on the Great Lakes Region, where she was the chairperson of the Regional Women Forum.

Ingabire was at the forefront of establishing many women led organisations such as PROFEMME TWESE HAMWE, HAGURUKA, and Rwanda Women Network and was the chairperson of the Rwandan National chapter of Transparency International where she was working in the prevention and reporting corruption.

== Life and career ==
Ingabire was a journalist at the Office Rwandaise de l'information. She was the chairperson of Transparency International Rwanda.

Ingabire died on 9 October 2025, at the age of 63.

== Awards ==
Under her leadership, Transparency International Rwanda was voted best organisation to come up with initiatives that promote good governance in the country in 2012, an award issued by the Rwanda Governance Board (RGB).
