= Aimable Karasira =

Rwandan singer and political activist (1977–2026)

Aimable Karasira Uzaramba
- Karasira in 2023
- Born: 1977; Butare Province, Rwanda
- Died: 6 May 2026 (aged 48); Nyarugenge Hospital, Kigali, Rwanda
- Occupations: Singer; political activist; lecturer; YouTuber
- Known for: Political commentary and criticism of the Rwandan government
- Website: karasira.org

Aimable Karasira Uzaramba (1977 – 6 May 2026) was a Rwandan singer, former university lecturer, YouTuber and political activist.

He became known for his online commentary criticising the Rwandan Patriotic Front (RPF) and the government of Rwanda. He was arrested in 2021 and sentenced in 2025 to five years in prison for inciting division. He died in custody in May 2026, on the day he was reportedly due to be released.

== Early life ==
Karasira was born in Butare Province, in present-day Huye District, in 1977. He was an ethnic Tutsi. His parents were killed during the genocide in 1994; Karasira later blamed forces of the Rwandan Patriotic Front for their deaths.

== Career ==
Karasira worked as a computer science lecturer at the University of Rwanda. He was later dismissed for what the university described as "disciplinary faults"; the university denied that his dismissal was linked to his political views.

He gained public attention through his YouTube channel, Ukuri Mbona ("The Truth As I See It"), where he discussed political and social issues and criticised the RPF and the government. He also appeared as a guest on other YouTube channels. His channel had more than 60,000 followers.

== Arrest and imprisonment ==
Karasira was arrested in 2021 and charged with genocide denial. He was among several Rwandan YouTubers arrested or sentenced in 2021 after publishing videos critical of the government. The YouTubers Dieudonne Niyonsenga and Yvonne Idamange were sentenced to 15 and 7 years respectively, while Nsengimana Theoneste was also arrested that year.

In 2025, Karasira was acquitted of charges of "justifying genocide, genocide denial and inciting public disorder". He was convicted of "inciting division" and sentenced to five years in prison. He was reported to have been tortured while in detention.

== Death ==
Karasira died at Nyarugenge Hospital in Kigali on 6 May 2026, at the age of 48. The Rwandan Correctional Service attributed his death to an overdose of prescription medication. A spokesperson said that Karasira had been suffering from high blood pressure, diabetes and poor mental health, and that he was being escorted out of prison when he attempted to take another dose of medication, which proved fatal.

The exiled Rwandan human rights activist Denise Zaneza described his death as suspicious and called for an independent and transparent investigation. She said Karasira had been imprisoned for "speaking about memory, injustice and the right to mourn all victims of the 1994 genocide".

== See also ==
- Human rights in Rwanda
- Freedom of the press in Rwanda
- Rwandan Patriotic Front
- Rwandan genocide denial
