= Samuel Dusengiyumva =

Rwandan politician

Mayor of Kigali
- Incumbent
- Assumed office December 15, 2023
- Preceded by: Pudence Rubingisa

Personal details
- Born: 1980 or 1981 (age 44–45) Ntongwe, Rwanda
- Occupation: Politician

Samuel Dusengiyumva is a Rwandan politician. In November 2019, he was made the Permanent Secretary in the Ministry of Local Government. In December 2023, Dusengiyumva was appointed as the mayor of Kigali City.

== Early life ==
He is from the former commune of Ntongwe, today in Ruhango District. He survived the genocide perpetrated against the Tutsis in 1994 at the age of 13. Both his mother and father were killed.

== Career ==
In 2009, he was the advisor to the State Minister of Primary and Secondary education.

Between 2009 and 2011, he was the national director of One Laptop per Child.

On November 6, 2019, he was made the Permanent Secretary in the Ministry of Local Government. he held this position until around he was inaugurated mayor.

He won his first mayoral election with 532 out of 638 of the votes cast. He replaced Pudence Rubingisa after he was appointed the governor of the Eastern Province. Samuel Dusengiyumva was appointed Kigali city councilor by President Paul Kagame on December 14, 2023.

His re-election on August, 2024, saw him win 397 of the votes cast.

On October 28, 2025, he attended and spoke at the Global City Tourism Summit in Busan and said that Kigali should draw lessons from the city. In order to prevent illegal building practices he and the city council planned to start deploying satellite-enabled technology. Dusengiyumva supported and helped create the My Tree Campaign which is to plant and then protect 3 million trees in an estimated 5 years. All trees planted are owned by the Kigali government.

== Personal life ==
Dusengiyumva is married to a doctor and has multiple children. He is the eldest of 5 siblings. Many of his children are named after his siblings.
