= 2011 Rwandan textile workers strike =

Labor dispute in Rwanda

- Date: February 15, 2011 – February 19, 2011
- Location: Kigali, Rwanda
- Caused by: Unfair working conditions, including low wages, lack of annual leave, non-paid overtime hours, poor working and health conditions, unfair termination of employment
- Methods: protest, strike
- Result: Reinstatement of unfairly terminated employees

Parties
UTEXRWA textile factory workforce	UTEXRWA textile factory management

On February 15, 2011, in Kigali, Rwanda more than 500 workers at the UTEXRWA textile factory began a five-day long strike in protest of unfair working conditions that started when new management came into power. The strikers were protesting low wages of RWF15,800 a month, lack of annual leave, non-paid overtime hours, and poor working and health conditions.

The strikers were also protesting for thirty-three employees that were previously let go with little explanation. While the strike was an act of nonviolence, but could also be looked at under the paradox of repression, which is used by the opponents of nonviolent activists to deter them from gaining momentum in their campaign. When UTEXRWA manager Trivets Deepak let the thirty-three workers go, it was in an attempt to further silence complaints.

== History ==
UTEXRWA is a mass production garment factory in Kigali. The factory produces garments made of cotton, synthetic, and other blended fabrics to make protective clothing for uniforms including firefighting, medical, and other workforces. Conflicts within the factory between management and workers began when the textile factory dismissed thirty-three workers abruptly with the excuse that they were restructuring, but as soon as the workers were dismissed, the factory hired employees to replace them.

According to Anna Mugabo, the Director General of Labour and Employment, UTEXRWA did not follow Article 33 of Rwandan labour law when dismissing the employees. The factory should have based the dismissal on performance, qualification, and years with the company, and should have also given the dismissed employees one month's notice. It was speculated that the workers were dismissed because they were speaking about their health and low wage concerns.

This dismissal caused other workers to conduct a protest with regards to low wages, lack of annual leave, lack of additional payment for overtime hours, as well as the hazardous working conditions within the factory. When discussing the conditions of the factory, one elderly woman worker stated, “We are paid very little and the conditions in which we work are hazardous to our health.”

The workers also noted that they were specifically concerned about the recent denial of milk, which was previously provided to the workers to help reduce the amount of health concerns as a result of the harsh chemicals they were surrounded by in the workplace. Lastly, the strikers were in protest of the lack of ability to express their concerns which was proven when the thirty-three other employees that stood up to the new management before them were let go.

=== Labour rights ===
Labour laws in Rwanda allow all paid workers the right to join or form unions and conduct strikes. However, strikes must be approved by the Ministry of Public Service and Labour, which has the right to implement restrictions on individual striking groups.

Labour laws are often violated. There is no minimum wage in Rwanda, only regulations on working hours. The law states that a work week consists of forty-five hours and that employees are entitled to eighteen to twenty-one days annually for paid leave. Workers are entitled to paid days off for holidays and six weeks’ maternity leave. There are no labour laws around overtime pay increases, nor does it allow workers to leave a dangerous working situation without risk of losing their job. The law does require employers to allow rest breaks during the work day.

== Strike ==
The strike lasted five days from February 15 to February 19. It was estimated that five hundred Rwandan textile workers participated in the strike outside the UTEXRWA textile factory. Strikers prepared speeches that they presented to the manager of UTEXRWA Trivets Deepak, in order to voice their concerns about the companies’ actions. The strikers gained news coverage and several allies. Gasabo District officials, Francois Ntakiyimana, the General Secretary of the Congress of Labour Fraternity in Rwanda, and Anna Mugabo, the Director General of Labour and Employment also joined the protestors to mediate the situation. The textile strikers were a part of the Central Union of Rwanda workers and received permission to strike through the Ministry of Public Service and Labour. The rights of the strikers were supposed to be protected while they participated in their strike but when they ended the strike several strikers were fired. The strikers also worked with the Brotherhood of Rwanda who attempted to assist them through negotiations with the UTEXRWA.

=== February 15, 2011 ===
The morning of February 15, 2011, textile strikers gathered in front of the UTEXRWA factory in protest. They conducted public speeches targeted to the Gasabo District Executive Secretary Ibrahim Ndagijimana, and the manager of the factory, Trivets Deepak. District officials came to mediate the strike and the General Secretary of the Congress of Labour Fraternity in Rwanda (COTRAF), Francois Mtakiyimana, came to show support for the strikers.

One of the reasons the workers were on strike was their lack of ability to express their concerns with the manager. One worker stated, “Anyone who tries to raise their voice here is dismissed”. The COTRAF believe that the UTEXRWA factory violated labor rights and article 120 of the Labour Code when they did not allow the workers to express their grievances. Article 120 of the Labour Code states that workers throughout Rwanda have “the right to air out their views concerning their work.”

=== February 16, 2011 ===
The strike continued on February 16, 2011, and the strikers were accompanied by Anna Mugabo, the Director General of Labour and Employment in the Ministry of Public Service and Labour, who worked as a mediator for the day. Anna Mugabo promised the workers that she would provide compensation for the dismissed workers if they were able to prove that their rights outlined in Article 120 of the Labour Code were violated. The police were also present during the strike to ensure a sense of calm.

=== February 19, 2011 ===
Anna Mugabo met with Trivets Deepak and the thirty-three dismissed employees to persuade Deepak to give the employees their jobs back. Mugabo explained that the termination of the thirty-three worker's jobs was a violation of Article 33 of the Labour Law. In the Labour Law, Article 33 states that “the dismissal ranking should be done in accordance with the performance, professional qualification, time spent in the company, and social responsibilities.” It also explains that the manager should have provided a month's notice prior to termination and given the employees their terminal benefits, which the thirty-three employees did not receive.

=== Conclusion ===
The strike ended on February 19 with little movement. The strikers were able to persuade the manager to give the thirty-three dismissed employees their jobs back, but failed to succeed in any other initial goals of the strike.
