= Patrick Mazimhaka =

Rwandan political (1948–2018)

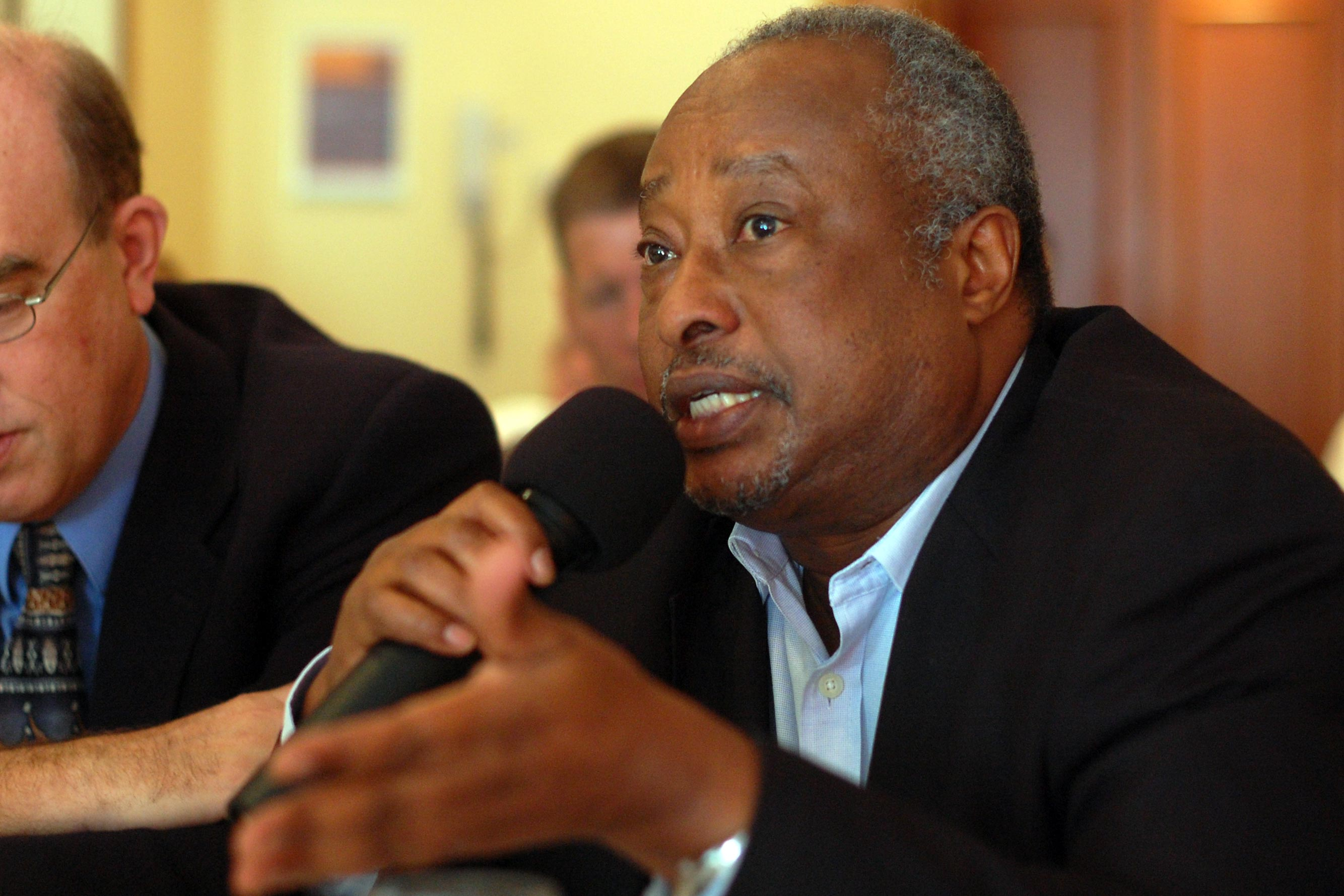
Patrick Mazimhaka, February 2009

Patrick Kayumbu Mazimhaka (26 April 1948 – 25 January 2018) was the former Deputy Chairperson of the African Union's African Commission. He was elected the Deputy Chairperson of the African Union Commission in July 2003 held in Maputo, Mozambique, and held the office until 6 February 2008, when he was succeeded by Erastus J. O. Mwencha. He was, until his election, the Senior Presidential Advisor to the President of Rwanda on the Great Lakes Region.

== Youth and education ==
Patrick Kayumbu Mazimhaka was born in Rwanda and was raised and educated in Uganda, having left Rwanda in 1962 as a young boy in the aftermath of the 1959 Rwanda Revolution, which precipitated a large exodus of Rwandan refugees to Uganda. He attended Ntare School for his secondary education. He pursued his undergraduate studies at Makerere University in Kampala where he obtained a Bachelor of Science Degree in Geology. He received a Master of Science degree in 1975.

He started working as a lecturer in the Faculty of Science at Makerere University and was soon appointed the Head of Department of Geology in the same Faculty. In early 1981 Mazimhaka moved to Kenya where he briefly worked as a consultant with a mining company before he finally relocated to Canada with his family.

== Early career ==
While in Canada, he came into contact with many Rwandans who were determined as much as he was to return to Rwanda some day. He soon became deeply involved in the Rwandese Patriotic Front (RPF) activities, which had been founded to launch a struggle against the then Rwandan government that had denied its citizens the right to return to their homeland. When the RPF launched an armed war on 1 October 1990 against the Rwandan government, Mazimhaka was appointed RPF's Commissioner for External Relations. On September 15, 1993, he led the RPF delegation to pressure the UN at its headquarters in New York for deployment of peacekeeping troops, which would later go on to form the UNAMIR. He was later elected the vice-chairman of RPF in 1993, a position he held until 1998.

Mazimhaka was appointed the Minister of Youth, Sports and Cooperatives in July 1994 soon after the RPF had ousted the regime of Juvénal Habyarimana in April 1994. He held this position until 1996, when he was made Minister of Rehabilitation and Social Affairs. A year later he was appointed Minister in the Office of the President until 2000 when he was made a Special Envoy of the President.

It was as a Special Envoy that Mazimhaka's ability in diplomacy was tested most. While dealing with the Rwandan government's policy on the Great Lakes, he was involved in the negotiations that led to several agreements, including the 2002 Pretoria agreement. This agreement outlined the disarmament of the former Rwandan Armed Forces (Ex-FAR) and the Interahamwe militia on the one hand, and the withdrawal of Rwandan forces from the Democratic Republic of Congo (DRC) on the other. He had also previously been involved in negotiations for the formulation and implementation of The Lusaka Ceasefire Agreement in the DRC, while Minister in 1999.

== Later activity ==
Mazimhaka was later an independent consultant in business, international diplomacy and security studies, with a particular interest in Africa. He was also the chairman of the board of Advisors of The Brenthurst Foundation.

== Death ==
Mazimhaka died on the morning of 25 January 2018 in India. He was survived by his wife, Jolly Rwanyonga Mazimhaka, and their three daughters.
