= 2023 in Rwanda =

- Decades: 2000s; 2010s; 2020s
- See also: Other events of 2023; List of years in Rwanda

Events in the year 2023 in Rwanda.

== Incumbents ==
- President: Paul Kagame
- Prime minister: Édouard Ngirente

== Events ==
- 25 January – A DRC Air Force Sukhoi Su-25 is hit by anti-aircraft fire over the Rwandan border. The Rwandan government says its forces took "defensive measures" against a plane that had "violated its airspace".
- 3 May – 2023 Rwanda and Uganda floods
- 7 September – A man is arrested in Kigali, after fourteen people are found dead at his house. Denis Kazungu, the suspected serial killer lured his victims from bars to his house.
- September – 2023 Rwandan parliamentary election

=== Ongoing ===
- 2022–2023 Democratic Republic of the Congo–Rwanda tensions
- COVID-19 pandemic in Rwanda
