= Monique Mukaruliza =

Rwandan politician

Monique Mukaruliza was a Rwandan politician who served as strategic advisor to the Ministry of Foreign Affairs and International Cooperation (MINAFETT) of Rwanda.

== Career ==
Before her current appointment, Mukaruliza has been appointed as former Ambassador of Rwanda to Zambia. She served as mayor of Kigali between 2016 and 2017, the third female mayor of the city since 1996. She was chairperson of RPF in Kigali City and former First Minister of East African Community (MINEAC) Affairs. Mukaruliza started responsibilities as MINEAC minister in 2008 up to 25 February 2013. Before she was appointed in MINEAC, Mukaruliza had been a representative of African Union in Sudan and served as Deputy Special Representative of the AU Commission Chairman to Sudan between 2005 and 2008. She also played a role in the formation of and subsequent reforms at the Rwanda Revenue Authority when she served as commissioner for Quality Assurance (Internal Audit and Internal Affairs). She has experience in banking services as she served as a Commissioner for Domestic Taxes, Financial Analyst at the Bank of Kigali between 1998 and 2001.
