= 1962 in Rwanda =

- Decades: 1950s; 1960s; 1970s; 1980s
- See also: Other events of 1962; List of years in Rwanda

The following lists events that happened during 1962 in Rwanda.

== Incumbents ==
- President: Grégoire Kayibanda (starting 26 October)

== Events ==
=== July ===
- July 1 - Rwanda gains its independence from Belgium.
