= Marie Chantal Rwakazina =

Rwandan politician

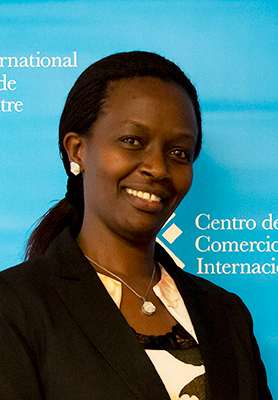
Marie Chantal Rwakazina

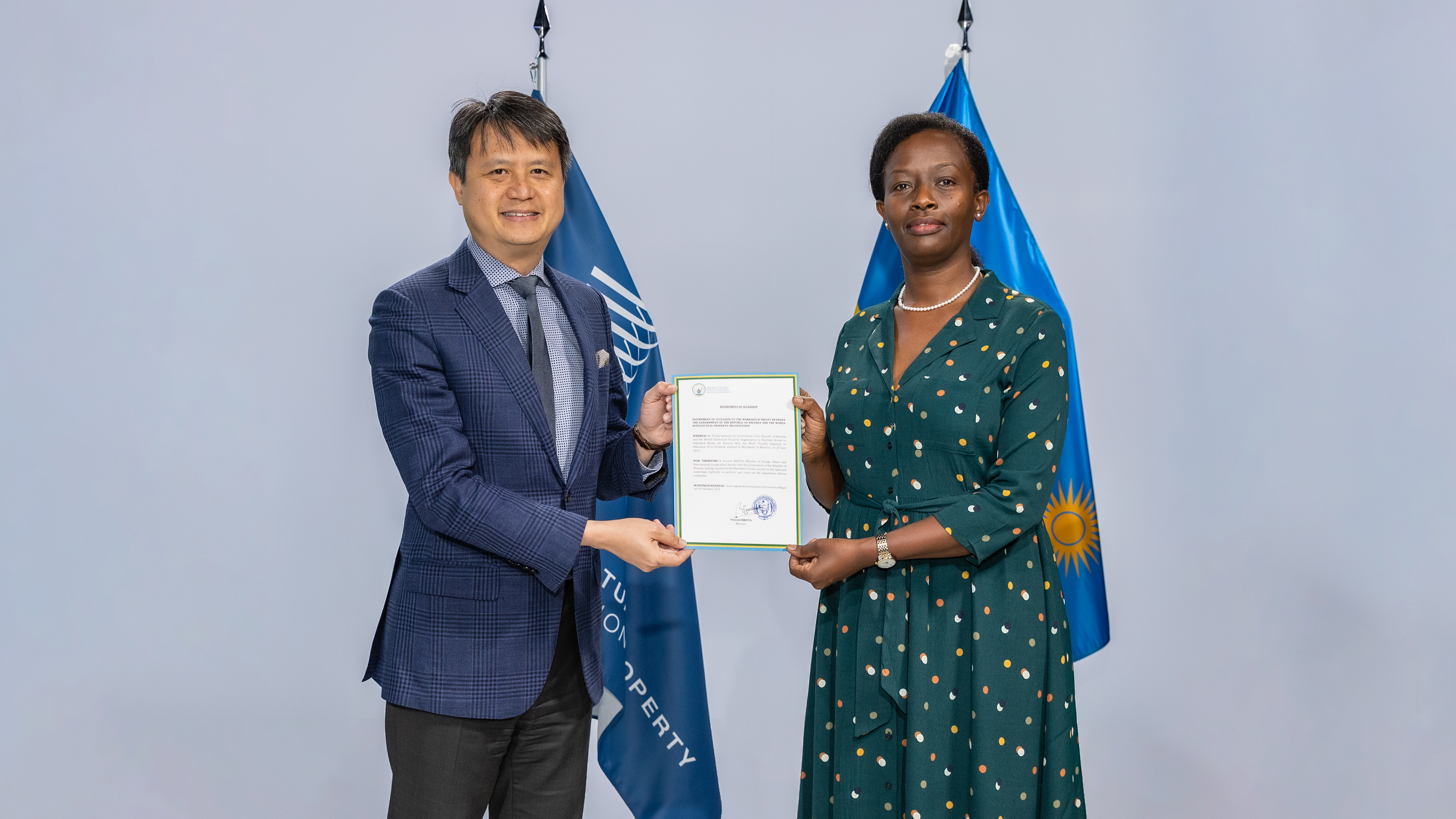
Rwanda Joins WIPO's Marrakesh Treaty

Marie Chantal Rwakazina is a Rwandan diplomat and politician who serves as the ambassador of the Republic of Rwanda to Switzerland and permanent representative to the United Nations.

== Background and education ==
Rwakazina holds a Bachelor's degree in Economics from the National University of Rwanda (1995–2000) and a Master's degree in Development Studies from the Fondation Universitaire Luxembourgeoise, Arlon, Belgium (2001–2003).

== Career ==
Before her current appointment, Rwakazina also has been appointed as Ambassador of Rwanda to the Holy See, the Federal Republic of Austria and other international Organizations in Vienna. On 4 December 2020, Amb. Rwakazina presented letters of credence to Pope Francis and the event was held at the Apostolic Palace in the Vatican City. Prior to her appointment to Geneva, she had been serving as the mayor of Kigali from 2018 to 2019. Rwakazina is a development expert who has been working with the United Nations Development Programme/One, where she was a United Nations Coordination Analyst in Kigali-Rwanda from 2013 to 2018.
