= Aisa Kirabo Kacyira =

Rwandan diplomat (1963 or 1964 – 2025)

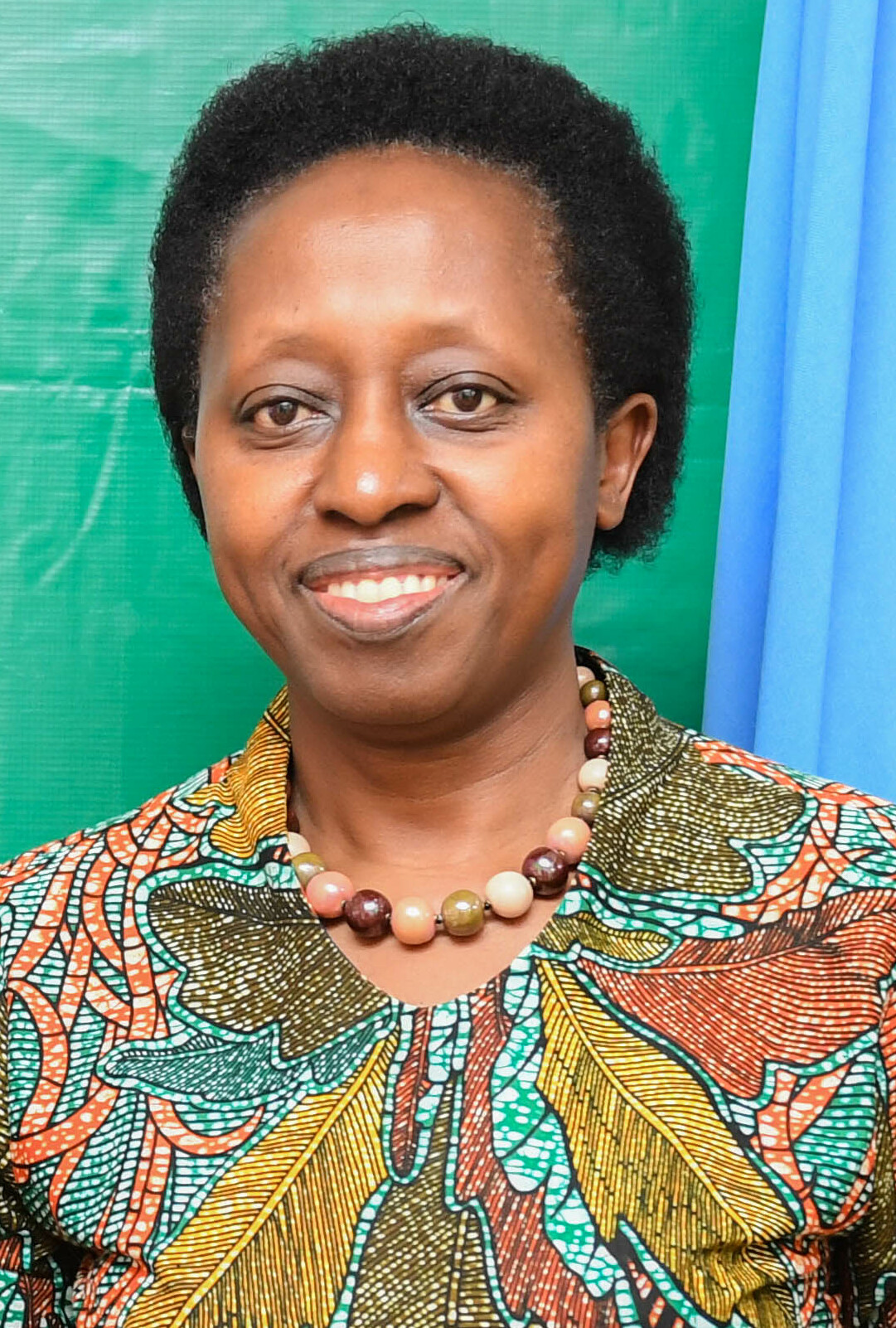
- Aisa Kirabo Kacyira in 2023

Mayor of Kigali
- In office 2006–2011
- Preceded by: Theoneste Mutsindashyaka
- Succeeded by: Fidèle Ndayisaba

Personal details
- Born: 1963 or 1964
- Died: 12 August 2025 (aged 61)
- Children: 4
- Education: Makerere University; James Cook University

Aisa Kirabo Kacyira (1963 or 1964 – 12 August 2025) was a Rwandan diplomat who was Deputy Executive Director Assistant Secretary-General of the United Nations Human Settlements Programme (UN-Habitat) from 2011 to 2018. In this capacity, she played a significant role in developing sustainable cities and human settlements across the world, working closely with both governmental and non-governmental organizations. She was once the Governor of the Eastern Province of Rwanda, and was the Mayor of Kigali from 2006 to 2011.

== Life and career ==
Aisa Kirabo Kacyira graduated from James Cook University in Australia with a Master's degree in veterinary science in animal production and economics, after studying veterinary medicine at Makerere University in Uganda; she had previously studied at the School of Banking and Property Management (SFB).

== Personal life and death ==
Kacyira was married and had four children. She died on 12 August 2025, at the age of 61.

== Awards ==
In 2008, the city of Kigali received an award from UN HABITAT, which was received by Aisa Kirabo Kacyira, who was also the mayor of Kigali at the time.
