= 1990 in Rwanda =

- Decades: 1970s; 1980s; 1990s; 2000s; 2010s
- See also: Other events of 1990; List of years in Rwanda

The following lists events that happened during 1990 in Rwanda.

== Incumbents ==
- President: Juvénal Habyarimana

== Events ==
=== October ===
- October 2 - The Tutsi Rwandan Patriotic Front makes an attack from Uganda, starting the Rwandan Civil War.
