= 1981 in Rwanda =

- Decades: 1960s; 1970s; 1980s; 1990s; 2000s
- See also: Other events of 1981; List of years in Rwanda

The following lists events that happened during 1981 in Rwanda.

== Incumbents ==
- President: Juvénal Habyarimana

== Events ==
=== December ===
- December 28 – Rwandan parliamentary election, 1981
