= 1985 in Rwanda =

- Decades: 1960s; 1970s; 1980s; 1990s; 2000s
- See also: Other events of 1985; List of years in Rwanda

The following lists events that happened during 1985 in Rwanda.

== Incumbents ==
- President: Juvénal Habyarimana

== Events ==
=== December ===
- December 26 - American naturalist Dian Fossey is murdered in her Rwandan cabin. It is still unknown who committed the murder.
