= Architecture of Rwanda =

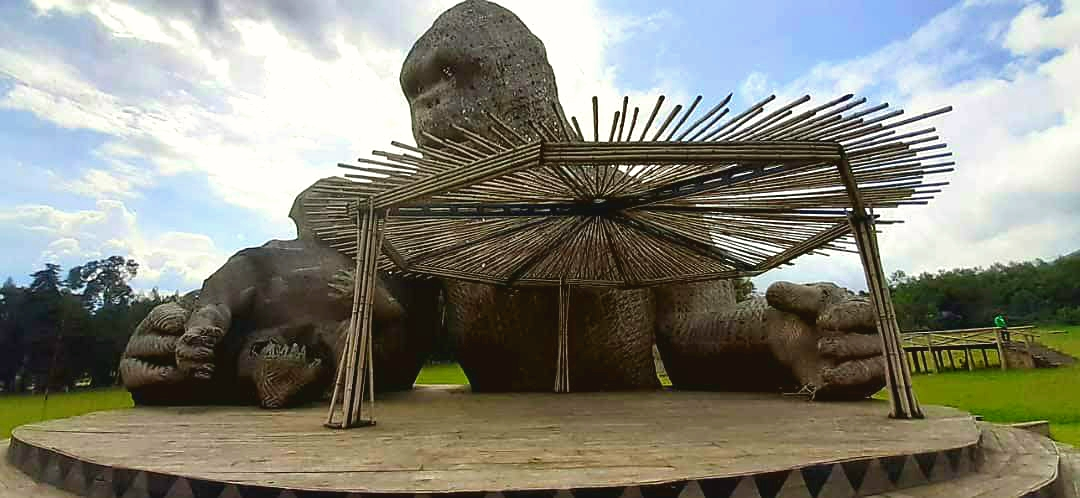
Musanze Gorilla naming monument

Rwandan architecture spans over three distinct historical periods: pre-colonial (sometimes called vernacular), colonial and contemporary (post-colonial). The National Vision of Modern Rwandan architecture aspires to be sustainable and reflective of Rwandan identity.

== Precolonial architecture ==
Rwanda's precolonial architecture often reflects the country's environment, social hierarchy, and cultural continuity. Materials were locally sourced and designs were adapted to the hilly landscape. Construction techniques were passed down through oral tradition and the designs were symbolic of unity and the continuity of life.

The pre-colonial term for huts is inzu which can be categorised into types such as: domical (beehive-shaped), cylindrical with mud walls, rectangular with rounded and sloping at ends, square-shaped hut, amongst others.

Families lived in isolated compounds, each surrounded by their own farmland. These homesteads, often called Urugo, included multiple huts and were enclosed by hedges or reed fences. Traditional compounds often feature a central courtyard used for cooking, storage and communal activities. In wealthier households, huts often had designated functions, for example: chief hut, woman's hut and a hut reserved for cooking and one for teenage girls or visitors.

The core structure of these huts was flexible wooden skeletons, often made from Markhamia, Cypress or Bamboo poles. The poles were bent inwards to form a dome, tied together with reed or bamboo and secured with banana bark or papyrus ropes. The dome was then thatched with overlapping bundles of marsh grass tied to frame rings. The walls were made of interwoven sticks plastered with mud.

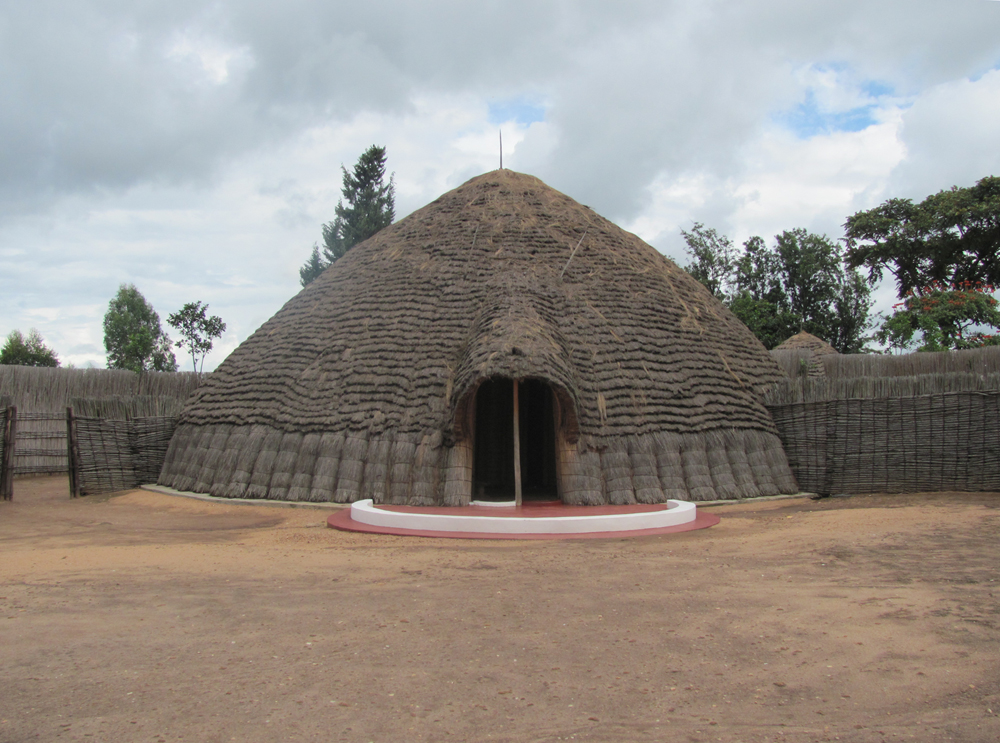
The ancient King's Palace in Nyanza

Every hut had one entrance, covered by a woven porch that provides insulation suited to the humidity of the highlands. Storage spaces and latrines were also present, reflecting both the agro-pastoral lifestyle and the hilly terrain of Rwanda.

== Colonial architecture ==
Rwanda was colonised both by Germany (1897-1916) and Belgium (1916 - 1962). Belgian colonial architecture in Rwanda was modest and administrative because of its limited investment and Anti-Urbanisation policies. This period marked the shift towards Europeanised architecture.

Germany's presence in Rwanda was relatively short, but it left behind some early colonial buildings. The most notable is Richard Kandt's House, showcasing the introduction of metal roofing, brick walls, and hipped roofing.

Belgian influence however, was more extensive and institutional. The Belgians built Catholic schools, churches, prisons and administrative offices, as well as introduced new materials like fired clay bricks and cement. However, segregational zoning was introduced and European areas were separated from indigenous settlements. Circular buildings were replaced with strict, rectangular buildings with disregard for cultural identity.

New construction materials allowed for greater durability and permanence in buildings. Symmetrical facades and gable roofs were introduced, which emphasised order. Colonial buildings introduced electrical wiring, plumbing and glass windows which had previously been absent.

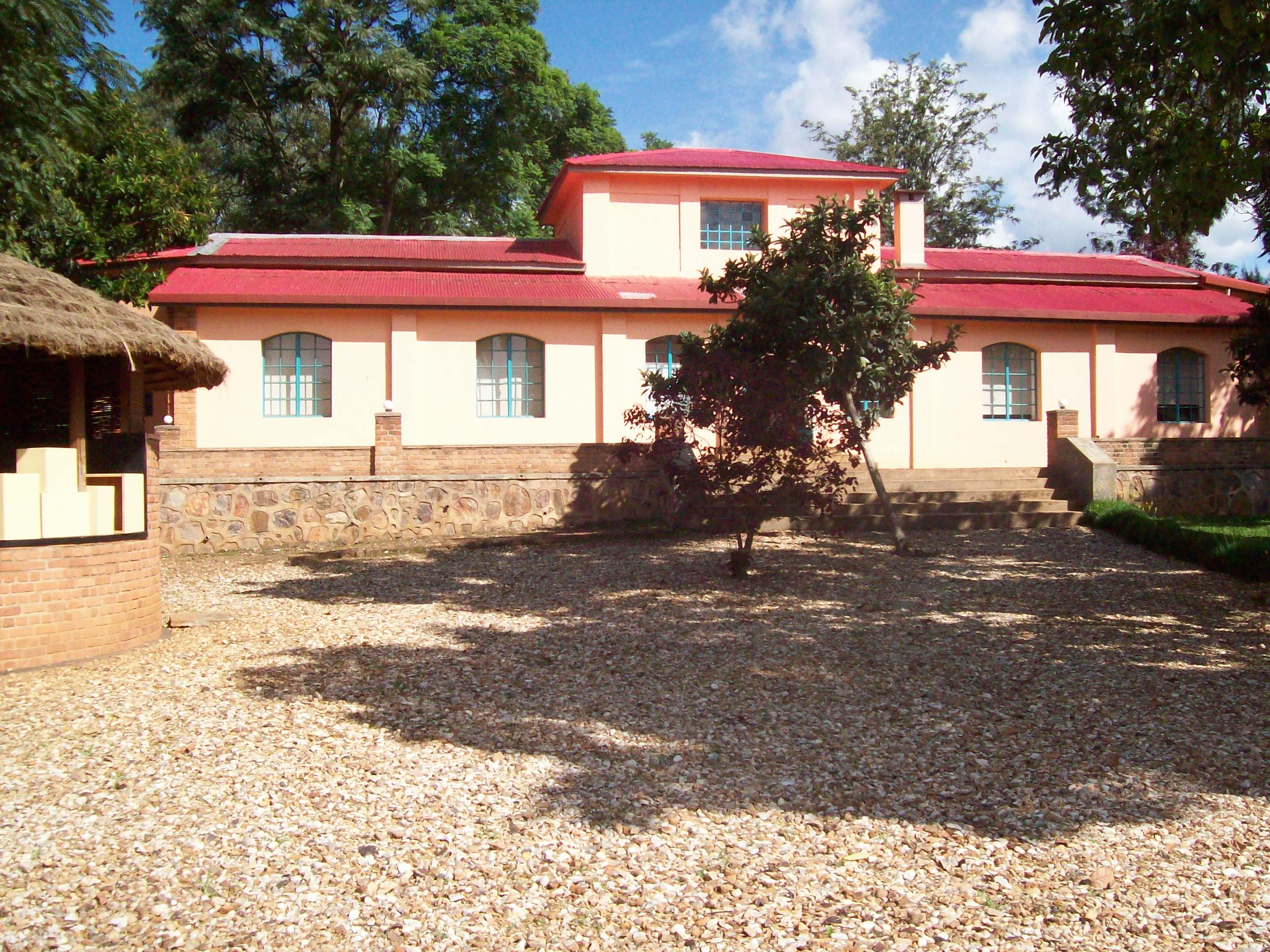
House of Richard Kandt in Kigali

However, symbolic vernacular forms such as the inzu were replaced, and institutional architecture was adopted for surveillance and control. Segregated urban layouts combined with elevated ground allowed colonial authorities to assert dominance over indigenous settlements.

== Contemporary architecture ==
Modern Rwandan architecture draws inspiration from traditional forms while increasingly incorporating sustainable materials to express national identity and environmental responsibility. It is defined by symbolic reinterpretation of traditional forms like circular plans, use of local materials and modern systems, and sustainably grounded strategies such as passive ventilation.

This style emerged after the 1994 genocide as a deliberate act of cultural and national redefinition. After the genocide, Rwanda suffered the destruction of homes, institutions and infrastructure. The urgency to rebuild created space for new architectural thinking as it could be a tool for reconciliation and a practical response to trauma.

The use of traditional forms preserves symbolic meaning while adapting to modern urban demands. Motifs such as Imigongo patterns are commonly incorporated, alongside spacial symbolism.

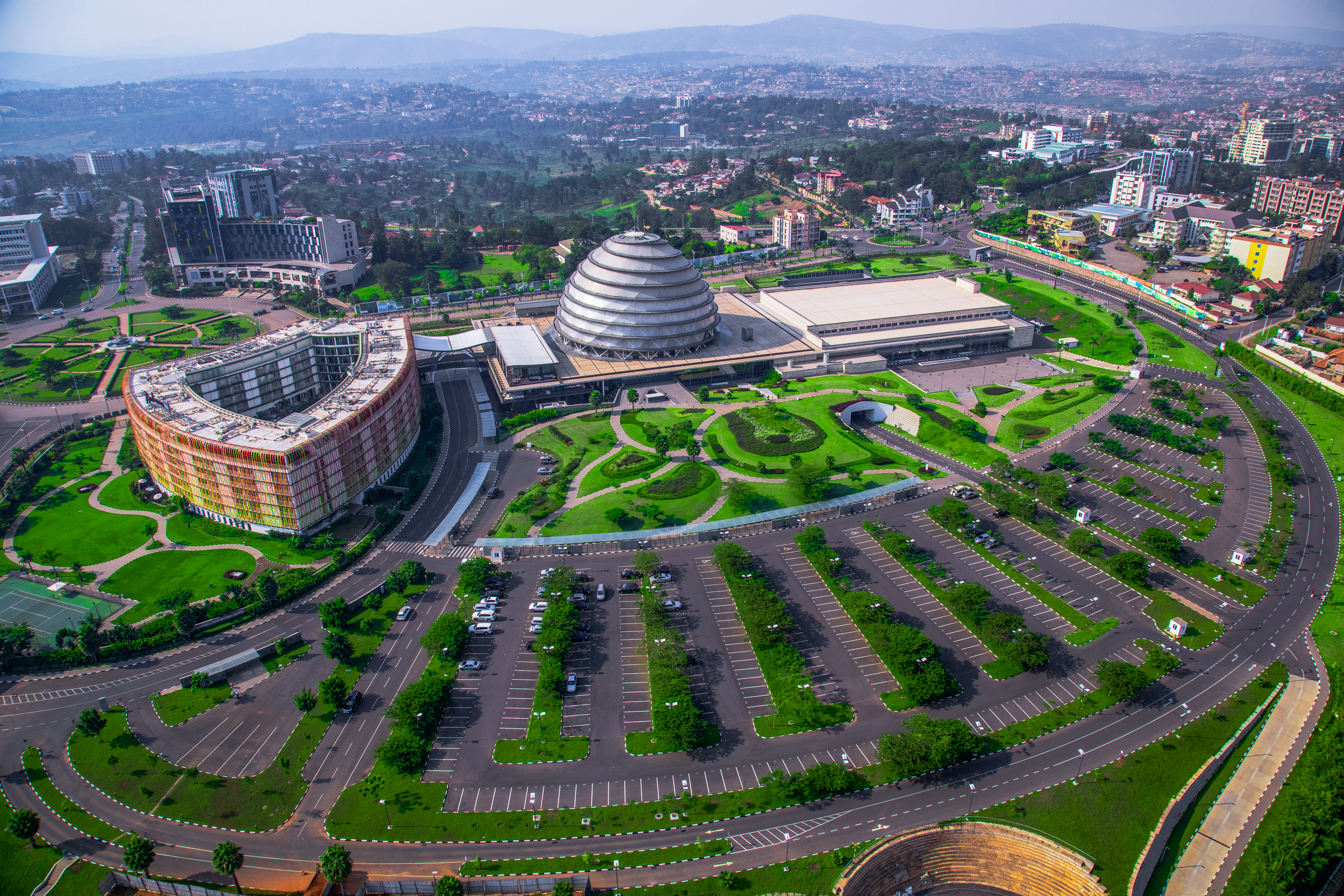
Kigali Convention centre

Examples of local material usage are rammed earth, compressed stabilised earth blocks (CSEBs), volcanic stone and eucalyptus timber. Modular and prefabricated systems are beginning to be implemented to upgrade informal settlements. Passive cooling and lighting strategies such as cross-ventilation are increasingly used to reduce need for mechanical systems like air conditioning and electric lighting. Compact layouts are implemented to support public transit and the high population density.

== Gallery ==
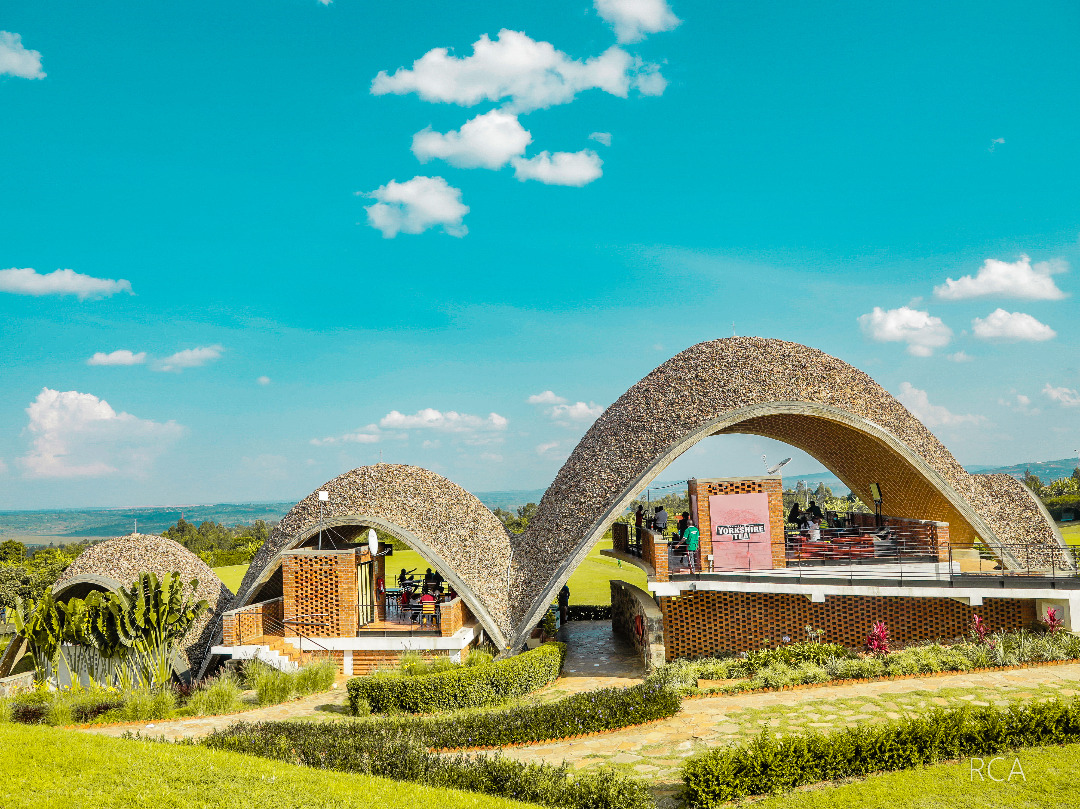
Gahanga cricket stadium

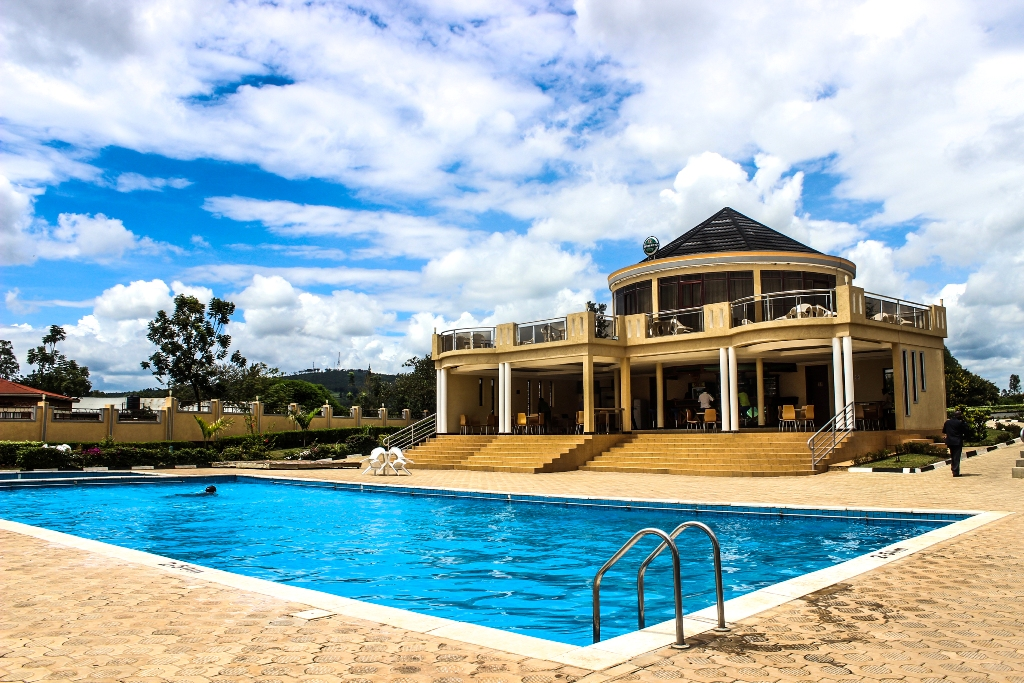
Nyamata, Bugesera

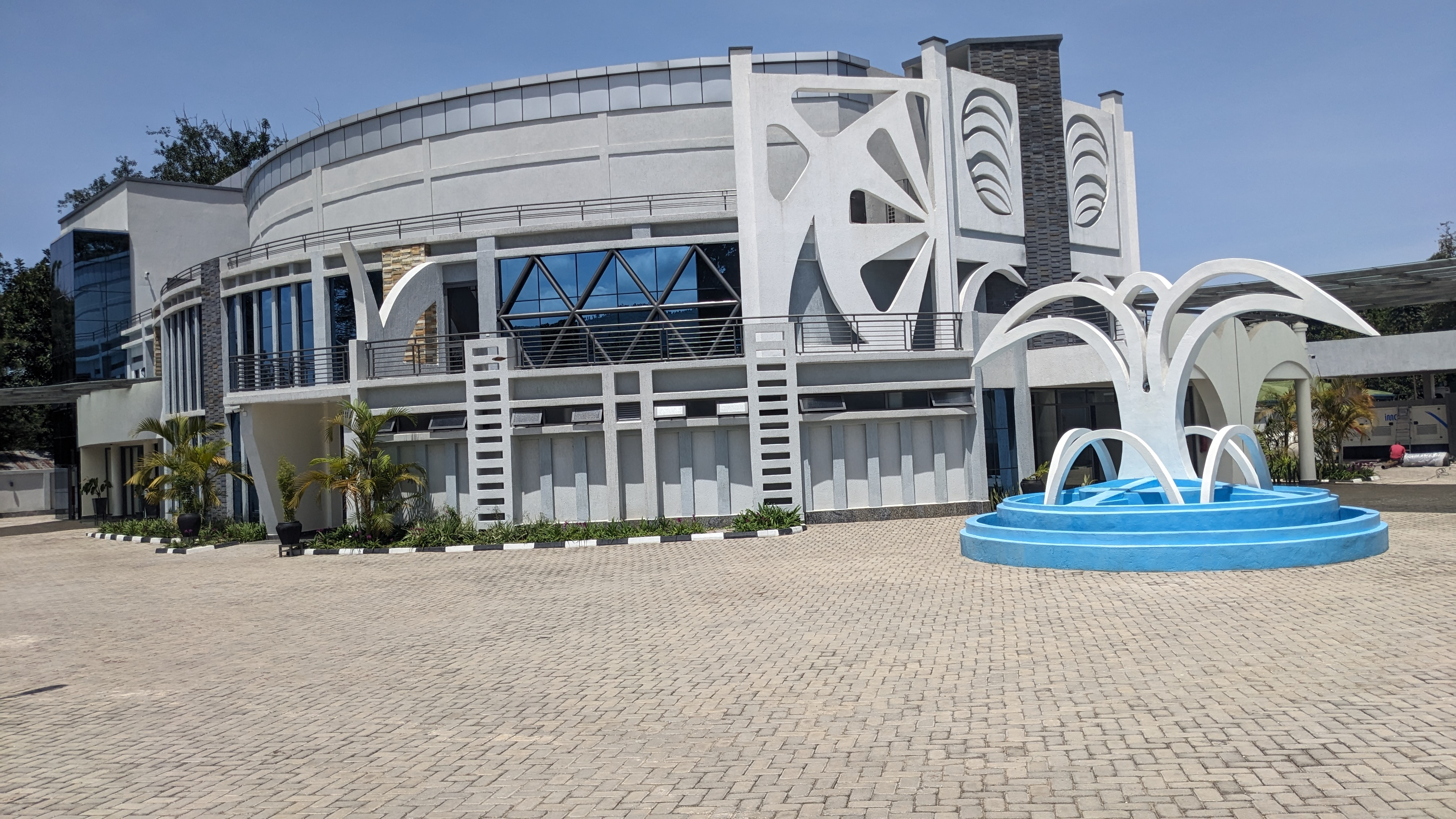
Kivu Intare Arena

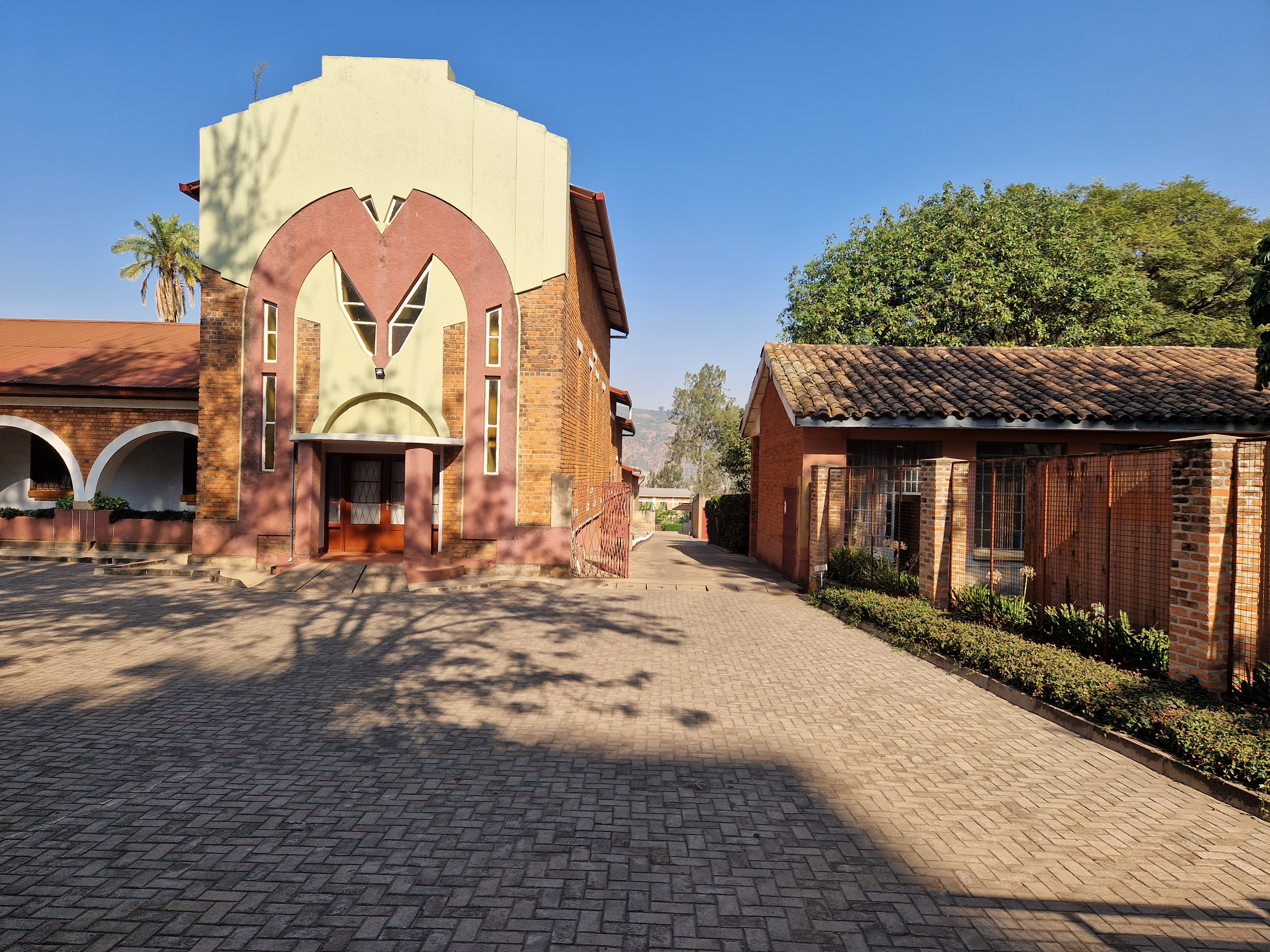
Notre Dame de Cite Church, Kigali

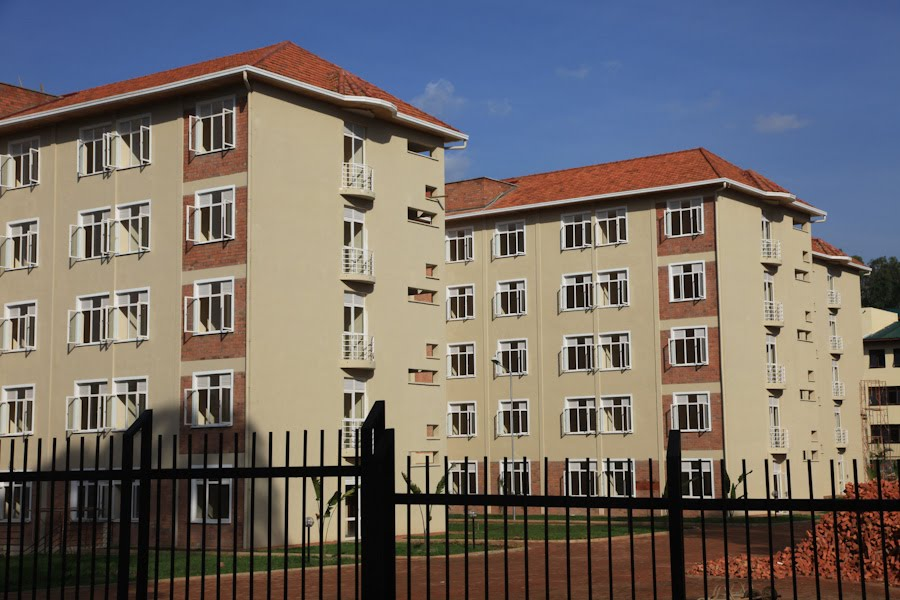
A campus

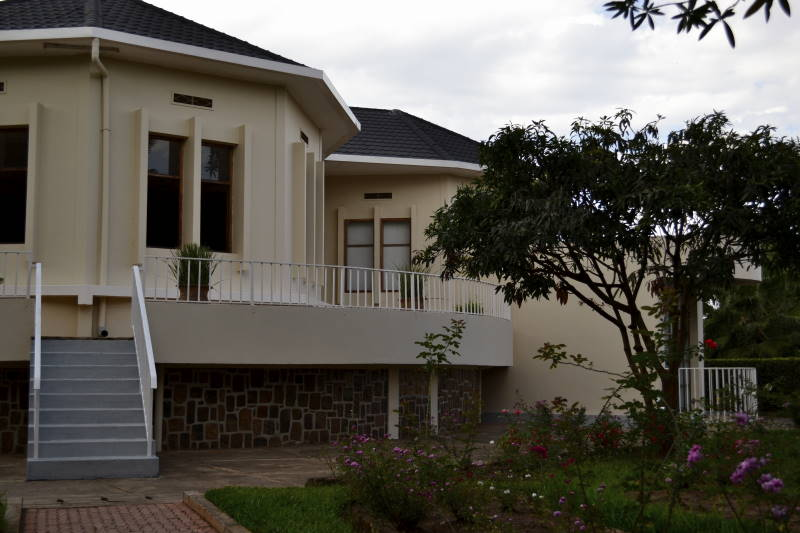
Buildings in Kigali

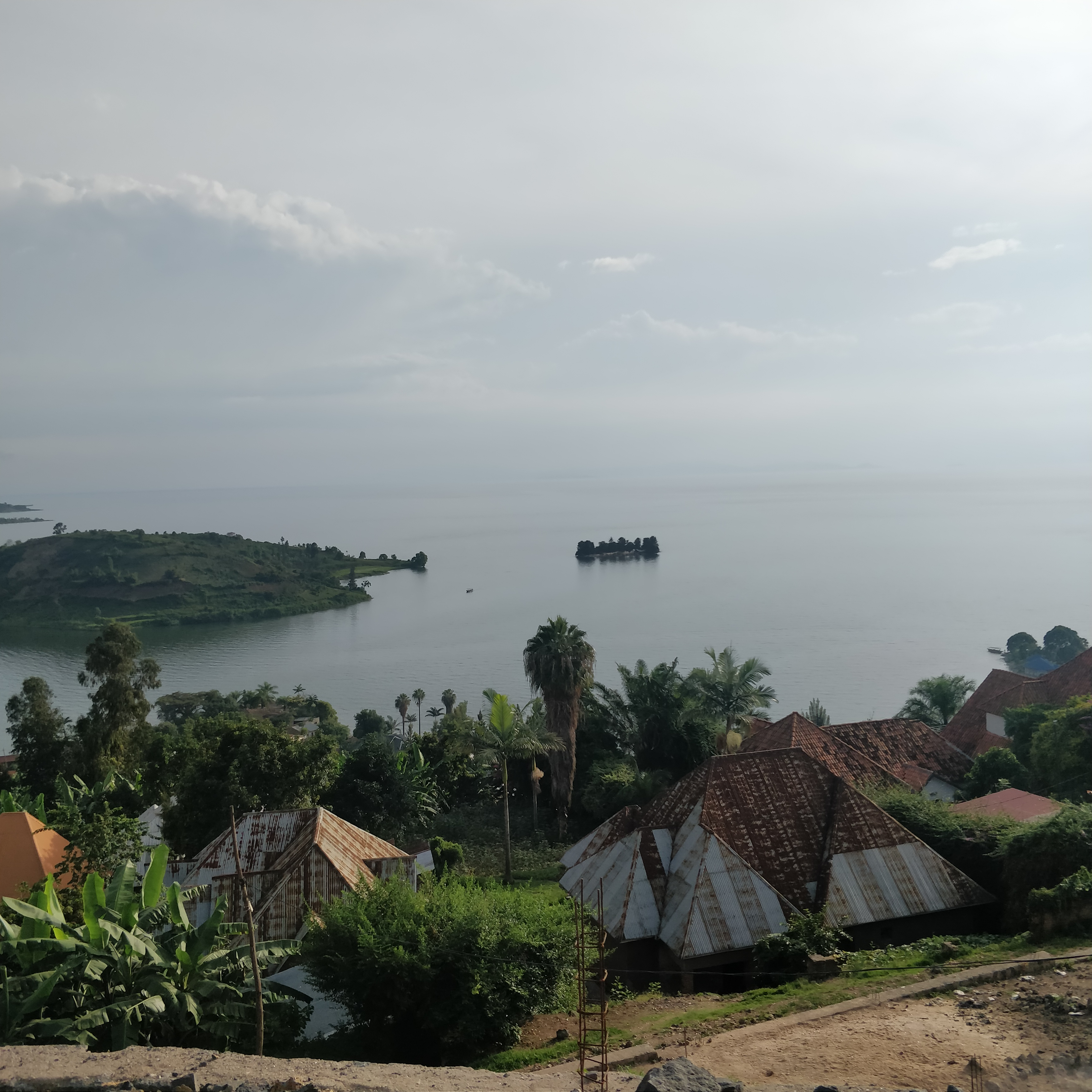
Gisenyi with houses shown

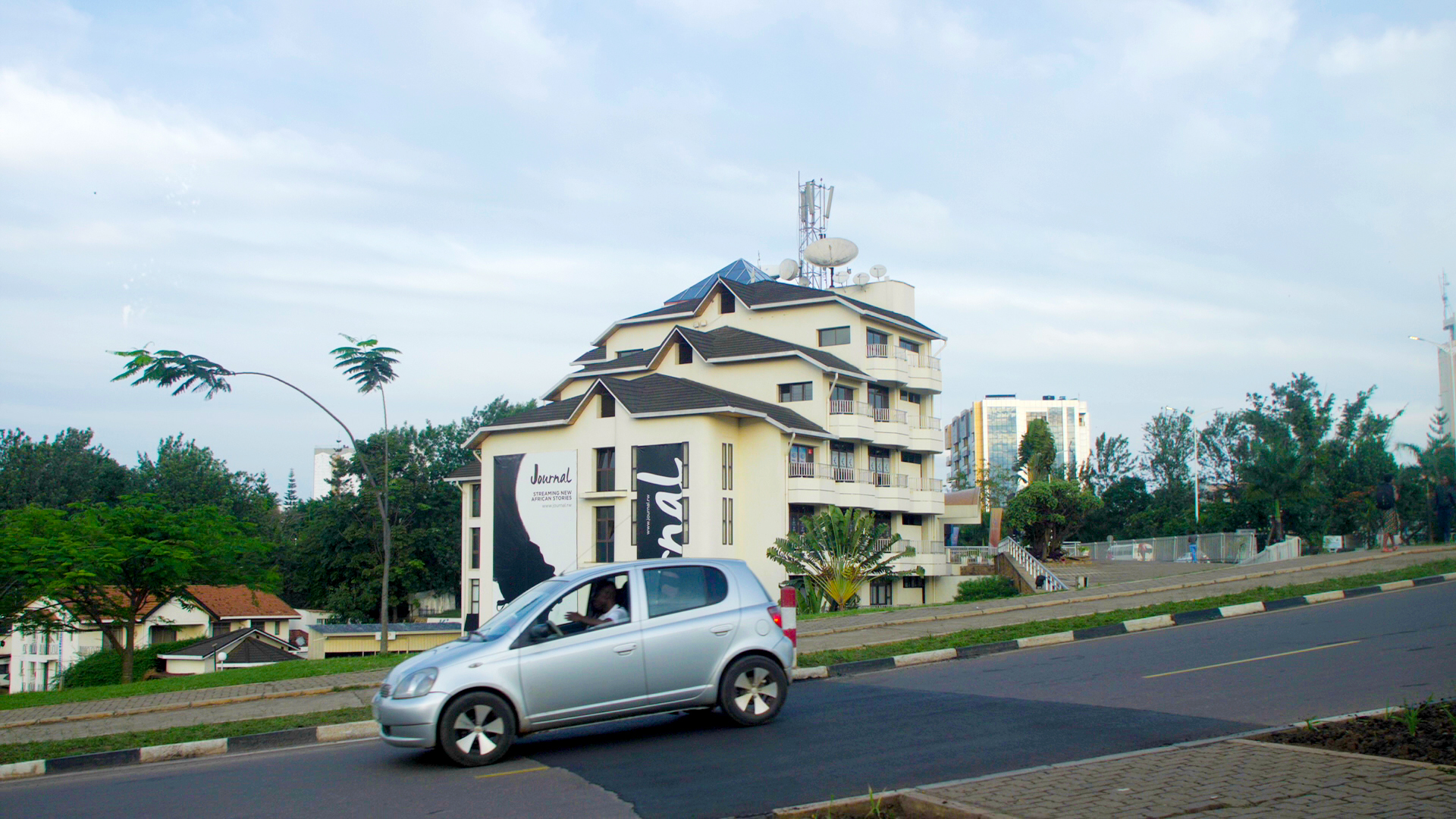
Buildings near Parliament offices

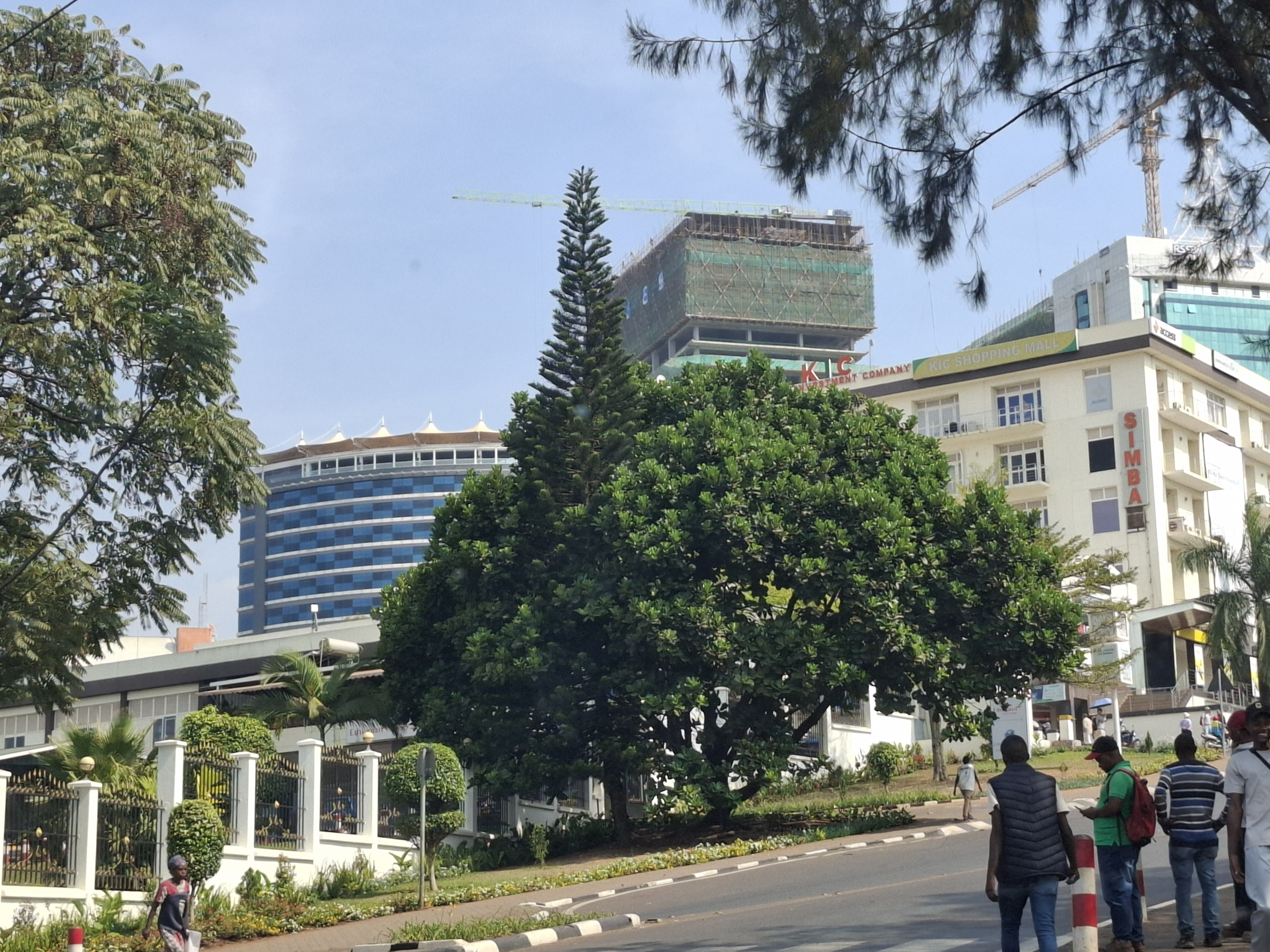
A few buildings in Kigali, Rwanda
