= Anti-urbanisation policies in the Belgian Congo and Ruanda-Urundi =

Anti-urbanisation policies in Belgium

Belgium implemented anti-urbanisation policies as part of its colonial rule in the Belgian Congo (present-day Democratic Republic of the Congo) and Ruanda-Urundi (present-day Rwanda and Burundi). These policies were designed to inhibit the formation of large, politically active African populations by restricting them to rural environments where they were easier to control.

Although African urbanisation did occur, particularly in the Congo during the 1940s–1950s, it was largely driven by economic needs. Belgian colonial authorities continued to discourage long-term African settlement in urban areas.

== Motivations ==
Although Leopold II of Belgium presented his colonial missions as philanthropic, Belgium's goals in Central Africa were primarily extractive—focused on raw materials and labour. Cities such as Léopoldville (now Kinshasa) and Elisabethville (now Lubumbashi) served as administrative hubs to support extraction, not places for African settlement. Catholic missionaries and the limited number of European settlers were concerned that urbanisation would weaken their control over rural populations.

Belgium’s indirect rule system empowered traditional chiefs in rural areas. This limited African political access by decentralising authority to prevent resistance.

Despite discouragement, economic demands in mining and agriculture required large numbers of African workers in cities, leading to rural-urban migration from the 1940s onward. Urban areas also offered limited education and access to imported goods.

However, Belgian officials feared political instability if Africans became a majority in urban centres. Policies were developed to prevent long-term African urbanisation.

== Forced ruralisation (1930s–1950s) ==
From the 1930s to 1950s, colonial administrators implemented the paysannat system, agricultural settlement schemes where Africans were made to live in fixed rural blocks with enforced cultivation practices. This forcibly tied African livelihoods to the countryside, deepening rural dependence. These schemes were closely monitored to increase agricultural output while discouraging migration to cities.

== Restricted urban access (1920s–1950s) ==
In both Congo and Ruanda-Urundi, African access to urban areas was strictly limited. Administrators labelled urban Africans as "lazy" or "morally corrupt," and Catholic missions described cities as socially dangerous.

Urban segregation placed Africans in peripheral areas with inadequate infrastructure and services, while European districts received most state investment.

Africans were required to carry pass cards or work permits to live in towns. Such legal restrictions limited the freedom to settle or move freely to urban zones, therefore preventing communities from forming.

Infrastructure investment focused on extraction, not urban development, worsening living conditions for African city residents.

Temporary worker housing encouraged circular migration, where workers commuted between urban jobs and rural homes, maintaining village ties. This system ensured that urban African workers stayed socially rooted in rural areas.

== Limited education in Ruanda-Urundi (1910s–1930s) ==
Belgian authorities and Catholic missions held that Africans did not require education beyond basic obedience. Formal schooling was limited and geared towards creating manual labourers. By stunting educational access, colonial powers stunted an emergence of an educated urban African middle class that could challenge colonial rule.

Education was not government-led but controlled by missions, which taught basic literacy and vocational skills. By denying access to broader knowledge or urban skills, Belgian policy structurally restricted African upward mobility and reinforced a cycle of dependence on colonial agriculture, aiding the other Anti-Urbanisation policies.

== Broader context ==
These policies reflected wider colonial attitudes in Africa. African urban areas were underfunded, poorly planned, and lacked basic services. Despite this, Africans adapted and gradually built up urban populations through resilience and migration.
