= Rwubusisi =

Rwandan chief and noble (c. 1880–1955)

Chief of Bwishaza
- In office 1905–1912
- Monarch: Yuhi V Musinga

Chief of Buriza
- In office c. 1914
- Monarch: Yuhi V Musinga

Chief of Buriza and Buganza-sud
- In office 1929–1955
- Monarchs: Yuhi V Musinga; Mutara III Rudahigwa

Personal details
- Born: 1880 Rwahi, Bumbogo, Kingdom of Rwanda
- Died: 12 November 1955 (aged 74–75) Kingdom of Rwanda (Ruanda-Urundi)
- Children: 8

Military service
- Allegiance: Kingdom of Rwanda
- Branch/service: Royal Rwandan Army
- Commands: Inkemba
- Battles/wars: Ndungutse's rebellion World War I

Rwubusisi (c. 1880–1955), baptismal name Joseph, was a Rwandan noble and chief belonging to the Tutsi Bega clan. He was an influential figure during the reign of Yuhi V Musinga, and defended the latter's regime during Ndungutse's rebellion. Alongside other relatives, he was one of the dominant politicians in the Kingdom of Rwanda, and able to retain his power throughout the periods of German and Belgian colonial occupation. In his later years, Rwubusisi was highly respected as a mediator between rival factions at the royal court.

== Biography ==
=== Early career and Ndungutse's rebellion ===
Rwubusisi was born to Cyigenza and Nyirinyanja in Rwahi, Bumbogo, around 1880. He belonged to the Bakagara lineage and the noble Bega clan, a Tutsi family which formed part of the elite of the Kingdom of Rwanda. He was a brother of Rwidegembya and Kampayana, as well as the nephew of Kabare and Queen Kanjogera. As a result, he benefitted when a group of Bega nobles led by Kanjogera, Kabare and Ruhinankiko overthrew King Mibambwe IV Rutarindwa in Rucunshu Coup of 1896 and installed Kanjogera's son Yuhi V as monarch. Through Kanjogera, Rwubusisi was the new king's cousin. He became "moderately wealthy" and enjoyed his relatives' protection during the next decades. In this period, Rwanda was also colonized by Germany, though the Germans opted for an indirect rule through Yuhi V.

From 1905 until 1912, Rwubusisi served as the chief of Bwishaza. In 1912, several armed opposition groups in northern Rwanda united under the leadership of an alleged prince, Ndungutse, and organized a major rebellion against Yuhi V. Eventually, the German colonial authorities agreed to support a counter-insurgency campaign by the royal loyalists. Rwubusisi co-commanded this operation alongside German Schutztruppe officer Eberhard Gudowius, commanding 3,000 royal warriors including the inkemba elite troops. The campaign resulted in the defeat of the rebels, and was followed by brutal punitive measures. Rwubusisi and his warriors played a major role in these efforts against the northern civilian population. One last pocket of resistance remained in the region's swamps, overseen by a Twa leader named Basebya. The latter was eventually betrayed by one of his followers who informed the Rwandan court of his hiding place. Rwubusisi then coaxed Basebya out of his stronghold by feigning interest in a peaceful solution and offering to negotiate. When the rebel met with the Bega noble, however, four disguised Schutztruppe askari revealed their guns, seized the rebel, and drove his bodyguards away. Basebya was subsequently executed.

=== World War I and Belgian rule ===
Rwanda was a site of fighting during World War I's East African campaign, with the Rwandan royal army contributing to the German war effort by deploying the Indugaruga contingent. By this time, Rwubusisi served as chief of the Buriza region, and he alongside another chief, Nturo, often visited the Indugaruga troops in Gatsibo District, offering "moral support". He was also responsible for a Indugaruga section, and thus later deemed to be a Indugaruga veteran. The Germans were defeated by the Begians in 1916 and driven from Rwanda, causing the royal court to eventually surrender. Some Indugaruga of Rwubusisi assisted the Belgians in securing Gatsibo.

As Yuhi V had been close to the previous German administration, the new Belgian overlords temporarily jailed him to demonstrate their power. This was an extremely humiliating event for a Rwandan monarch, and greatly impressed the Rwandan nobles who learned of it. Accordingly, Rwubusisi, his brother Rwidegembya, and their cousin Kayondo quickly tried to arrange themselves with the Belgians and offered themselves as loyal subjects, hoping to increase their power as the royal court's status was seemingly in decline. This development was resented by Yuhi V. In 1917, the king managed to restore some of his power through a series of political maneuvers. Among other efforts, he ordered the arrests of Rwubusisi, Rwidegembya, and Kayondo as they had grown too powerful. Conversely, the monarch merely intended to discipline, not to destroy, these Bega nobles as they were still his relatives and potential allies. He thus released them after they had spent several months in prison. Rwubusisi, Rwidegembya, and Kayondo were pardoned by Yuhi V who accepted "their humble pledges of renewed obedience".

In course of the next years of the Belgian administration, Rwubusisi prospered and was given several awards by the Belgian authorities. He was also the most-photographed chief of the Belgian colonial period. Meanwhile, tensions developed between the king and a diverse group of nobles who had fallen from his favor or were opposed to him; they became known as the Inshongore. As the latter sought European protection and support, they became rather influential despite their problematic relations with the monarchy. As the conflict between the court and the Inshongore escalated, most nobles tried to stay out of the disputes. Rwubusisi was the only leading noble who managed to stay neutral and also arbitrate among the infighting groups. Regarding his activities in this period, historian Alison Des Forges described Rwubusisi "as a man of rare integrity and foresight who earned the respect of both groups by refusing to tolerate rumors and secret accusations". He attempted to reunite the different factions by repeatedly organizing mediation attempts, yet these efforts ultimately failed.

From 1929 to his death, Rwubusisi served as the chief of Buriza and Buganza-sud. Deeply attached to the traditional Rwandan culture, he was one of a small number of chiefs who kept the amasunzu hairstyle. Furthermore, he only converted to Roman Catholic Christianity (with the baptismal name "Joseph") toward the end of his life. He died on 12 November 1955.

== Family ==
Rwubusisi had five wives and eight children. Through his older brother Kampayana, he was the great-uncle of Rwandan President Paul Kagame.
