= Rwandan nationality law =

Rwandan Nationality Code

Parliament of Rwanda
- Long title: Loi organique No. 30/2008 du 25 juillet 2008 portant code de la nationalité rwandaise
- Enacted by: Government of Rwanda
- Status: Current legislation

Rwandan nationality law is regulated by the Constitution of Rwanda, as amended; the Nationality Code of Rwanda (French: Code de la nationalité rwandaise), and its revisions; the Law of Persons and Family; and various international agreements to which the country is a signatory. These laws determine who is, or is eligible to be, a national of Rwanda. The legal means to acquire nationality, formal legal membership in a nation, differ from the domestic relationship of rights and obligations between a national and the nation, known as citizenship.

Nationality describes the relationship of an individual to the state under international law, whereas citizenship is the domestic relationship of an individual within the nation. In law, the terms are distinct and they are regulated by different governmental administrative bodies. Rwandan nationality is typically obtained under the principle of jus sanguinis, i.e. by birth in Rwanda or abroad to parents with Rwandan nationality. It can be granted to persons with an affiliation to the country, or to a permanent resident who has lived in the country for a given period of time through naturalization.

== Acquisition of nationality ==
Nationality can be acquired in Rwanda through birth or later in life through naturalization.

=== By birth ===
Since 2004, children in Rwanda have been able to acquire nationality equally, from either parent. People who acquire nationality from birth include:

- Persons born anywhere to at least one parent who is a Rwandan national;
- Persons born in Rwanda who are of unknown nationality; or
- Foundlings or orphans born in the territory of unknown parentage.

=== By naturalization ===
Naturalization can be granted to persons of the age of majority who have resided in the territory for a sufficient period of time to confirm they understand the customs and traditions of the society. General provisions are that applicants be of good character, have no criminal convictions that resulted in incarceration for six months or more and that they are able to be economically self-sufficient. Nationality may also be granted for service to the nation or under exceptional circumstances. The general residency requirement is five years, but exceptions can be made for individuals who have performed exemplary services to the nation, who must confirm a two-year residency. Besides foreigners meeting the criteria, other persons who may be naturalized include:

- Children born in Rwanda to foreign parents or stateless children born in Rwanda may choose to acquire Rwandan nationality, without any discretion of the authorities, upon reaching majority if they can verify that their parents were legal residents of the country;
- Adoptees who are minors and who have been legally adopted acquire nationality at the completion of the process;
- A minor child is automatically naturalized upon the naturalization of their Rwandan parent; or
- The spouse of a Rwandan national after a duration of marriage of three years; or (Note: Though Rwanda requires civil monogamous marriage, the country recognizes marriages lawfully performed under the laws of other jurisdictions. Thus, customary marriages performed and meeting the requirements of a foreign state are considered legal marriages in Rwanda.)
- Persons of Rwandan origin and their descendants, upon acquiring a presidential authorization.

== Loss of nationality ==
Rwandans may renounce their nationality, provided that comply with an administrative processes. Rwandans of origin cannot be deprived of their nationality. Naturalized persons can be denaturalized for or for fraud, misrepresentation, or concealment in a naturalization petition; or for committing crimes against the state or state security. Persons who were denaturalized under previous laws are allowed to repatriate, unless they were deprived of nationality because of a threat to the state or acquired a dual nationality after having been naturalized.

== Dual nationality ==
Rwanda has allowed dual nationality in principle from 1993 at the conclusion of the Rwandan Civil War and in practice since 2003.

== History ==
=== Kingdom of Rwanda (1600–1890) ===
The peoples with the longest history in the region were the Twa, who were known for pottery and hunting. Hutu people migrated to the area around 1000 B.E.E. and engaged in farming. The Hutu over centuries developed a political system based upon highly centralized governance and engaged in farming. Waves of cattle-raising Tutsi moved south into the region from the fifteenth to sixteenth centuries. A series of villages in the northeastern part of the country came to be governed by Tutsi chiefs whose warriors and attendants competed for lands controlled by the chief. In the fifteen century, these chiefdoms merged into a centralized Kingdom of Rwanda around Lake Muhazi, near Kigali. Over the course of several centuries, the kingdom expanded by taking over smaller independent chieftainships in the region. Under the king, society was organized in a feudal system in which the king had ultimate authority and his subjects were those who lived in his territory. Feudal allegiance bound subjects to the ruler by a scheme of protection and service tied to property. The system was called ubuhake, a concept of mutual relationships, in which a patron provided cattle or land and security in return for a peasant's loyalty and uburetwa, work and services due to the patron. The peasant did not own the cattle or land, but instead was entitled to the milk and calves or the use of the pastures, similar to a tenancy.

By the latter nineteenth century, European powers were scrambling to control trade and colonize Africa. In an effort to define their spheres of influence and solve boundary disputes, the Conference of 1884–1885 of 1884–1885 was held in Berlin. Under the terms of an 1886 Anglo-German Agreement Britain and Germany had agreed to terms for the territory between the Ruvuma and Tana Rivers, but left assignment of the territory west of Lake Victoria undefined. This led to continuing tensions as European powers tried to restrict rivals from trading in their sphere. In 1890 Germany and Britain concluded the Heligoland-Zanzibar Treaty, which gave Germany control of all territory from the southern tip of Lake Victoria to the northern tip of Lake Tanganyika in exchange for British control of the area between Lake Victoria and the Congo River. Specifically, Germany gained the island of Heligoland in the North Sea, the Caprivi Strip, and the territory of Ruanda-Urundi in exchange for renouncing claims to, Kenya, Uganda and Zanzibar.

=== German East Africa (1890–1922) ===
In 1892, Oscar Baumann, an Austrian explorer and the first European in the territory, arrived in Rwanda as part of a German antislavery group, to evaluate the geography and economic potential of the area. In 1893, Gustav Adolf von Götzen led an expedition accompanied by Georg von Prittwitz und Gaffron and Hermann Kersting, which reached Rwanda the following year. In 1894 the German government established German East Africa, including parts of present-day Burundi, Rwanda, and Tanzania as a formal colony under its protection. In 1896, troops from the Belgian Congo invaded Rwanda, establishing a post at Shangi and sparking a succession crisis between factions in the Kingdom of Rwanda. After a palace revolt, Yuhi V Musinga became king and was enthroned in 1897. Shortly after his installation, Hans von Ramsay arrived hoping to open Rwanda to German commerce and successfully negotiated a treaty with Musinga to establish a protectorate over the area, gaining rights to trade in exchange for protection against the Belgians. In 1899, the Germans began their first settlement in the territory, when a German military post was established at Shangi by Heinrich von Bethe. That year, Rwanda officially became part of German East Africa.

Under the terms of the German Colonial Act of 1888, German colonies were not part of the federal union, but they were also not considered foreign. Thus, laws that were extended to the colonies sometimes treated residents as nationals and other times as foreigners. German law applied to those subjects who had been born in Germany. Native subjects in the colonies were not considered to be German, but were allowed to naturalize. Naturalization required ten years residence in the territory and proof of self-employment. It was automatically bestowed upon all members of a family, meaning children and wives derived the nationality of the husband. The Nationality Law of 1913 changed the basis for acquiring German nationality from domicile to patrilineality, but did not alter derivative nationality. In 1916 during World War I, the Germans were forced to withdraw and the Belgian forces established a military occupation. Three years after the Treaty of Versailles was signed in 1919, Ruanda-Urundi became a League of Nations mandated territory, under the authority of Belgium.

=== Belgian trust territory (1922–1962) ===
The mandate for Ruanda-Urundi was established on 20 July 1922. For administrative purposes, Belgium assigned the administration of the territory to the Governor-General of the Belgian Congo. On 21 August 1925, the Belgian Parliament passed a Bill for the Government of Ruanda-Urundi, which stipulated that though administered by the Governor-General of the Belgian Congo, Ruanda-Urundi was to be on an equal footing with the Congo and was to remain autonomous. With regard to the nationality of the inhabitants of the territory, the 1925 bill stipulated that Ruandan-Rundi natives were neither subjects, nationals, nor citizens of Belgium, but remained subjects of their respective native chiefs. Persons who were Belgian nationals domiciled in the colonies followed Belgian law, which required descent from a Belgian father and unity of nationality for members of a family. From 1932, a wife or child could refuse automatic acquisition of nationality by making a formal declaration. In the case of a wife, her declaration had to be made within six months of marriage and in the case of a child, before reaching the age of twenty-three.

The colonial administration transplanted tens of thousands of the inhabitants of Ruanda-Urundi to the North Kivu area of Belgian Congo to work on agricultural plantations and as miners. They were given identity cards upon arrival in Congo, because they had no nationality, but no agreement between the two areas addressed the question of nationality. However, under the Section 5 of the Belgian Congo Civil Code of 1892 children born within Congo whose parents were foreigners, but domiciled in Congo for a specified period when the child was born were Congolese, as were children born to foreigners in Congo who chose to naturalize at the age of majority. From 1937 to the mid-1950s, under a program known as the Banyarwanda Immigration Mission (French: Mission d'immigration des Banyarwanda), forced migrations took place because of overpopulation and famine in Ruanda-Urundi.

At the end of World War II the United Nations modified the mandates and established Trust Territories. Belgium continued to administrate Ruanda-Urundi from Léopoldville with separated institutions for Congo and Ruanda-Urundi. Initial plans were for Ruanda-Urundi to emerge from the trusteeship as a single state. To that end, a royal decree was issued on 14 July 1952 to reorganize the territory. Under its terms, the head of state (mwami) remained hereditary and had the authority to appoint chiefs and petty chiefs, but the Governor-General had the right to veto his actions. Though the monarchy was changed by the decree, the mwami retained the power to issue laws to provide for governance and policing without democratic input from his subjects, however, he was bound to consult with the newly established native councils. When Congo gained independence in 1960, there was confusion regarding the status of the imported laborers from Ruanda-Urundi, which would remain an issue of conflict. Failure to negotiate a union, resulted in a UN resolution 1746 (XVI) on 27 June 1962, decreeing two separate states would become independent.

=== Post-independence (1962–present) ===
Rwanda gained its independence on 1 July 1962 as a republic, having held a referendum in 1961 which abolished the monarchy. The Constitution at independence contained in Article 6 a provision that nationality would be defined by law. A Nationality Code was developed in 1963, however, it did not provide provisions to acquire nationality for residents of the country prior to independence. The first nationality statute was based upon the Belgian Nationality Code. Those born after independence could obtain nationality through descent from a father who was Rwandan, or from a mother, if the father was unknown or stateless and the child was illegitimate. Legitimate children born to a Rwandan mother and foreign father could choose to become Rwandan upon reaching their majority, if they had not acquired nationality from their father and if they had established a minimum three-year residency in Rwanda. Foreign women who married Rwandans automatically acquired the nationality of their spouse unless they specifically refused. Foundlings were assumed to be Rwandan of origin and children who had been legally adopted by a Rwandan father, acquired his nationality. Foreigners could naturalize after a ten-year residency and dual nationality was prohibited.

At the end of the Rwandan Civil War, the Arusha Accords, which specified the peace terms were drafted in 1993. One of the chapters, "Protocol on the Repatriation of Rwandese Refugees and the Resettlement of Displaced Persons", established the rights of Rwandan refugees to return to the country. Under its terms, refugees were allowed to return and live where they chose within the country without conditions, as long as they were respectful of the rights of others. The protocol accepted the principal of dual nationality, though called for specific legislation to be drafted. A new government came into being in 1994, after the Rwandan genocide, which began a series of legal reforms for the country. As a result, in 2003, a new constitution was adopted. Under its provisions, dual nationality was permitted. Other constitutional changes included that Rwandans or origin could not be deprived of their nationality, nor prohibited from changing their nationality. It specified that persons who had been deprived of nationality because they acquired dual nationality between 1 November 1959 and 31 December 1994 could reacquire Rwandan nationality by resettling in the country. The 1994 Constitution also allowed any person who had origins in Rwanda, or their descendants the right to acquire Rwandan nationality.

In 2004, a new Nationality Code was drafted which eliminated gender discrimination in the statute allowing men and women to equally pass their nationality to their children or spouse. While retaining provisions for foundlings to acquire nationality, the new Code expanded its allocations permitting children born in Rwanda to stateless parents to obtain nationality at birth and those who were born in the territory to foreign parents to acquire nationality at majority. It allowed both minor children and adults adopted by Rwandans to acquire nationality. The residency period for naturalization was reduced to five years. A new Nationality Code was promulgated in 2008. While predominantly similar to the 2004 Code, changes included elimination of the provision for adult adoption and for automatic re-acquisition of nationality, instead implementing an administrative process. It also established a centralized nationality administration under the Directorate General of Immigration and Emigration. In 2015 a new constitution was drafted, but it made only slight changes to nationality rules. It reaffirmed that Rwandans have a right to nationality and dual nationality; cannot be banished from Rwanda or deprived of their Rwandan original nationality; and if they are Rwandan of origin, they and their descendants have a right to acquire Rwandan nationality. the Law of Persons and Family (No. 32/2016) adopted on 28 August 2016 also complements nationality legislation in Rwanda, as do international and regional conventions to which the country is a signatory.
