= Mutara III Rudahigwa =

King of Rwanda (1931–1959)

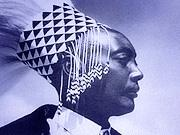
- Mutara III, c. 1931–1959

Mwami of Rwanda
- Reign: 16 November 1931 – 25 July 1959
- Predecessor: Yuhi V Musinga
- Successor: Kigeli V Ndahindurwa
- Born: March 1911; Cyangugu, Kingdom of Rwanda
- Died: 25 July 1959 (aged 48); Usumbura, Ruanda-Urundi
- Burial: Nyanza District
- Spouse: Nyiramakomali (m. 1933; div. 1941) Rosalie Gicanda (after 1942)
- Clan: Abanyiginya
- Father: Yuhi V Musinga
- Mother: Radegonde Nyiramavugo III Kankazi
- Religion: Roman Catholicism

Mutara III Rudahigwa (March 1911 – 25 July 1959) was King (umwami) of Rwanda between 1931 and 1959. He was the first Rwandan king to bring Catholicism to the country, being baptised Charles Léon Pierre. He is thus sometimes referred to as Charles Mutara III Rudahigwa.

== Early life and education ==
Rudahigwa was born in March 1911, in Nyanza, the royal capital of Rwanda, to King Yuhi V Musinga, and Queen Kankazi (later Queen Mother Radegonde Nyiramavugo III Kankazi), the first of his eleven wives. He was a member of the Tutsi Abanyiginya clan.

In 1919 he began his education at the Colonial School for Chiefs' Sons in Nyanza, subsequently becoming his father's secretary in 1924. In January 1929 he was appointed a chief and administered a province.

== Reign ==
Rudahigwa acceded to the Rwandan throne on 16 November 1931, four days after the Belgian colonial administration deposed his father, Yuhi V Musinga for alleged contact with German agents. Rudahigwa took the regnal name Mutara, and after his baptism as Charles Léon Pierre, he is sometimes referred to in full as Charles Mutara III Rudahigwa.

In 1943, Rudahigwa was the first Rwandan king to convert to Catholicism. His father had refused to convert: the Rwandan Catholic Church saw him as an anti-Christian impediment to their civilising mission. From 1929, Rudahigwa had been instructed in Christianity by Bishop Léon Classe of the Apostolic Vicariate of Ruanda, and groomed by the Belgians to replace his father. In 1946, Rudahigwa dedicated the country to Jesus Christ, effectively making Christianity the kingdom’s state religion. His conversion spearheaded a wave of baptisms in the protectorate.

His reign coincided with the worst recorded period of famine in Rwanda between 1941 and 1945, which included the Ruzagayura famine (1943–1944), during which time 200,000 out of the nation's population of around two million perished.

=== Rising ethnic tensions ===
During Rudahigwa's reign there was a marked stratification of ethnic identity within Ruanda-Urundi, the Belgian-ruled mandate of which Rwanda formed the northern part. In 1935, the Belgian administration issued identity cards formalising the ethnic categories, Tutsi, Hutu and Twa. After World War II, a Hutu emancipation movement began to grow throughout Ruanda-Urundi, fueled by increasing resentment of the interwar social reforms, and also an increasing sympathy for the Hutu within the Catholic Church. Although in 1954, Rudhahigwa abolished the ubuhake system of indentured service that exploited Hutus, this had little real practical effect.

The monarchy and prominent Tutsi sensed the growing influence of the Hutu and began to agitate for immediate independence on their own terms, culminating in Rudahigwa's demand for independence from Belgium in 1956. In 1957, a group of Hutu scholars wrote the Bahutu Manifesto. This political manifesto denounced the "exploitation" of the Hutus by the ethnic Tutsi and called for their liberation from first Tutsi, and then Belgian, rule. Hutu political parties quickly formed after that, with future-president Gregoire Kayibanda forming the Hutu Social Movement (soon renamed MDR-PARMEHUTU), and Joseph Gitera creating Association for Social Promotion of the Masses (APROSOMA).

=== Death ===
On 24 July 1959, Rudahigwa arrived in Usumbura (now Bujumbura), Urundi, for a meeting with Belgian colonial authorities arranged by Father André Perraudin. The following day, he visited his Belgian doctor at the colonial hospital, where he suddenly died. Belgian authorities put out conflicting explanations for Rudahigwa’s death: one said he complained of a severe headache and upon treatment by his doctor, the king collapsed as he left the hospital of what was later determined, by three doctors, to be a cerebral haemorrhage. Another Belgian explanation was that he died from an adverse reaction to a penicillin shot. An autopsy was not done after objections from Queen Mother Kankazi.

Rumours that he had been deliberately killed by the Belgian authorities were rife, and tensions rose: ordinary Rwandans gathered along routes and stoned Europeans' cars. Rumours that he was in poor health, suffering from the effects of excessive drinking, as well as the effects of untreated syphilis, are claims unverified by any evidence. A Twa attendant of the king said he was in great health at the time, which is supported by his active engagement in sporting activities then, including vigorous games of tennis.

Rudahigwa was succeeded by his half-brother, Jean-Baptiste Ndahindurwa, as Kigeli V.

== Personal life ==
Mutara III married Nyiramakomali on 15 October 1933 and they divorced in 1941. He married Rosalie Gicanda, a Christian, in a church wedding on 13 January 1942.

After Mutara III died, Queen Dowager Rosalie Gicanda remained in Butare. She was among those killed in the 1994 genocide against the Tutsi on the orders of Ildéphonse Nizeyimana. He was later detained, convicted by a UN war crimes court, and sentenced to life imprisonment.

In 1953, the American writer John Gunther interviewed Mutara III in preparation for his book Inside Africa. In this work, Mutara III was described as a sombre and sober person, lean and handsome in appearance, and six foot nine inches in height. He spoke excellent French, and professed loyalty to Belgium and indifference to the United Nations trusteeship of that period.

== Honours ==
Styles of Mutara III Rudahigwa
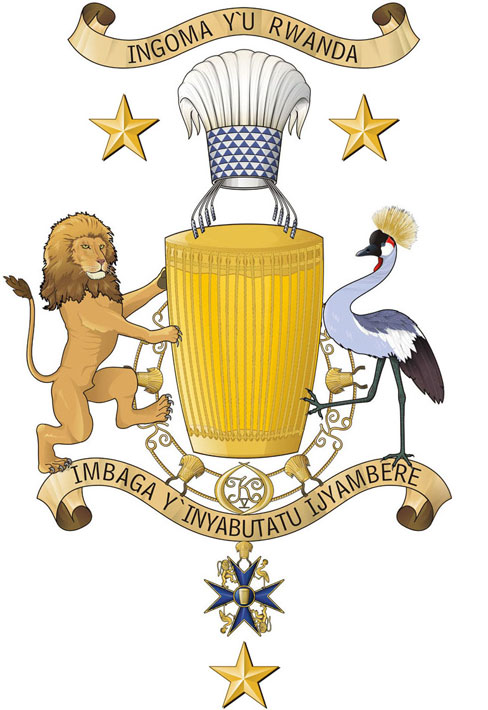
- Reference style: His Majesty
- Spoken style: Your Majesty

National

- Grand Master and Grand Cross of the Royal Order of the Lion (Intare), founded 1959

Foreign

- (Belgium) Grand Cross of the Belgian Order of Leopold II, 1955, Commander 1947
- (Vatican City) Knight Grand Cross of the Order of St. Gregory the Great, 1947 through Archbishop Giovanni Battista Dellepiane, Apostolic Delegate to Democratic Republic of Congo.

== Ancestry ==
Ancestors of Mutara III Rudahigwa

8. Mutara II Rwogera
4. Kigeli IV Rwabugiri
9. Nyirakigeri IV Murorunkwere
2. Yuhi V Musinga
10. Rwakagara
5. Nyirayuhi V Kanjogera
1. Mutara III Rudahigwa
6. Mbanzabigyi
3. Radegonde Nyiramavugo III Kankazi

Regnal titles
Preceded by Yuhi V Musinga	King of Rwanda; 1931–1959	Succeeded by Kigeli V Ndahindurwa
