= Archaeology of Rwanda =

Rwanda's prehistory is a relatively unexplored concept as compared to other regions of Africa. Most archaeological works regarding Rwanda past 1994 are associated with conflict and ethnic violence. However more recently, archaeologists have been attempting to focus on archaeological works from the first and second millennia A.D. For example, some archaeological research has been focusing on the Nyiginya Kingdom, which is the pre-colonial predecessor of the current Rwandan state. Other research has been focusing on the excavations of the earliest agricultural sites, likely from the Iron Age, as well as ceramics to indicate chronology of when certain agricultural groups migrated to Rwanda.

== The Urewe culture of Rwanda ==
The Urewe culture first settled the Rwanda-Burundi Central Plateau during the first millennium BC but takes its name from a site in Kenya. The Urewe culture demonstrates the earliest occurrences of many practices in Rwanda, such as iron smelting and pottery. The Urewe culture is known for its distinct iron smelting processes, as well as highly decorative pottery. Archaeologists generally believe that the Urewe culture had a mixed farming economy. The significance of the Urewe culture is that it provided the oldest evidence of an Early Iron Age (EIA) civilization south of the equator. The Urewe culture is also responsible for the spread of EIA cultures and agriculture eastwards to southeast Africa by 800 AD. Most Urewe sites that are from the first millennium AD are near or in heavily populated areas such as cities today.

Prior to the rise of the Urewe culture, previous cultures were based on stone technologies. The lack of stone technologies at Urewe sites may indicate that Urewe peoples had limited contact with the earlier cultures that inhabited the Great Lakes region. The Urewe peoples are considered to be a mix of hunter-gatherers and agriculturalists.There is a lack of “faunal remains of hunting and fishing” at EIA sites in Rwanda. However, the location of Urewe settlements near savannas and the edges of forests indicates that Urewe peoples probably gathered foods such as fruits, berries, and edible roots. in Late Iron Age (LIA) sites in Rwanda (Akameru and Cyinkomane) dating to the ninth century AD, “bones of wild game were mixed with those of domestic animals and roulette-decorated pots.” The hilly areas of Rwanda and Burundi were appealing for agricultural settlement by Urewe peoples. The landscape is open and bordered by the savanna and forests. The vast forests providing wood and iron ore deposits allowed iron smelting to occur. The presence of clay soils allowed for the production of Urewe ceramics.

=== Evidence of early Iron Age farming ===
Three archaeological sites at Kabuye Hill in Rwanda provide the best direct evidence for agriculture in the EIA. Pollen analyses were conducted at each site. At Kabuye IV, a furnace crucible from 240 to 400 AD shows the earliest evidence of iron smelting at this region. Kabuye III has a crucible dating to 420-600 AD and Kabuye II has a crucible dating to 560-690 AD. The sample from Kabuye II was taken from a sealed pot at the base of the crucible. Cereal pollens were found at all three sites. Traces of finger millet pollen was found in the Kabuye IV sample, although it only made up a small percentage of the total pollen found. Similarly, finger millet pollen was present in Kabuye III and II; all three of these sites span from the third to the seventh centuries AD. Kabuye IV and II also had a small percentage of sorghum pollen found. The small percentages of cereal pollens found at all three sites indicate that cereal crops were not intensely farmed at a large scale at Urewe sites, but rather that small and individual plots were used instead.The presence of both of the aforementioned cereal crops is significant. They were “not domesticated in Rwanda or Burundi”. These crops were most likely brought into Rwanda and surrounding Great Lakes settlements via members of the Urewe culture.

=== Urewe burials ===
Research was conducted on an Early Iron Age burial site in Kabusanze, Rwanda, that contained the skeletal remains of two people. The burial site also contained “Urewe ceramics, iron adornments and an exotic artefact, which have been radiocarbon dated by association with wood charcoal to c. 400 AD.” Archaeobotanical analyses conducted at the burial pits found “wild and domesticated charred seed remains.” Traces of sorghum, cowpea, and pearl millet were found in the two pits. The discovery of these cereal crops is important in providing further evidence of the domestication and cultivation of cereal crops in Rwanda during the first millennium AD. There was scarce evidence of this kind before. “Classic Urewe ceramics” were found in both burial pits.

==== The Kabusanze burial ====
The burial contained an adult and a neonate. The adult's remains were found at the “base of the burial pit, approximately 2.5m beneath the current land surface, whilst the neonate was encountered 0.5m above the adult”. The adult remains were surrounded by Classical Urewe ceramics, iron, and shell artefacts. Bulk soil samples taken from the burial found wood charcoal and the charred remains of wild flowers. Only fragments of the adult's cranium remained (mandible, maxilla, left and right zygomatic bones.” Of the post-cranial skeletal, fragments of ribs, vertebrae, and parts of a right humerus remained. Using the remaining dentition present (fully grown molars), it was confirmed that the skeleton deeper in the burial pit was an adult.The mandible of the skeleton was scored by the archaeologists as being a 4 on a scale of 1-5, where a 5 means that features are strongly male. The skeleton was then seen as being a “large and robust adult male.”

"The human skeleton discovered in the lower part of the burial represents a large adult male. The elements of this adult skeleton discovered within the pit are well preserved and the absence of the rest of the skeleton therefore requires further explanation. One possibility is differential preservation within the burial pit. However, the missing elements of the skeleton include the bones of the pelvis and the legs. These represent some of the largest and strongest bones in the human skeleton and it seems unlikely that small fragments of ribs would be preserved within the burial pit and not parts of these larger bones. In addition, the partial humerus is extremely well preserved but none of the other long bones of the arm were discovered. The depth of the deposit also means that the bones are unlikely to have been disturbed post burial. An alternative explanation is that only selected parts of the skeleton were buried. This is supported by the presence of cut marks on the humerus, as well as by a possible peri-mortem fracture on the shaft of the humerus. These findings provide strong evidence for the practice of secondary burial at Kabusanze and are also possible indications of violence and/or dismemberment of the body prior to burial."

The neonate skeleton most likely died at around the time of birth. The skeleton was well-preserved and contained most bones besides dentition.

===== Iron objects =====
Two collections of iron objects were found. In the first collection, a small pot with six iron beads and a potentially broken bracelet were found. In the second collection (found right next to the adult human's remains), two bracelets, a necklet, and a hollow disc were found. As Giblin and colleagues explain, “The results of the metallographic investigation carried out on the two objects suggest that a significant amount of time and technical skill was used to form and manipulate the shapes of these objects.”

It was well understood by archaeologists that much iron was being produced in southern Rwanda and the Great Lakes region in general. Archaeologists are attempting to confirm if the source of this iron is either local or if it was obtained through trade networks.

Ironsmiths in Rwanda during the first millennium AD used furnaces made of decorated clay bricks. However, the products of these furnaces are rare until the analysis is conducted at this site. There are two reasons for this: Rwanda's wet climate which corrodes metals and the recycling of iron into different products by ironsmiths (which leaves relatively no iron discarded). Archaeometallurgical analyses conducted on the iron objects found at Kabusanze suggest that one or more skilled ironsmiths made these objects. The analyses also indicate that the ironsmiths were capable of forging the iron "long strands and then into symmetrical circles." The artisans were able to use complex techniques to forge these jewelry pieces. The presence of iron in the first millennium AD in Rwanda suggests that iron was prized not just for practical usages, but also for "bodily adornment."

==== Urewe burial pots ====
One complete and ten incomplete Classic Urewe artifacts were found next to the adult's skeletal remains. Ten of the items “were made of a single dark reddish/black fabric with a fine-grained matrix containing rare quartz and mica inclusions.” In the collection of Urewe burial pots, “four jars, two shouldered collared bowls, two flared mouth bowls, one open bowl, one hemispherical bowl and one small complete pot” were found. All of the pots (except the small pot) had two to four bevels; each pot (except the open bowl) was decorated and included “circular motifs, cross-hatching and horizontal bands." The small pot was found on top of burnt wood and charcoal; the inside of the pot had “a shell bead, four iron beads and the possible remains of an iron bracelet”. The small pot also had three evenly-spaced openings under the rim of the pot. These openings have been found in other first millennium AD sites in southern Zambia and also contained iron artifacts within them. These small pots may have been suspended using the three openings and then used for rituals. Urewe pottery is clearly shown to have both functional capabilities, as well as symbolic and ritual capacities.

==== Other discoveries at the Kabusanze burial ====
A cowrie shell, a quartz blade, and six shell beads were found next to the adult's remains. The cowrie shell is of particular interest to archaeologists since cowrie is only naturally found in coastal areas. This indicates that the shell may have been brought to the landlocked Kabusanze site in a kind of long-distance trade. Evidence from the second millennium AD in the Great Lakes region shows cowrie shells in sites like Kibiro and Ntusi in Uganda, as well as at Tsavo National Park—in both the West and East Tsavo parks—in Kenya; Sanga, Democratic Republic of Congo; and Batoka Plateau, Zambia. The Kabusanze site shows the first direct evidence of long-distance trade in the first millennium AD. However, due to the rarity of cowrie in the Great Lakes region in this time period in general, it can only be assumed that the exchanges for these materials were done amongst individuals and not intensive trading networks.

== Archaeological discoveries from the first and second millennia AD ==
Rwanda has seen minimal archaeobotanical research. Within the last two decades, research of this kind has seen a newfound growth in Rwanda. An archaeological survey was conducted by archaeologists John Giblin and Dorian Fuller in Rwanda from 2006 to 2007 in order to properly understand the prehistory of Rwanda and its agricultural practices. The survey took place in three diverse areas of Rwanda: Butare, southern Rwanda, (known for its strong iron-production in the first and second millennia AD); Gitarama, central Rwanda, (known for being the core of Nyiginya Kingdom); and Ruhengeri, northern Rwanda. Eight sites were excavated in these regions using 1 x 2 m^{2} to 2 x 3 m^{2} excavation units (254) and 32 samples were excavated. All of the paleobotanical samples date to the Iron Age. Three different eras of ceramics users were discovered at these sites as well: Classic Urewe users, Transitional Urewe users, and roulette-decorated users. Classic Urewe users are found at the Kabusanze and Masangano sites. Two pits and one burial that contained Classic Urewe ceramics at Kabuzanze are dated to 400 AD. Transitional Urewe users at the site of Karama in central Rwanda are dated to around 700 AD. A pit fill containing transitional Urewe ceramics was found here. Roulette-decorated users are estimated to be from 1100 AD based on stratigraphical analyses of archaeological deposits found in four cave sites in northern Rwanda.

The map to the right shows the approximate location of some of the sites.

=== Ceramic types ===
The arrival of farming in the Great Lakes region of Africa coincides with the first appearances of Classic Urewe ceramics. Classic Urewe ceramics are considered to be “of a high quality, with a broad vessel form range, limited fabric range and commonly display bevelled rims, dimple-bases and complex incised motifs”. Classic Urewe ceramics are considered to have been in the Great Lakes region from around 500 BC to 800 AD. Generally speaking, Transitional Urewe ceramics have less effort put into them. There is a lack of “complex beveling, dimple-bases and complex incised decorations”. The period in Rwanda in which Transitional Urewe ceramics were made are considered to be associated with climate change and problems with resource exploitation, hence the change in ceramics.

Roulette-decorated ceramics have been in the Great Lakes region from the early second millennium AD. The roulette-decorated ceramics period is associated with “growing subsistence complexity, including the development of specialised pastoralism, agriculture, increasing socio-political centralization” as well as the establishment of kingdoms in ancient Rwanda and surrounding areas. Like Transitional ceramics, roulette-decorated ceramics are simpler than Classic Urewe ceramics. Utility is prized over design. However, some rare roulette-decorated ceramics are of high quality and are associated with elites.

==== Analyses of the discoveries ====
Soil samples, wood charcoal pieces, and seed taxa were analyzed at the sites where these ceramics were found. Radiocarbon dating done on the wood charcoal pieces are consistent with the estimated dates based on the ceramic typology. The seeds of cereals were the most widespread to be found at the sites. Pulse seeds, wild seeds, and tree fruits were also found. At the Kabusanze site, pearl millet and sorghum were found. The club shape of the pearl millet suggests it was domesticated rather than wild. The size of the pearl millet (1.75 mm by 1.07 mm) is similar to domesticated pearl millet found in Jarma, Libya, (a first millennium AD site), as well as Nubian sites and Iron Age Indian sites. Pearl millet interestingly spread from West Africa to the Great Lakes region, and eventually made its way to Southern India; this likely indicates some sort of trade happening between the continents in ancient times.

The discovery of domesticated plant remains in Kabusanze indicate that Classic Urewe users were agricultural and farmed “sorghum, pearl millet, and cowpea”. Linguistic studies suggest that Central/Eastern Sudanic speakers brought pearl millet and sorghum into ancient Rwanda. Pearl millet originated in West Africa, with the earliest evidence of domestication dated to Mali from 2000 to 2400 BC. Sorghum is native to modern Sudan and eastern Chad. The implications of these discoveries are important. Both of these crops were introduced in Rwanda from different regions in Africa; the evidence collected shows that “they had been integrated in east-central African agricultural by at least the mid-first millennium AD”.

Additionally, finger millet cultivation in the late first millennium AD has been identified in accordance with transitional Urewe ceramics found at a site in Karama, Rwanda. Caves in Musanze, Mweru, and Nguri had domesticated finger millet found near roulette-decorated ceramics.

== Nyiginya kingdom ==
The Nyiginya kingdom is the predecessor of the modern state of Rwanda. The emergence of this kingdom is considered by scholars to be somewhere between the 14th and 17th centuries AD, although royal court officials and their passed down rich oral tradition claims that the kingdom emerged in 959 AD. The Nyiginya Kingdom emerged from “agricultural and pastoral communities in… central Rwanda.” (223)

- “By the time the first Europeans arrived in the late 19th century, the kingdom contained highly complex and effective political and ritual institutions, including shifting capitals, armies, craft specialists, a single language, and specialised subsistence practices, including foraging, agriculture, and pastoralism” (223-224)

Before the 1994 Rwandan Genocide, Rwanda was divided racially along three main groupings: the Hutu (85 percent of the population), the Tutsi (14 percent of the population), and the Twa (less than one percent of the population). The Twa, Tutsi and Hutu ethnic identities were important in the Nyiginya Kingdom. Colonial and post-colonial conceptions of Twa, Tutsi, and Hutu were seen as “ethnoracial identities with associated, well-defined, immutable, specialised subsistence orientations”.

Archaeologically speaking, archaeologists in the later 20th century grouped each ethnic group “through the attribution of particular archaeological materials” such as: “subsistence remains, burials, and archaeological ceramics”. The current understanding of these prevalent Rwandan ethnicities are seen as “non-ethnoracial, dynamic, polyvalent, political identities”. In contemporary Rwanda, archaeological discussions on ethnicities have been made illegal by the Rwandan government since discussion of Hutu, Tutsi, and Twa identities are seen as divisive and against national unity.

=== Archaeology of the Nyiginya kingdom ===
Second millennium AD archaeological sites in Rwanda are “usually found on hilltops or hillsides and more rarely in caves or beside lakes and rivers.” Sites are “commonly identified by the surface occurrence of roulette-decorated ceramics, which display twisted cord, knotted-strip, and possible cord-wrapped stick rouletting and evidence of iron production, such as furnace pits, tuyeres, and iron slag”. It is very challenging to accurately date these sites due to a lack of radiocarbon dates. However, some sites from early in the second millennium AD have been properly excavated and dated. One example is the site of Ryamuri in northeast Rwanda. Ryamuri was a “17th century Ndorwa Kingdom capital”. A high volume of ceramics and evidence of subsistence were discovered in 18 large earthwork enclosures.

Other important sites that were excavated are the graves of Nyiginya Kingdom rulers at Remera. The rulers whose bodies and grave goods were excavated are: Cyirima Rujugira, Kigeri Rwabugiri, and Kanjogera. The last two aforementioned rulers were from the 19th and 20th centuries but King Cyirima “died in the 17th century but was not buried immediately” since his successor died early on, complicating Cyirima's burial rites. Cyirima's body and grave goods were kept in a hut until 1931, when the royal court decided to bury him. Cyirima's “burial revealed a wealth of grave goods including, among other things, objects associated with hunting, pastoralism, agriculture, and metal work”. These burial items reveal that Nyiginya Kingdom highly valued the aforementioned economic activities and that they were symbolically related to ones status.

== The official historical and archaeological narrative of the government of Rwanda ==
The Kingdom of Rwanda was established by the Nyiginya Dynasty, an elite Tutsi family, somewhere between the first and second millennium AD. The concepts for Twa, Tutsi, and Hutu were not originally made to be ethnic concepts; they instead described different “subsistence economic classes” such as herders, farmers, foragers etc. Due to this, people in Rwanda could all speak the same language Kinyarwanda, “were able to intermarry, and to enjoy a high degree of social mobility”.

The official narrative depicts that these three subsistence groups lived in harmony until the arrival of the Europeans in the late 19th century. The European colonizers misinterpreted the Twa, Tutsi, and Hutu identities, instead seeing them “to be ethno-racial subsistence classes with varying levels of ethno-racial superiority”. The Tutsi were seen to be the descendants of a Hamitic race from the Nile Valley and Ethiopia that had conquered the Bantu Hutus and Pygmy Twas. The Belgians were blamed for polarizing the fluid social system of Rwanda into one based on race hierarchies: The Belgian colonial administration enacted this polarization via the official census of 1933–1934, which gave every Rwandan an official identity card, detailing, among other things, their specific ethnie, which equated to physical (racial) difference identified through the measurement of particular anatomical features, alongside subsistence practice.”

Map of Belgium's Colonial Empire. Pictured in red to the right of Congo is Ruanda-Urundi.

According to Belgian colonial ideologies, the Tutsi were seen as “racially superior Hamitic colonisers from the northeast” who conquered the inferior Hutus, who themselves had conquered the most inferior Twa. The “Hamitic Myth” was pushed by the Belgians to justify their colonial subjugation of the Rwandan peoples. According to this myth, the Hamites were a “Caucasoid people” who migrated from the Middle East to into Africa and are the true reason for any civilization present. To explain the lack of white people in Rwanda, Belgian authorities claimed that the “Hamites had been corrupted and assimilated with the indigenous Negroid race as they migrated southward”. In order to explain why complex societies existed in Africa, such as those found in Rwanda, the Belgian colonialists claimed that Hamite influence was clearly present in these lands. Due to this myth, preferential status was given to some "races" in Rwanda over others. The ruling Tutsi elites that the Belgians had encountered were tall, had narrow noses, and were fair-skinned. They were likened to be Hamitic descendants who had conquered inferior Hutus (219).

The Hutu majority government established in 1962 was said to enforce the “colonially constructed ethno-racial migration model” to justify persecution of the Tutsi minority, eventually culminating in the 1994 genocide of Tutsis in the country. The current government of Rwanda (led by the Tutsi) has “removed the identities Twa, Tutsi, and Hutu and have replaced them with a single Rwandan national identity”. With the passing of laws against ethnic division and promoting genocide ideology, the Rwandan government has effectively tried to ban the concept of ethnicity in order to prevent what they see as colonially-fueled social cleavages.

=== Concerns about archaeology in Rwanda ===
Past archaeological research in Rwanda before the genocide may have helped to reinforce some notions of colonially constructed “ethnoracial thinking.” As Giblin explains, "This involved the one-to-one association of ‘pygmoid Twa’, ‘Hamitic Tutsi’, and “Bantu Hutu’ identities with human remains based on physiology, archaeological ceramics based on a presumed migratory sequence and subsistence remains based on ethnographic assumptions.”

Today, archaeological works may be considered to be controversial by the Rwandan government if they provide any indication that, for example, the migration patterns, ceramic works, burial practices etc. of the Twa, Hutu, and Tutsi are indicative of ancient ethno-racial identities. Even site location may be considered problematic since it is associated with subsistence, and therefore indirectly with ethnic identity. The identification of human remains for archaeological study in Rwanda can also be a problematic process, if physical features are analyzed and attributed to one of the three ethnic identities.
