= Rwanyanya =

Rwanyanya was a Prince and fifth Son of Mwami Yuhi IV Gahindiro of Kingdom of Rwanda who lived in 19th century. His son was Kananga, the father to notable Rwandan chiefs Tutuba and Kanyemera. Rwanyanya's brother was King Mutara II Rwogera.
