= Yuhi IV Gahindiro =

Mwami (King)
- Reign: 1801 – 1845
- Born: Kingdom of Rwanda
- Died: 1845; Kingdom of Rwanda
- Spouse: Nyiramavugo II Nyiramongi
- Issue: Mutara II Rwogera
- Dynasty: Nyiginya-Hindiro dynasty
- Father: Mibambwe III Mutabazi II Sentabyo (adopted father); Gihana Rurema (biological father)
- Mother: Nyirayuhi IV Nyiratunga

Yuhi IV Gahindiro was the King of Rwanda from 1801 to 1845. He was the head of Bahindiro clan and father of Mutara II Rwogera. His reign is remembered in Rwandan history as the most peaceful. He died with no blood on his hands.

His other recorded children were Nyirindekwe, Nkusi, Rubega, Rwanyanya, Rwayega, Rwabika, Nyabigondo, Nkoronko, Mutijima, Nyamashara, Rubamburamanzi, Mashara and Urujeni. Yuhi IV Gahindiro's mother's name was Nyiratunga. She was in control of the Rwandan Kingdom until her son was old enough to ascend to the throne. Queen Nyiratunga ruled with the help of her brother Rugagi.Together they fended off wars against Kins such as Gatarabuhura who wanted to kill the boy king Gahindiro.

Yuhi IV Gahindiro was one of the four most renowned kings (abami) of the Nyiginya dynasty, alongside Ruganzu Ndoli, Cyilima Rujugira, and Kigeli Rwabugili. He is remembered in Rwandan oral tradition as the monarch who broke the popular proverb “Ak’i Muhana kaza imvura ihise” (“What comes from one’s in-laws arrives after the rain has fallen”). In poetic recitations, upon reaching Gahindiro, the praise line declares: “Gahindiro, son of Nyiratunga—the widow of Gihana Rurema—who bore and nurtured him, and sent him a shield through his first cousin, Mibambwe Sentabyo, from generation to generation.”

Gahindiro’s mother, Queen Nyiratunga, had been the wife of Gihana, son of King Cyirima II Rujugira. Gihana, an uncle to Mibambwe III Sentabyo, was Gahindiro’s biological father. He died in Burundi while serving as an Umutabazi w’umucengeri (a warrior envoy or sacrificial combatant).

Although Gahindiro’s military mobilizations are often highlighted, large-scale troop deployments had already begun during the reign of Cyilima II, when military camps were established in response to a major conflict with Burundi. At the time, the Burundian kingdom sought to overthrow Bucura of Rwaka, who had taken refuge in Rwanda, along with Rugira.

Gahindiro instituted cultural and administrative reforms to the military. Unlike in earlier dynasties, military units were not preserved in perpetuity; instead, they were managed by royal courts or ibisata (parishes). As soldiers aged, they were replaced by their sons. Each camp was a substantial complex, consisting of warriors and their attendants or companions-in-arms, typically organized under at least two leaders, each commanding around 120 combatants.

Yuhi IV Gahindiro is said to have died of old age.

Regnal titles
Preceded by Mibambwe III Mutabazi II Sentabyo	King of Rwanda; 1801–1845	Succeeded by Mutara II Rwogera
