= Kigeli IV Rwabugiri =

Mwami of Rwanda (1840? – 1895)

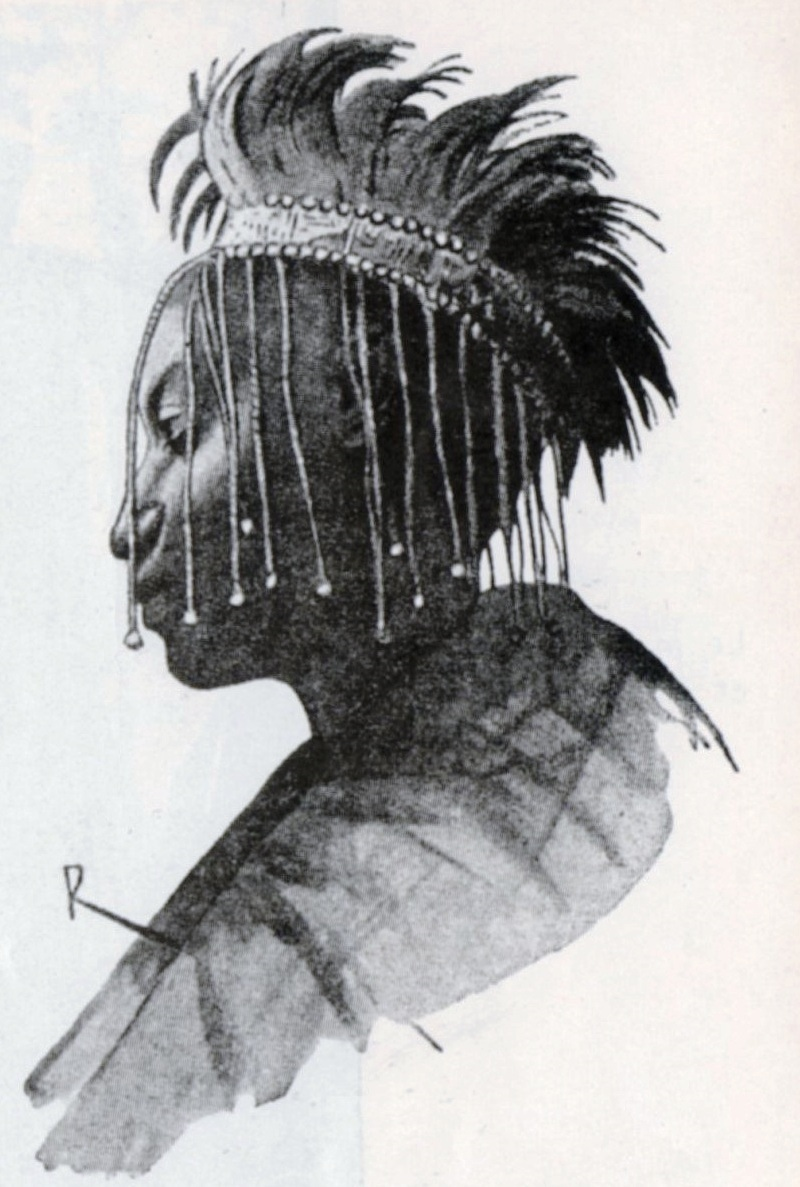
- Kigeli IV

Mwami of Rwanda
- Reign: 1867 – September 1895
- Predecessor: Mutara II Rwogera
- Successor: Mibambwe IV Rutarindwa
- Born: 1840; Kingdom of Rwanda
- Died: September 1895 (aged 54–55); Congo Free State
- Spouse: Kanjogera; Others
- Issue: Yuhi V Musinga
- Clan: Abanyiginya
- Father: Mutara II Rwogera
- Mother: Nyirakigeri Murorunkwere

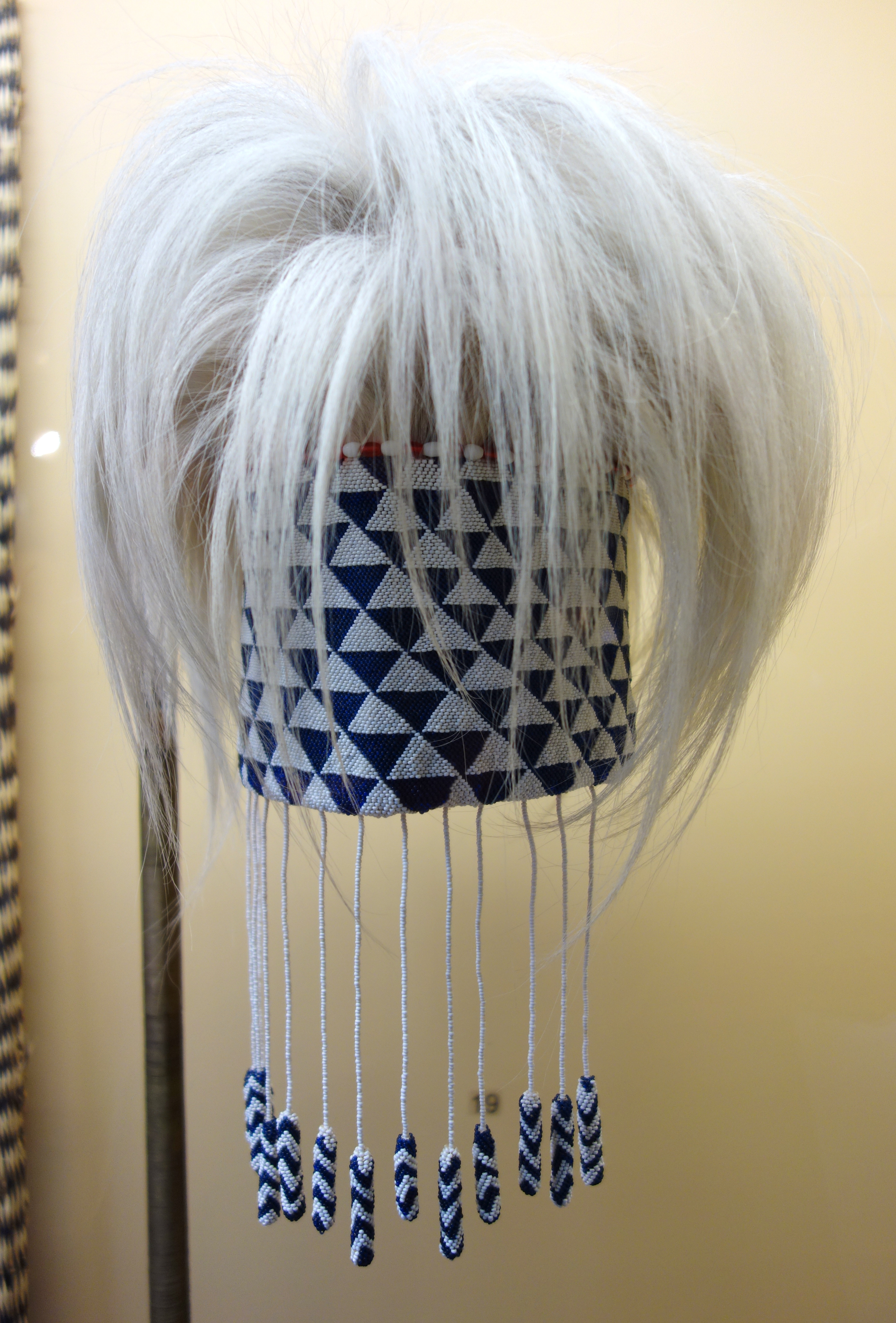
Diadem of Kigeli IV Rwabugiri

Kigeli IV Rwabugiri (1840? – September 1895) was the king (mwami) of the Kingdom of Rwanda in the mid-nineteenth century. He was among the last Nyiginya kings in a ruling dynasty that had traced its lineage back to Gihanga, who is one of the first 'historical' kings of Rwanda whose exploits are celebrated in oral chronicles. He was a Tutsi with the birth name Sezisoni Rwabugiri. He was the first king in Rwanda's history to come into contact with Europeans. He established an army equipped with guns he obtained from Germans and prohibited most foreigners, especially Arabs, from entering his kingdom.

Rwabugiri held authority from 1867 to 1895. He died in September 1895, during an expedition in modern-day Congo, shortly after the arrival of the German explorer Count Gustav Adolf von Götzen. His adopted son, Mibambwe IV Rutarindwa, was proclaimed the next king.

By the end of Rwabugiri's rule, Rwanda was divided into a standardized structure of provinces, districts, hills, and neighborhoods, administered by a hierarchy of chiefs. The chiefs were predominantly Tutsi at the higher levels and with a greater degree of mutual participation by Hutus.

He defended the borders of the Rwandan kingdom against invading neighboring kingdoms, slave traders, and Europeans. Rwabugiri was a warrior king and is regarded as one of Rwanda's most powerful kings. Some Rwandans see him as the last true King of Rwanda due to the tragic assassination of his successor Rutarindwa and coup by his stepmother Kanjogera who installed her son Musinga. By the beginning of the 20th century, Rwanda was a unified state with a centralized military structure.

Rwabugiri is sometimes attributed for the tactics used by the RPF during the Rwandan genocide to retain unity among Rwandans.

== Pre-colonial Rwanda ==
Colonial literature has it that the kingdom of Rwanda was originally occupied by a number of Bantu chieftainships which were conglomerated during the 10th century by Tutsi pastoralists from the North who brought ideas of a political society. By the 19th century, the state had become much more centralized. Rwabugiri established a royal court that collected labor dues and claimed tributary food in Rubengera around 1870. This served the purpose of channeling food across the country and becoming a center of commerce. During periods of food shortages, most of the country would suffer while the very rich Tutsi who resided in Rubengera would be able to find food and livestock. The royal court was prepared for this situation usually, however, and controlled the production of produce as to always create a surplus. This was meant to serve as a famine strategy. This surplus would then be distributed by the king's order to the poorest citizens in exchange for their labor.

== Expansion ==
Ethnicity became an important factor during the period of state expansion that began in the late 19th century. Rwabugiri gained increasing control over land, cattle, and people in Central Africa. Rwabugiri not only saw a personal increase in power over the land, but also consolidated power among political elites that became known either officially or informally as Tutsi. Previously, they had mostly been local chieftains who were now finding themselves as part of a complex network that allowed the Mwami to build national cohesion in newly acquired regions. The appointed chieftains were occasionally met with local resistance. For example, in the Northwest region the Balera group challenged the power of the Nduga who had been appointed to the region by the royal court. The contestation was along clan, rather than ethnic, lines, as both groups were considered Tutsi under the then ethnic understanding. During this period, there was an increase in the long-standing traditions of ubuhake and ubureetwa, a practice of vassalage under which labor and resources are exchanged for political favor. Many of the lands that Rwabugiri had annexed, such as Bugoyi, Bwishaza and Kingogo in the east had no previous contact with Tutsi pastoralists and had been entirely inhabited by Hutu. The period following annexation saw a heavy influx of Tutsi into these areas. At first, the relationship between Tutsi and Hutu in these areas were mostly peaceful and commercial.

== German Colonial influence ==
Rwanda was unlike other African states as it was initially not divided among the colonial powers during the Berlin Conference in 1884. Instead, Rwanda was assigned to the German Empire in the later 1890 conference in Brussels. Still, there were no expeditions made until 1894, when the German explorer, Count Gustav Adolf von Götzen led an expedition into Tanzania. Germany had made little effort to establish a colonial administration at the time, as they had limited forces in East Africa, and Rwanda was a densely populated territory with an existing strict administrative network. The death of Kigeli IV, however, and the subsequent coup weakened the state and opened a window for German direct colonization in 1897.

== Last True Rwabugiri ==
After Kigeli IV died, his son Rutalindwa was declared king. The new monarch's queen mother, however, was not his biological mother but was another wife of Kigeli IV; Kanjogera of the Bega clan. Rutalindwa's birth mother was from a politically weak clan, the Abakono. The Nyiginya Clan, to which the old and new mwami belonged, was also weak at this particular time because Kigeli IV had killed chiefs from this lineage of clans who had shown too much independence. As such, the Bega clan was in a unique position after the death of Kigeli IV to change the status quo and assume power. Together with her brother Kabare, chief of the Bega clan, Kanjogera carried out a coup d'état at Rucunshu where Rutalindwa was killed and Kanjogera's own son, Musinga, was named king under the name Yuhi V Musinga. Kanjogera and her brother were effectively in charge at his point, as Musinga was still too young to rule. The two continued to purge the Nyiginya who had survived Kigeli IV's purge, as to avoid the possibility that they would return to power. It was under this conflict that German colonialists began to exercise control over the Mwami by supporting their royal forces.

== Bibliography ==
- Léon Delmas. Généalogie de la Noblesse du Ruanda. Kabgaye.

Regnal titles
Preceded by Mutara II Rwogera	King of Rwanda; 1867–1895	Succeeded by Mibambwe IV Rutarindwa
