= Kanjogera =

Umugabekazi of Rwanda
- Tenure: 1889 – 1931
- Successor: Nyiramavugo III Kankazi
- Coregency: Mibambwe IV Rutarindwa (1889–1896); Yuhi V Musinga (1896–1931)
- Born: c. 1847; Rugaragara, Kingdom of Rwanda
- Died: 2 October 1933 (aged 85–86); Kamembe, Kingdom of Rwanda
- Spouse: Kigeli IV Rwabugiri (m. 1861; died 1895)
- Issue: Prince Munana; King Yuhi V Musinga
Regnal name
- Nyiramibambwe IV (1889–1897); Nyirayuhi V (1897–1931)
- House: Bega
- Father: Rwakagara
- Mother: Nyiramashyongoshyo

Kanjogera (c. 1847–2 October 1933), officially known by her regnal names Nyiramibambwe IV and Nyirayuhi V, was the queen mother (umugabekazi) of the Kingdom of Rwanda from 1889 to 1931, becoming the regent and then co-ruler of the state during the reign of her son Yuhi V Musinga.

A member of the powerful Bega clan, she became the consort of Rwandan King Kigeli IV Rwabugiri in 1861 and rose to his favorite wife, bearing him two sons. When Kigeli IV Rwabugiri appointed his son Mibambwe IV Rutarindwa as co-regent in 1889, Kanjogera was chosen as the new monarch's queen mother despite this being a breach of traditional customs. After Kigeli IV Rwabugiri's death in 1895, Kanjogera led a faction alongside her brother that plotted to overthrow Mibambwe IV Rutarindwa to place her own son on the throne. This conspiracy culminiated in the Rucunshu Coup of 1896, paving the way for Kanjogera to establish a new regime with her underage son as puppet ruler. The Bega-led government faced substantial resistance from various groups over the next years, contributing to Kanjogera and her brothers opting to accept submission to the German Empire to gain allies and stabilize their rule. After also organizing a series of purges, she gradually cemented her reign and continued to hold great power after her son came of age. Her rule saw the gradual colonization of Rwanda, first by the German Empire and then Belgium. In 1931, Kanjogera and her son were deposed by the Belgian administration, spending the rest of their lives in exile.

== Biography ==
=== Early life and marriage to Kigeli IV Rwabugiri ===
Kanjogera was born at Rugaragara in Rwanda around 1847. Her parents were part of the state's nobility, with her father being Chief Rwakagara who was part of the Bega clan and the Bakagara lineage, directly descending from Rwakagara. Her mother Nyiramashyongoshyo was the daughter of Mukotanyi of the Banyiginya clan and the Baka lineage. She grew up with three full siblings, namely her sister Nyamashaza and her brothers Cyigenza and Mbanzabigwi, and 17 half-siblings born to her father's other wives, including Giharamagara (Senyamuhara), Nyamushanja, Ruhinajoro, Ruhinankiko, Kabare, Rwibishenga, Sharibabaza, Ryahama, Rwabigwi, Rwandoha, Segatwa, Rubera, Nsekarubera, Shengenya, Ilibagiza, Nyirandilikiye, and Ikinani. Her wider family was politically very influential and held high-ranking positions, with many male members being chiefs and the women often marrying other powerful nobles or even the kings (mwami) of Rwanda. Women could also rise to the powerful position of Queen Mother (umugabekazi), serving as the co-ruler of the king. The Bega were one of the clans whose members were allowed to become queen mothers. Accordingly, many Bega women had risen to queen mother during Rwandan history, and Bega women had often retained great influence on their royal sons.

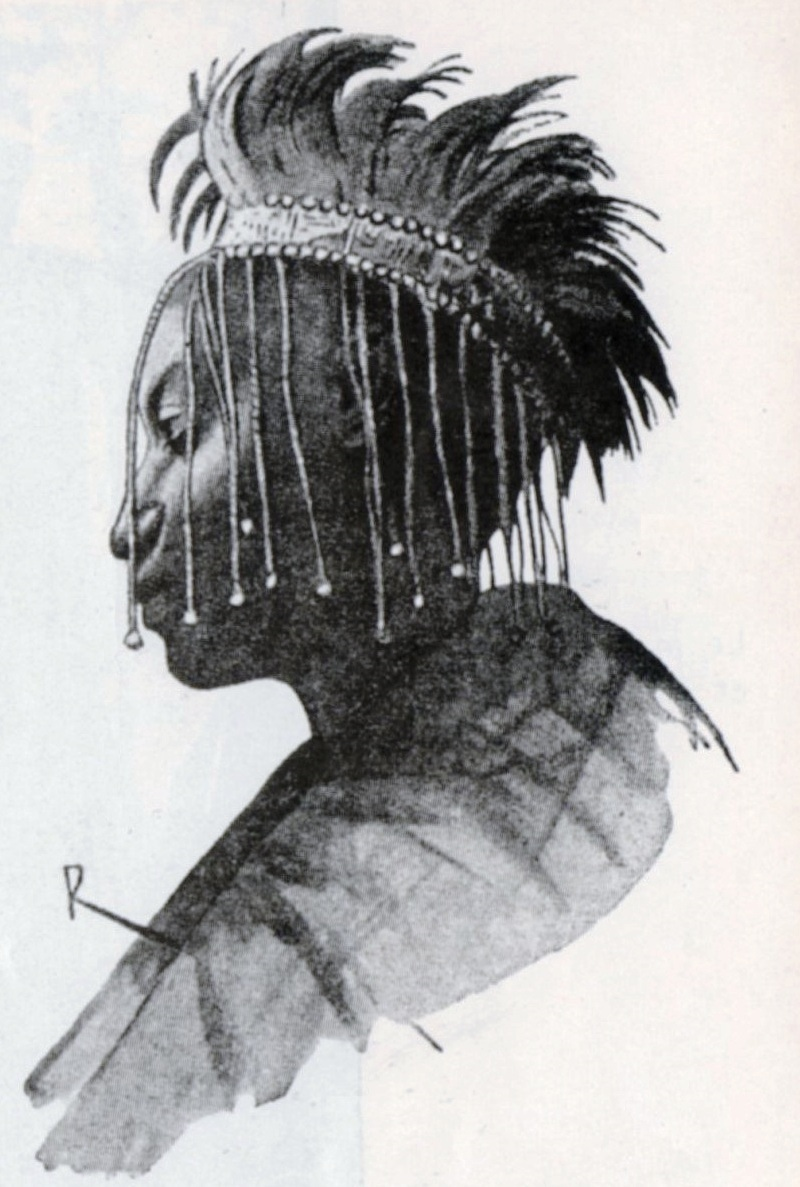
Kanjogera rose to power after marrying Kigeli IV Rwabugiri (pictured).

When Kanjogera was around 14 years old, her marriage with King Kigeli IV Rwabugiri was arranged. Oral traditions claim that the monarch fell deeply in love with the girl during their first meeting, immediately gifting her a large herd of dynastic cows as well as a residence in Kabuye, a location in Jabana. The marriage took place at Ngara in Bumbogo in October 1861. Kanjogera moved to the Kabuye residence in 1862, and was often visited by the monarch; she reportedly showcased great affection and attention during each visit, further increasing Kigeli IV Rwabugiri's love for her. However, she suffered from several miscarriages, but eventually gave birth to two sons, Munana around 1870 and Musinga around 1883. The birth of Munana further increased her standing in Kigeli IV Rwabugiri's eyes, and he gifted her more residences at Giseke, Nyagisenyi, Bweramvura in Kinihira, Gatsibo in Mitoma in Mutara, Bweramvura in Rutongo, Mwima in Nyanza and Sakara in Gisaka. This marked her rise to the king's favorite consort, and she became celebrated by royal court members with laudatory songs such as Ikibasumba ("the one who surpasses the others") and i Mitoma.

Kanjogera's rise in status also benefitted her family. Her brothers Ruhinankiko and Kabare were granted marriage to the monarch's sister and daughter respectively, with Kabare also receiving command of the powerful Abashakamba militia and the Impeta-Umuhozi cattle herd. Other brothers, namely Mbanzabigwi, Giharamagara (Senyamuhara), and Nyamushanja were also granted high officer positions in the royal army and administrative duties. According to traditional narratives, Kanjogera quickly started to stand out due to breaking traditional taboos for Rwandan women. One story related how the queen's brother Giharamagara, by then appointed as royal beer maker, got into a fight with King Kigeli IV Rwabugiri during a military campaign to Butembo. The two were alone aside of Kanjogera in a hut, and the dispute escalated into violence until Giharamagara started to strangle the monarch, whereupon the queen took a sword and killed her own brother to save her husband. This earned her the monarch's lasting gratitude, though led to her being accused of having conspired her brother's death. She subsequently became generally known to wield a sword, something usually forbidden to women in Rwanda; popular stories accused her of having a "penchant for bloodshed".

Kanjogera's eldest son Munana died unexpectedly in 1886. To avoid a succession struggle after his death, Kigeli IV Rwabugiri eventually chose his adopted adult son Rutarindwa as a successor and appointed him co-regent. In accordance to Rwandan customs, a queen mother was traditionally also appointed when a new monarch took power. As Mibambwe IV Rutarindwa's mother was already dead, Kigeli IV Rwabugiri opted to make Kanjogera the "adoptive" queen mother for Mibambwe IV Rutarindwa. This was a controversial choice, and the king's advisors as well as the ritualists unsuccessfully argued against the choice. Traditionally, adoptive queen mothers had to lack sons eligible to rule and belonged to the same lineage as their adoptive son. In contrast, Kanjogera was part of a different clan and had a son, Musinga, who could succeed the throne, both traits which made her a potential opponent of Mibambwe IV Rutarindwa. Furthermore, Kigeli IV Rwabugiri's father Mutara II Rwogera had mandated that no more Bega clan members should become queen mothers. The exact reason for Kanjogera's appointment as queen mother remains unclear; it was popularly attributed to Kigeli IV Rwabugiri's immense love for his favorite wife. Historian Alison Des Forges alternatively suggested a realpolitik reasoning, as the king might have sought to appease the powerful Bega by connecting them with the new monarch without granting them full control. Rutarindwa was enthroned with the name Mibambwe IV in 1889, while Kanjogera took the regnal name Nyiramibambwe IV.

=== Power struggles and coup ===
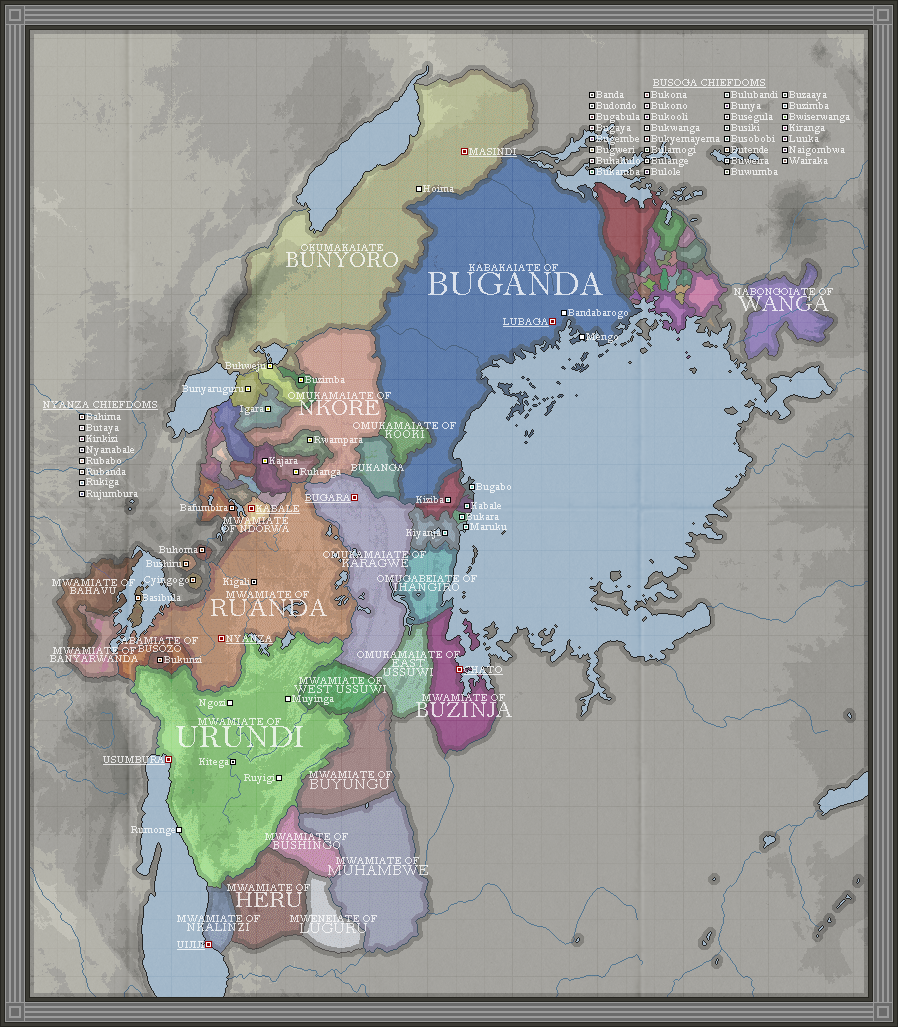
The kingdoms of the African Great Lakes, c. 1880. Rwanda is marked in orange.

In September 1895, Kigeli IV Rwabugiri unexpectedly died from illness in late 1895, either at the start or during a military expedition against the Bushi on the west side of Lake Kivu (modern-day eastern Democratic Republic of the Congo). Mibambwe IV Rutarindwa thus became the sole monarch, and the transfer of power initially appeared smooth. In reality, a Bega-led faction surrounding Queen Mother Kanjogera as well as her influential brothers Kabare and Ruhinankiko were already plotting a political takeover. After completing the burial as well as mourning/purification ceremonies for Kigeli IV Rwabugiri, Kanjogera's clique covertly began to set their plans to place her son Musinga on the throne into motion. The plotters gathered prominent allies in Chief Rutishereka, Prince Baryinyonza, and Rukangirashyamba who was the guardian of the kingdom's esoteric code. Their faction was opposed by a loyalist faction consisting of powerful court officials such as Rutikanga, Kibaba, Chief Bisangwa, Prince Muhigirwa, Chief Mugugu, Prince Karara, and Chief Cyoya. The king's party commanded the most powerful units in the royal army, ensuring that conspirators were initially at a disadvantage. Suspecting the disloyalty of Kanjogera's group, Muhigirwa urged Mibambwe IV Rutarindwa to use his military strength to purge the Bega faction at court, but the king refused.

The first open challenges to Mibambwe IV Rutarindwa's regime did not come from within, however, but from the border regions. The death of Kigeli IV Rwabugiri triggered revolts in various regions, as conquered peoples and vassal rulers used the opportunity to break away from Rwandan control. Furthermore, an armed expedition of the Congo Free State entered southwestern Rwanda and set up camp at Shangi, seeking to annex the region into the private state of Belgian King Leopold II. Disputes erupted at the Rwandan court over the best course of action in response to the Congo Free State's aggression, as the Rwandan leadership knew of the power of the European colonial militaries due to a minor battle during Kigeli IV Rwabugiri's reign. Various officials thus argued for attempts at a peaceful solution, but Kanjogera's brothers Kabare and Rutishereka argued that the Europeans had come as conquerors and could not be tolerated. They convinced Mibambwe IV Rutarindwa to send his best troops under his loyal officers Bisangwa and Muhigirwa to deal with the invasion. Watkins, Jessee, and military researcher Frank Rusagara argued that the dispatch of the elite royalist troops under the king's loyal commanders was likely part of a conspiracy by the Bega faction; by provoking a conflict with the Belgians, the Bega faction ensured the "inevitable defeat" of Mibambwe IV Rutarindwa's best troops as well as his humiliation.

The Battle of Shangi in July 1896 was a political disaster for Mibambwe IV Rutarindwa. The Rwandan royal army suffered a crushing defeat, and Bisangwa was killed in combat. The king's reputation heavily suffered, weakening his position at court. The Bega-led faction under Kanjogera exploited the situation, organizing the killings of several followers of the king, including Mugugu and Bisangwa's brother Sehene. The clique also convinced Prince Muhigirwa to defect to their side. The tensions became increasingly obvious and public, with even common Rwandans starting to move around with their weapons in expectation of violence.

In December 1896, the Bega under Kabare eventually launched the Rucunshu Coup, overthrowing Mibambwe IV Rutarindwa. After his loyal troops were defeated by the coupists, the monarch set fire to his residence and committed suicide alongside his wives and children. In the process, the spiritually important regalia such as the royal drum also burnt and were destroyed, permanently tarnishing the reputation of the following regime. The queen mother expressed concerns over the loss of the items during the coup, but Kabare reportedly responded "We have the mwami, we can make the drum". After her victory, Kanjogera relocated the royal residence from Rucunshu to Rwamiko (Nyamabuye); her son Musinga was declared the new king. The underage boy was enthroned with the name Yuhi V in January 1897, effectively becoming a puppet ruler of Kanjogera's clique. The queen mother also chose a new throne name, namely Nyirayuhi V.

=== Regency and co-rule ===
==== Initial opposition and agreement with Ramsay ====
After capturing state power, Kanjogera displayed a very determined character, and became the regent and later co-ruler of her son. Researcher Dantè Singiza summarized that her word was regarded as law, and no official decisions were made without her consent. At first, she led Rwanda alongside her brothers Kabare and Ruhinankiko. Seeking to consolidate her control, she put her relatives such as her nephews Rwidegembya, Rwubusisi, and Kayondo into important administrative positions and married her nieces Nyirakabuga, Kagisha, Kankazi, and her great-niece Mukaruhinda to her son. Lacking the old regalia and an official appointment, the Bega-led government relied mainly on terror and threats to cement its rule, quickly initiating the killings of actual or suspected critics. Critical ritualists were removed and replaced by individuals loyal to the ruling Bega triumvirate.

The Bega-led regime quickly faced heavy resistance from various groups, and Rwanda fell into a period of infighting and unrest. Nobles, ritualists, and commoners of many regions deemed Kanjogera's faction to be illegitimate usurpers. The new government was popularly dubbed Cyiimyamaboko ("It is force that rules"), and would keep this monicker for more than 15 years despite propaganda efforts by Yuhi V's supporters. Loyalists of Mibambwe IV Rutarindwa organized as rebels and murdered Kanjogera's older sister Nyamashaza at her residence in Buriza, triggering a brutal purge by the queen mother. Revolts broke out in various areas.

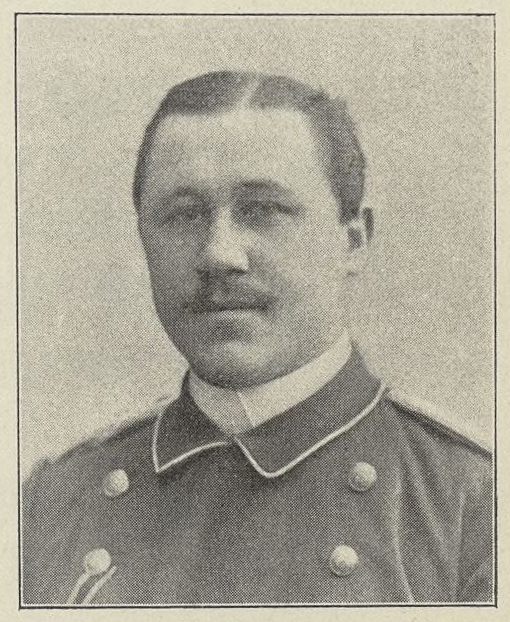
Hans von Ramsay (photo, 1899) negotiated with the Rwandan court soon after Kanjogera's faction had seized power.

Amidst this chaos, an opportunity arose for the new government when Schutztruppe officer Hans von Ramsay, a representative of German East Africa, arrived at the Rwandan royal court in March 1897. German officials claimed Rwanda as part of the German Empire's sphere of influence, and had been alarmed upon hearing of the Congo Free State's intrusion at Shangi. Furthermore, earlier German explorers and visitors had been impressed by the Rwandan monarchy and its seemingly tight grip on power; the Germans thus sought to cooperate with the traditional Rwandan hierarchy to control the region. Suspecting that a boy king like Yuhi V Musinga would not impress Ramsay and be susceptible to potential "mysterious forces the visitor could call into play", the ruling triumvirate selected Mpamarugamba, a court official, to pose as the king during a meeting. In the ensuing negotiations, Mpamarugamba was probably accompanied by Ruhinankiko. Kanjogera likely listened to and influenced the diplomatic talks from behind a screen, though she did not officially meet the German.

Ramsay offered the Rwandan government aid against internal enemies as well as the Congo Free State, demanding a formal submission to Germany in exchange. Viewing Ramsay's offer as a decent deal, Kanjogera's regime agreed, whereupon Ramsay gave a representative of Yuhi V Musinga a Schutzbrief –a diplomatic note of protection– as well as a German flag. This event is generally regarded as the start of the German colonial period in Rwanda. The court's gamble largely succeeded: Kanjogera's regime subsequently managed to cement its power through cooperation with the growing German colonial presence. A system of indirect rule was established, with the very limited German presence effectively controlling Rwanda through its still-autonomous monarchy. This system worked to the benefit of the Germans and the Rwandan monarchy, also protecting the latter from more aggressive colonial influences, but it also marginalized nobles and other groups opposed to Yuhi V Musinga.

One month after Ramsey's visit, a large revolt erupted as Prince Muhigirwa rallied his forces against the new regime in the south, suspecting that his murder was being planned by the triumvirate. He proclaimed his own son as king, but the royal court managed to bribe and intimidate many of his followers into defecting. This allowed the triumvirate's troops to corner and defeat Muhigirwa, resulting in his suicide. Yet this major uprising triggered another large revolt in the northeast, composed of raids by Muhigirwa's loyalists as well as the Ruyaga ("Tempestuous Wind"), a campaign launched by Mutwewingabo and mainly supported by the Bateke, an influential Hutu lineage. The northern rebels largely pledged themselves to another widow of Kigeli IV Rwabugiri, Muserekande, who sought to enthrone her son Biregeya. This revolt quickly gathered pace as various groups saw it as a chance to either break away from Rwandan control or overcome their own marginalization. The insurgency was only defeated by government forces after heavy fighting; Muserekande and Biregeya allegedly killed themselves. Regardless, lingering attacks by rebel remnants continued and various territories stayed outside the court's control.

Overall, the widespread opposition worried the triumvirate, especially Kanjogera, over the spiritual implications of their difficulties. The queen mother feared that the usurpation, loss of the traditional regalia, and the murder of their opponents prevented Yuhi V Musinga from embodying Imana, meaning that her son lacked the "sacred force" traditionally held by the Rwandan kings. This led Kanjogera to repeatedly organize rituals and sacrifices to appease the spirits of her dead opponents during the rest of her reign. The Bega triumvirate also continued attempts to increase support for their puppet king through propaganda with mixed success; legitimists covertly continued to operate at court, and many Rwandans refused to believe that Muserekande and Biregeya had died, staying loyal to their cause.

==== Conflicts within the triumvirate and with the White Fathers ====
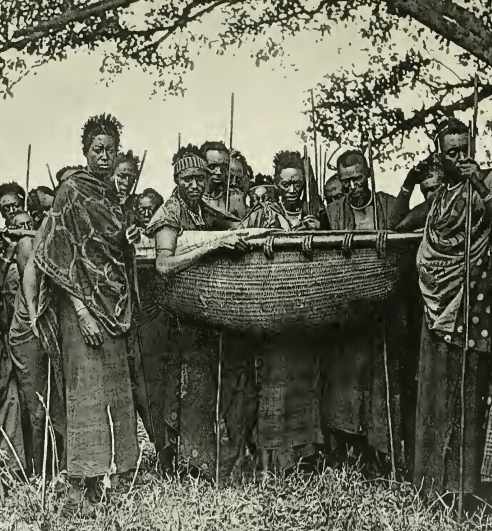
Kanjogera's brother Kabare carried in a litter in 1904. He and Ruhinankiko feuded with each other during much of Kanjogera's early reign.

In addition, Kanjogera's brothers and co-regents Kabare and Ruhinankiko quickly fell out after the coup, with both trying to gain more influence on the queen mother and the puppet king. The initial cause of the division were Princes Baryinyonza and Burabyo, sons of Rwabugiri who were accused of having supported Muhigirwa's rebellion. Ruhinankiko was a friend of Baryinyonza, and thus tried to convince Kanjogera to spare him. She instead sided with Rutishereka –allied with Kabare at the time– who argued that Baryinyonza and Burabyo could potentially try to usurp Yuhi V Musinga in the future, with the queen mother sentencing the two princes to death. Ruhinankiko sought revenge on Rutishereka for this event, but initially refrained from open action due to Rutishereka being under Kabare's protection. Yet Kanjogera gradually came to resent Kabare's power, whereupon Ruhinankiko made his move. In March 1898, he convinced the queen mother that Rutishereka was using sorcery against her to placate Banyiginya's spirit; soon after, Rutishereka was also accused of supporting the pro-Biregeya rebels. In June 1898, the queen mother directly confronted Rutishereka over the accusations, and he tried to earn her mercy by pointing out that he had previously betrayed his own family's leader to support the Bega coup. She reportedly responded "Since you have betrayed such a benefactor, who could trust you now?", and ordered his death. He was executed alongside 15 other members of his lineage. These executions, alongside other purges over the next years, caused various nobles to flee the court for exile. From this point onward, Ruhinankiko held a higher position than Kabare in the triumvirate. However, the infighting between the brothers continued.

In 1899, Kanjogera and Yuhi V Musinga moved to Mwima in Nyanza, the latter becoming the seat of the royal court for the rest of the kingdom's existence. In February 1900, Catholic missionaries of the White Fathers arrived at the Rwandan court. The Bega triumvirate was already informed of the missionaries' activities in bordering regions as well as their potential political power, and they also knew of the missionaries enjoying the protection of the Germans. As a result, the Rwandan court greeted the White Fathers and allowed them to set up a mission state in the kingdom, though Kabare managed to convince the Europeans to put their station far away from the court; Des Forges argued that this might have been an attempt by Kabare to regain favor with Kanjogera.

Within months, triumvirate grew alarmed at the Christian missionaries' success in proselytizing Hutu peasants, viewing this as a potential risk to their own control over the population. In August 1900, the tensions escalated. Njangwe, a native follower of the White Fathers, was allegedly murdered by Kayijuka in Nyanza. When the White Fathers heard rumours of his death, they demanded punishment for the alleged perpetrator. Yet Kanjogera and Ruhinankiko were close to Kayijuka, and declared that there had been no murder, as Njangwe had just gone missing. Yet the court was in a difficult position, as Rwanda was engaged in border raids with the Kingdom of Burundi at the time, with rumours suggesting that the Burundians were acting in support of Biregeya. As a result of the White Fathers' connections with the Germans, the court feared their opposition, especially as "some" even claimed that the missionaries were secretly sheltering Biregeya himself. The court thus requested mediation by Richard Kandt, a German explorer and colonial official who was active in Rwanda. Kandt negotiated for Kayijuka to merely pay a fine, but ten days later Njangwe actually reappeared alive. The affair ultimately embarrassed the missionaries.

Meanwhile, unrest escalated in Gisaka, a region which had been an independent kingdom before being conquered by Rwanda around 1854. Rukura, an alleged descendant of the Gisakan royal family, rallied dissatisfied locals and skillfully enlisted the support of some German officials, Burundian nobles, European traders, and White Fathers. In 1901, the court managed to contain Rukura's movement by deploying the royal army and then convinced the Germans to support the royalist cause in Gisaka, effectively crushing the local opposition. Despite this result, a new political affair ensued when the court arrested Mpumbika, one of Rukura's most important allies, in 1902. Mpumbika had strong ties to the White Fathers, and the missionaries successfully appealed to the local German officials. "Seriously misjudging the extent of German support", the Rwandan government began executing Mpumbika's followers and provoked a firm response of the colonial officials who intervened on the noble's side and humiliated the court by imposing a fine on the king himself for the killings in January 1903. This demonstrated the new power relations in Rwanda, exposing the decline of the royal authority.

Kanjogera blamed Ruhinankiko for mishandling the Mpumbika affair, becoming more critical of his accommodationist stance toward the Germans. Various opponents of Ruhinankiko, including Kabare's supporters, saw this as an opportunity. They accused Ruhinankiko of enriching himself at Rwanda's expense and enstranging the court from the rest of the population. Around February or March 1903, Kanjogera recalled Kabare to the capital from Bugesera. From this point onward, the feud between Ruhinankiko and Kabare became increasingly open and violent. Kanjogera did not fully back either brother, though she seemed to lean toward Kabare; the king instead supported Ruhinankiko, possibly seeing him as a potential ally to wrest government control from his mother. From late 1903 to 1904, supporters of Ruhinankiko and Kabare fought a series of minor battles across the country, while continuing efforts to gather political influences. Kabare eventually triumphed in this contest, with Ruhinankiko being stripped of most of his domains and largely exiled from court in January 1905. According to Des Forges, this development marked the end of the "bloody era that [had begun] with the coup at Rucunshu".

==== Stabilized rule ====
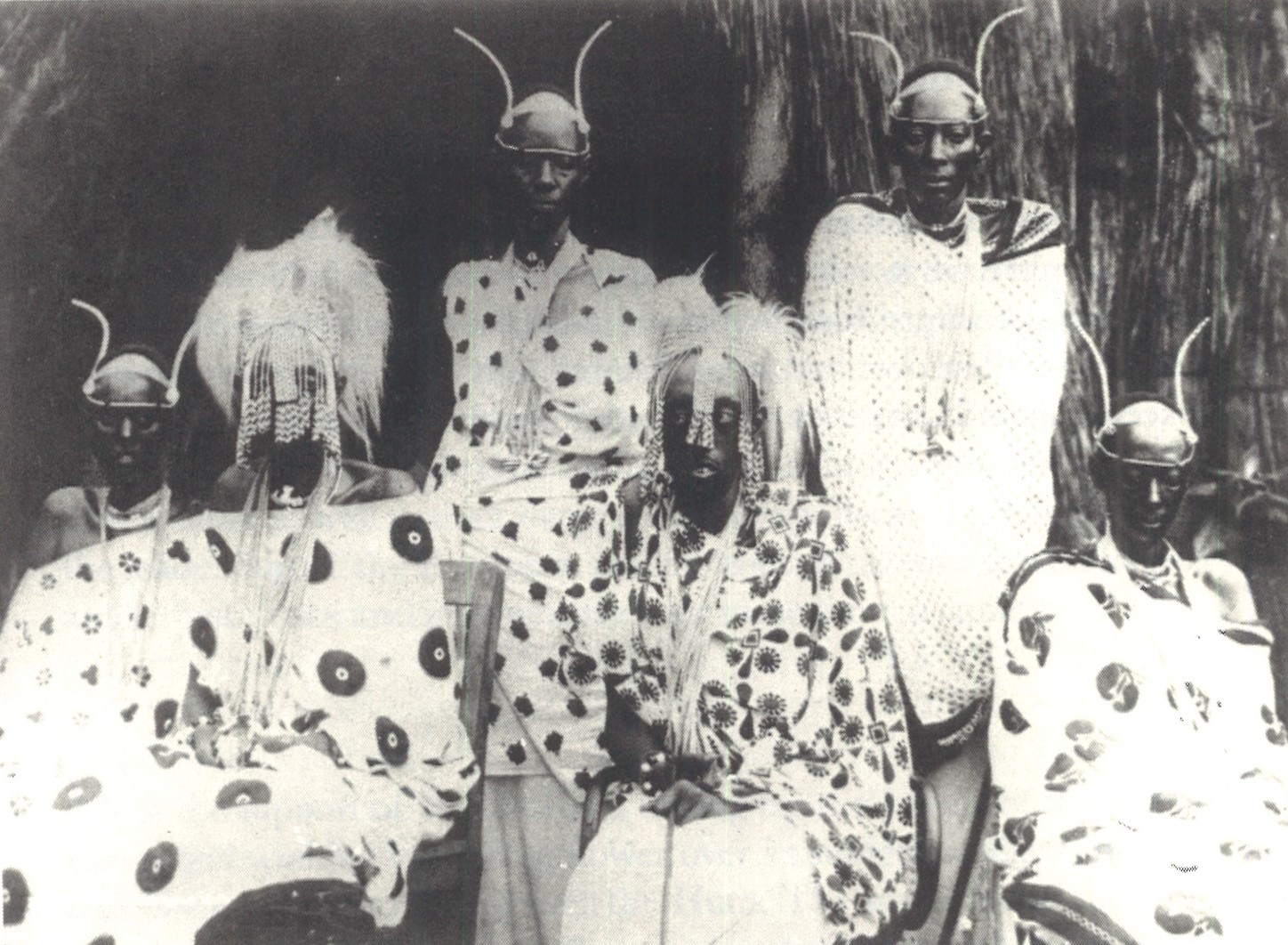
Kanjogera (second from left) with her son Yuhi V Musinga (center) and other family members, c. 1917.

After the main resistance to her son's rule had been defeated, Kanjogera assumed a more traditional role, publicly acting as "a dutiful mother and supporting her son's leadership from behind the scenes". In accordance with her status as queen mother, Kanjogera did not show herself to any European men during the entire German colonial period. However, she once met with Anna Schloiferen, the wife of a German explorer.

In 1912, another major uprising took place in the north, as a certain Ndungutse –claiming to be the rightful heir of the throne– rallied different opposition groups including the forces of Rukara and Basebya to his cause. With the aid of the Germans, the Rwandan government was able to defeat the rebellion.

As Yuhi V Musinga grew older and more self-confident, he became Kanjogera's co-ruler and asserted more control. After World War I, Kanjogera's power diminished, as the new Belgian administration gradually stripped away the rights of the Rwandan monarchy and Yuhi V Musinga became more self-confident. In 1923, he repudiated all his wives related to his mother and married others from other clans. However, he did not move to completely disempower her. In 1928, a group of royal advisors proposed that Kanjogera should commit ritual suicide based on provisions of the esoteric code; Kanjogera rejected the proposal, and Yuhi V Musinga sided with his mother.

=== Deposition and death ===
After repeated disagreements between Yuhi V Musinga and the Belgian administration, Vice-Governor General of Ruanda-Urundi Charles Voisin declared the king and queen mother deposed on 12 November 1931. Kanjogera's grandson Rudahigwa (as "Mutara III") and her niece Kankazi (as "Nyiramavugo III") were enthroned in their place. The former queen mother and her son were then exiled to Kamembe, Shangugu territory in southwestern Rwanda, accompanied by seven of Musinga's wives and their young children and hundreds of followers. The exiles were paid a monthly postal order of 2,000 francs and received the dairy products from a herd of 363 cows. Though officially stripped of her positions, Kanjogera would continue to receive regular visits and gifts from family members and followers of Mutara III Rudahigwa.

She arranged herself with a discreet life and died in Kamembe on 2 October 1933. She received a traditional royal burial at Rutare and was interred next to the grave of her husband Kigeli V Rwabugiri.

=== Legacy ===
In the period after her death, Kanjogera became something of a "national scapegoat" for both Rwandan monarchists and anti-monarchists; the former seeking to shift blame from cooperating with the colonial powers onto her, the latter viewing her as proof of the monarchy's inherent issues. Kanjogera's burial site was destroyed during the Rwandan Revolution in 1962, and replaced by a banana plantation. In 1968, her grave was rediscovered by archaeologist Francis Van Noten of the Royal Museum for Central Africa who exhumed her remains. Today, she rests at the Ethnographic Museum of Rwanda.

In life and after her death, Kanjogera was largely ignored in literature written by male, European colonial authors, "receiv[ing] little credit (or blame) in historical scholarship" for her political actions. Instead, she was mainly remembered through oral history until historians in and outside Rwanda, such as Des Forges and Jan Vansina, gathered new sources and gave her a place in historiography. Independently of scholarly research, she stayed a prominent figure in Rwandan popular culture. She remains a fairly well-known figure in modern Rwanda, with memory of her alternating between reverence for her beauty and seductive power and revulsion over her powerful character and political influence. In the republican period, various influential women were popularly compared to Kanjogera, including Agathe Habyarimana and Jeannette Kagame, often to condemn them as misusing their power and/or for breaking gender norms. Over time, many legends concerning Kanjogera's life emerged. Her family, the Bega clan, remains a powerful force in Rwanda, with Kanjogera's great-grandnephew Paul Kagame serving as current president of Rwanda.

== Assessment ==
Watkins and Jessee conclude that Kanjogera was a skilled and ruthless, at times cruel, politician. In this regard, she did not greatly differ from male Rwandan politicians of her time. Watkins and Jessee describe her as "not unusually violent for a monarch", acting just as an "an elite attempting to stabilize her position as her royal predecessors, both men and women, had done". Her notoriety mainly stemmed from her transgression of gender roles, defying "popular understandings of what a 'good woman' by Rwandan standards should be". Through various actions, Kanjogera intruded into traditionally male domains of the Rwandan society. Even though Rwandan women were usually prohibited from using weapons, she became famous for wielding an "impressive blade" allegedly dubbed ruhuga ("killer"). Alongside her role in the establishment of the colonial system in Rwanda, this contributed to her being particularly villainized during her life and after her death. Popular stories further emphasized her cruelty, cunning, thirst for power, and masculine characteristics, such as by claiming that she allegedly sacrificed babies to ruhuga to slake the weapon's thirst for blood, had blinded court historian Kayijuka for bringing Europeans into her compound while she was bathing, and had often smoked pipes, the latter being a traditional activity only for men and post-menopausal women. Des Forges described the story about Kanjogera "personally cut[ting] down her enemies with a large sword" as a legend stemming from her government's reliance on terror to stay in power.

In regard to her political actions, Watkins and Jessee concluded that Kanjogera's reliance on Europeans, first the Germans and then the Belgians, to support her and her son's governments ultimately undermined the Rwandan monarchy's position and influence. It showcased that the kings could only maintain power thanks to colonial forces. The result of this trend was demonstrated when Kanjogera and Yuhi V Musinga were deposed by the Belgian administration with "minimal resistance from the royal court".
