= List of kings of Rwanda =

Mwami of Rwanda
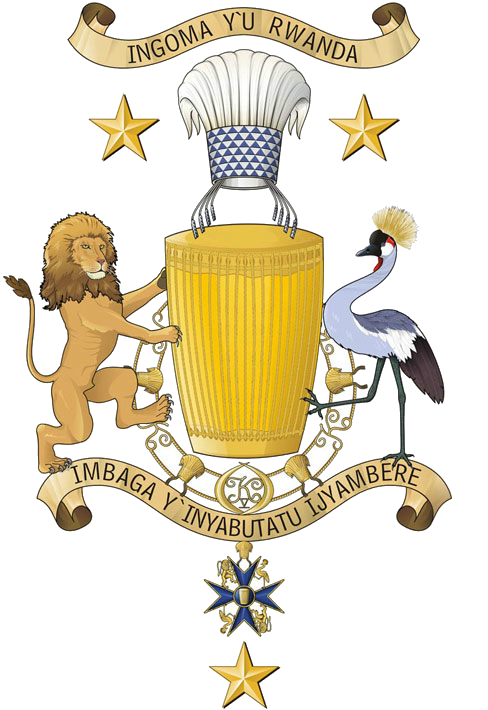
- Coat of arms of the Kingdom of Rwanda

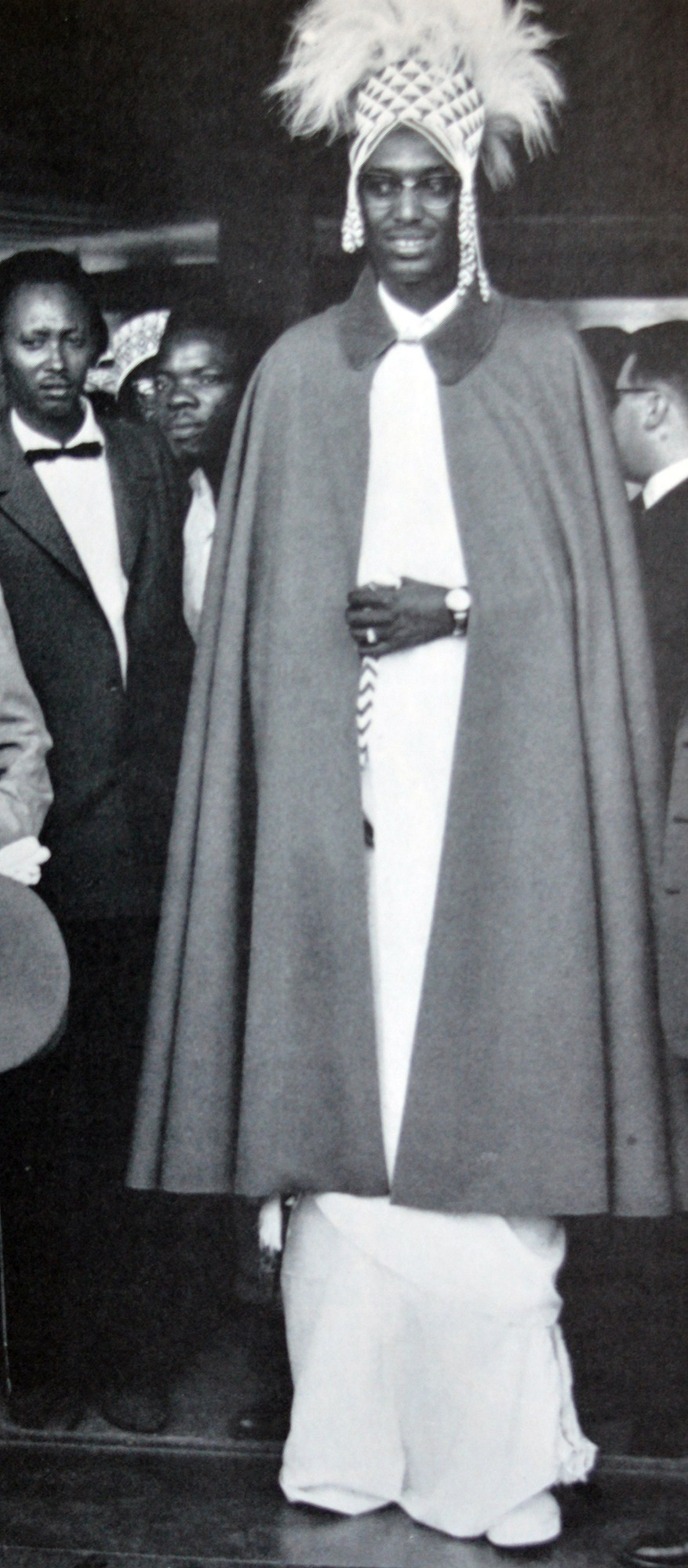
- Last to reign: Kigeli V Ndahindurwa; 28 July 1959 – 28 January 1961

Details
- Style: His Majesty
- First monarch: Gihanga I
- Last monarch: Kigeli V Ndahindurwa
- Formed: Unknown (ancient times)
- Abolished: 28 January 1961
- Residences: Nyanza, Rwanda
- Appointer: Royal Council of Abiru
- Pretender: Prince Emmanuel Bushayija

This article contains a list of kings of Rwanda. The Kingdom of Rwanda was ruled by sovereigns titled mwami (plural abami), and was one of the oldest and the most centralized kingdoms in the history of Central and East Africa.

Its state and affairs before King Gihanga I are largely unconfirmed and highly shrouded in mythical tales.

== Kings of Rwanda ==
=== Before 14th century ===
- Gihanga I
- Kanyarwanda I Gahima I
- Rukuge
- Rumeza I
- Yuhi I Musindi
- Rumeza II
- Nyarume
- Rubanda (Lugalbanda)
- Ndahiro I Bamara (Wamala)

=== 14th–20th centuries ===
14th–19th centuries
Portrait	Name (Lifespan)	Reign		Notes
Portrait	Name (Lifespan)	Vansina (2004)	Stewart (2006)	Notes
	Ndahiro II Ruyange	–	c. 1350–1386	
	Ndahiro III Ndoba	–	c. 1386–1410	
	Ndahiro IV Samembe	–	c. 1410–1434	
	Nsoro I Samukondo	–	Omitted	
	Nsoro II Byinshi	–	c. 1434–1458	
	Ruganzu I Bwimba	–	c. 1458–1482	
	Cyilima I Rugwe	–	c. 1482–1506	
	Kigeli I Mukobanya	–	c. 1506–1528	
	Mibambwe I Sekarongoro I Mutabazi	–	c. 1528–1552	
	Yuhi II Gahima II	–	c. 1552–1576	Enumerated as Yuhi I by Stewart.
	Ndahiro II Cyamatare	–	c. 1576–1600	
	Ruganzu II Ndoli	–	c. 1600–1624	
	Mutara I Nsoro III Semugeshi	–	c. 1624–1648	
	Kigeli II Nyamuheshera	–	c. 1648–1672	
	Mibambwe II Sekarongoro II Gisanura	c. 1700–1735	c. 1672–1696	
	Yuhi III Mazimpaka	1735–1766	c. 1696–1720	Enumerated as Yuhi II by Stewart.
	Kalemera Rwaka Ntagara	1766–1770	c. 1720–1744	
	Cyilima II Rujugira	1770–1786	c. 1744–1768	
	Kigeli III Ndabarasa	1786–1796	c. 1768–1792	
	Mibambwe III Mutabazi II Sentabyo	1796–1801	c. 1792–1797	
	Yuhi IV Gahindiro	1801–1845	c. 1797–1830	Enumerated as Yuhi III by Stewart.
	Mutara II Rwogera (1802–1867)	1845–1867	c. 1830–1853	
	Kigeli IV Rwabugiri (1840?–1895)	1867 – September 1895	c. 1853–1895	
	Mibambwe IV Rutarindwa	September 1895 – December 1896	c. 1895 – November 1896	
20th century
Portrait	Name (Lifespan)	Reign		Notes
	Yuhi V Musinga (1883–1944)	December 1896 – 12 November 1931		
	Mutara III Rudahigwa (1911–1959)	12 November 1931 – 25 July 1959		
	Kigeli V Ndahindurwa (1936–2016)	28 July 1959 – 28 January 1961		

== Pretenders since 1961 ==
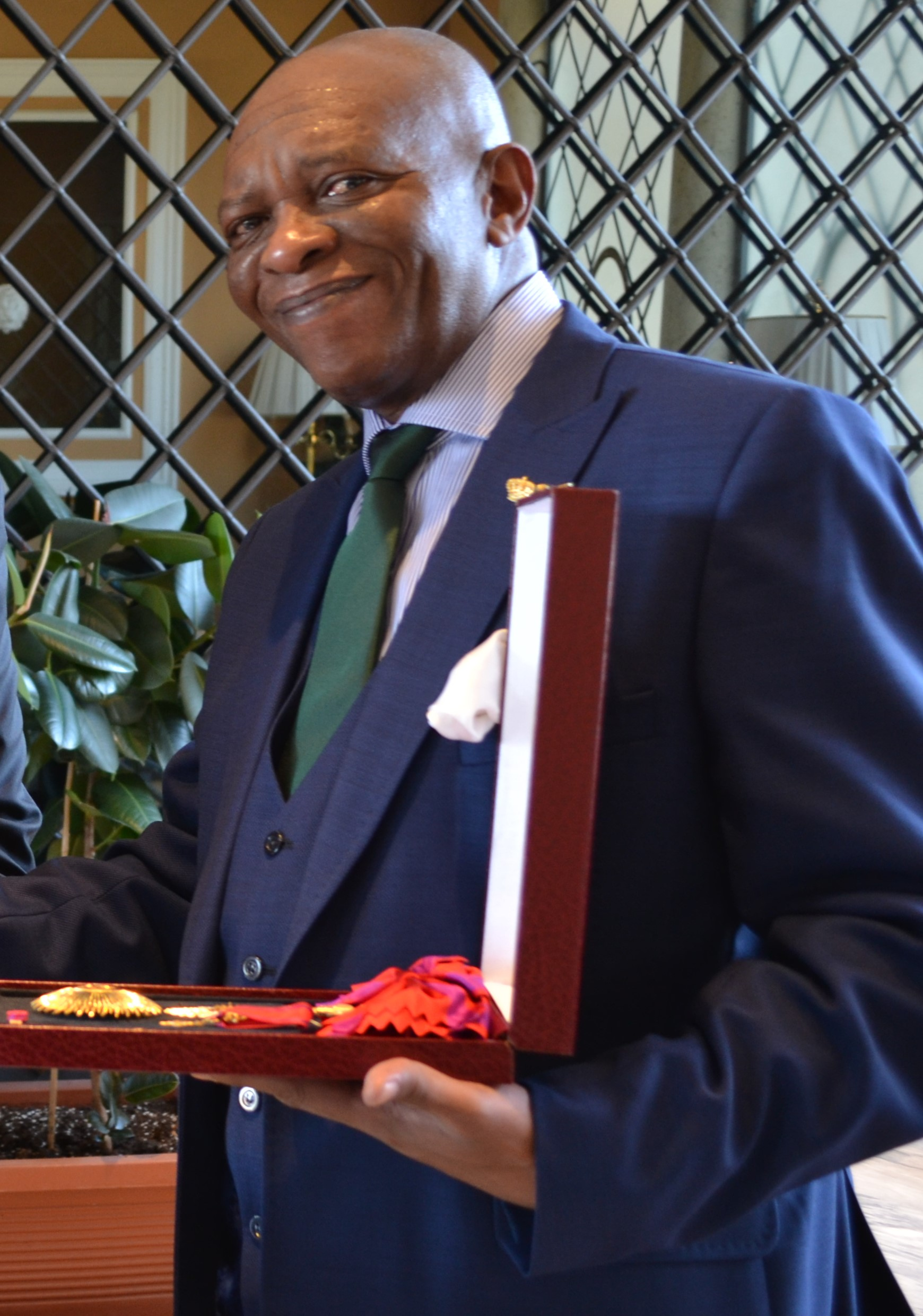
Prince Emmanuel Bushayija (Yuhi VI).

On 28 January 1961, in the coup of Gitarama during what was dubbed the Rwandan Revolution by the Belgian-favored Hutu extremist party Parmehutu, the Belgian colonial overseers abolished the monarchy and Rwanda became a republic (retroactively approved by a Hutu led referendum held on 25 September of the same year). Afterwards, Kigeli V Ndahindurwa continued to maintain his claim to the throne until his death on 16 October 2016 in Washington, D.C. On 9 January 2017, the Royal Council of Abiru announced Prince Emmanuel Bushayija as the new heir to the throne. Prince Emmanuel adopted the regnal name Yuhi VI.

== See also ==
- History of Rwanda
- Kingdom of Rwanda
- Ruanda-Urundi
  - List of colonial residents of Rwanda
- List of presidents of Rwanda
- Vice President of Rwanda
- Prime Minister of Rwanda
