= Kanyarwanda I Gahima I =

Gahima I
- Mwami (King), Progenitor
- Reign: Nakada period.(Ubwami bwumushumi)
- Dynasty: Nyiginya
- Father: Kazigaba
- Mother: Nyirankende Nyiragahima Nyamususa

Gahima I in Rwandan oral tradition is recited by the Abiru (royal historians and priests) as one of the early Mwami (kings) of Rwanda, following the long reign of his father, Kazigaba, in the region around the Nile’s source and adjoining territories. Within these traditions, Gahima I is regarded as a foundational ancestral figure for several African cattle-keeping pastoral communities, including the Tutsi, Bahima, Bahinda, Bahaya, and Banyiginya, as well as related groups further along the Nile corridor. It is not clear whether his reign took place in the location of modern-day Rwanda as variants of his name exist in other parts of East Africa such as Uganda and Tanzania and Egypt as Kayima and Khem where they claim him as their ancient king. He is also believed to be the Biblical Ham. Gahima's maternal grandfather is orally cited in the Rwandan theogony and mythology as Rurenge. Rurenge is regarded as one of the progenitor kings at the Nile’s source, according to Rwandan Ubwiru.

Clarifications on the Name “Gahima”

Gahima I, also known as Gahima Kibamba, was the son of Kazigaba. He is distinct from Gahima II, the son of Gihanga. Gahima II is identified as Kanyarwanda, whereas Gahima Kibamba has, in certain historical reinterpretations, been associated with the Biblical Ham—an attribution arising from interpretive frameworks within the Rwandan ubucurabwenge tradition. Gahima II succeeded King Gihanga in the royal lineage.

== Ancestry ==
Ancestors of Kanyarwanda I Gahima I

3. Gihanga I
2. Gahima I
1. Yuhi I Musindi

Regnal titles
| Preceded by Gihanga | King of Rwanda; Antiquity | Succeeded by Yuhi I Musindi |
