= Gihanga =

Gihanga I
- Mwami (King)
- Reign: Estimated; Summer of 1091 AD.
- Born: Africa
- Died: Kingdom of Rwanda
- Issue: Kanyarwanda I Gahima I
- Dynasty: Banyiginya
- Father: Kazi

Gihanga I ("Creator", "Founder") is a Rwandan cultural hero described in oral histories as an ancient king popularly credited with establishing the ancient Kingdom of Rwanda. Gihanga descended from a line of Nyiginya headed by Kigwa and introduced foundational elements of the African Great Lakes civilization, including fire, cattle, metalworking, hunting, woodworking, and pottery. He was described as possessing talents in leadership, technology, and spirituality. It is said that Gihanga ruled Rwanda from his palace in the forest of Buhanga, an area that retained its forbidden and sacred status through the period of colonialism until the new government of Paul Kagame opened it to the public in 2004. No tangible evidence exists - apart from oral myths - to indicate that Gihanga lived, although many Rwandans believe that he once lived .

Legend tells that Gihanga was the product of the marriage of two lineages. The paternal lineage of his great-great-grandfather came from Kigwa ("Descended from Heavens"), who said to have come down to Rwanda from the heavens to form the royal line, while his mother's side descended from an ancestor named Kabeja. His father, Kazi (a descended god), was a blacksmith from whom Gihanga learned the art. Over the course of his childhood, he is said to have lived in several locations, including the eastern village of Mubari and his maternal uncles' village of Bugoyi in the northwest.

Predominant colonial-influenced oral accounts set the reign of Gihanga and the establishment of the Kingdom of Rwanda in the 11th century but modern researchers and scholars dispute this account as the interpretation of Gihanga's deeds and qualities match characteristics of kings that lived during the bronze age . According to Rwanda's oral history, several smaller clans may have existed during Gihanga's reign, including those of the Singa, Gesera, Zigaba and Rubanda clans. Legend states that Gihanga was succeeded by a descendant named Gahima I , who is said to have unified Gatwa, Gahutu and Gatutsi, the ancestors of the Twa, Hutu and Tutsi castes respectively.

In later periods, a religious practice arose in honor of Gihanga in the northwestern and northern parts of central Rwanda, and was many centuries later re-introduced to the royal court by king Ruganzu Ndori - a remarkable historic king who further strengthened the Nyiginya Kingdom of Rwanda centuries later. Elements of the religion included the fire of Gihanga which was kept continually burning nonstop for centuries at the royal court at a site known as "the place where the cattle are milked", and was said to have been continuously burning since Gihanga's reign millennium back. Gihanga's fire was extinguished at the end of the reign of Yuhi V Musinga in 1932 on the orders of a Belgian governor; The sending of tributes from the royal court to a site at Muganza in Rukoma said to be Gihanga's tomb; and royal court's keeping of a herd of long-horned cattle said to have been descended from Gihanga's own herd. These cattle were managed by the Heka family of the Zigaba clan, who lived near the tomb and provided the royal court with some of its most respected and powerful ritualists. Another family of ritualists - the Tega of the Singa clan, similarly drew their prestige from the fact that one of their ancestors, Nyabutege, had reportedly received the principles of the dynastic drum (Kalinga) from Gihanga.
