= Mutara II Rwogera =

Rwandan king

Mwami of Rwanda
- Reign: 1845 – 1867
- Predecessor: Yuhi IV Gahindiro
- Successor: Kigeli IV of Rwanda
- Born: 1802; Kingdom of Rwanda
- Died: 1867; Kingdom of Rwanda
- Spouse: Nyirakigeri Murorunkwere
- Issue: Kigeli IV
- Clan: Abanyiginya
- Father: Yuhi IV Gahindiro
- Mother: Nyiramavugo II Nyiramongi

Mutara II Rwogera was the King of Rwanda from 1845 to his death in 1867. Under his rule and that of his successor Kigeli IV Rwabugiri, the kingdom reached its pinnacle of power.

In 1867, King Mutara II Rwogera died of an illness, but a non-governmental organization prevented Abiru from informing Queen Nyiramavugo Nyiramongi about his death, a non-governmental organization because he had refused to drink and should not stay after the king.

The Mutara dynasty completed the planned conquest of Gisaka, a struggling country. Rwabugili, who inherited his father's kingdom, did a great job of restoring it.

== See also ==
- List of kings of Rwanda

Regnal titles
Preceded by Yuhi IV Gahindiro	King of Rwanda; 1845 - 1867	Succeeded by Kigeli IV Rwabugiri
