= Ubuhake =

Ubuhake is the name given to the social order in the Tutsi-ruled kingdoms of Rwanda and Burundi from approximately the 15th century to 1958. It has been frequently compared to European feudalism. Based on cattle distribution, it was, however, a much smaller system than the one of uburetwa, which affected a much larger segment of the population and was based on land distribution. The Tutsi monarchy used the land distribution system of uburetwa to centralise control of the lands in most of Rwanda in a system called igikingi. Only the northwest of Rwanda, where Hutu land owners refused to submit, were not part of igikingi.

The two dominant ethnic groups in both Rwanda and Burundi are the Tutsis and Hutus. One of the chief historical distinctions between them was that Tutsis were primarily cattle-raisers while Hutus were farmers.

Initially, the ubuhake contract stipulated that Hutus were entitled to use Tutsis cattle in exchange for service, be it personal or military. Similarly, land that had come under Tutsi control could be used in a similar way in the uburetwa system. It gradually evolved to a class system in which land, cattle, and power were consolidated in the Tutsi group, and Hutus became indentured servants to Tutsi lords, who granted them protection, cattle, and the use of land in exchange for service and farm produce. Intermarriage between Hutu women and Tutsi men was strictly forbidden, although Hutu men often married Tutsi women. At the summit of this feudal pyramid was the mwami, or Tutsi king, who was regarded as being of divine ancestry.

The ubuhake and uburetwa systems were condoned by the European colonialists of Rwanda and Burundi, Germany and later Belgium, who supported the Tutsi aristocracy in order to maintain control. However, the colonialists demanded that the labor also be done for the benefit of the colonial administration, instead of just for the Tutsi aristocracy.

The continued promotion of a single ethnic group became politically difficult for Belgium in the postwar period, however. Many European powers were granting independence to their colonies, and Belgium moved to phase out the ubuhake and uburetwa systems in Rwanda by 1958, having convinced the Mwami to give up the system in 1954. Increasing pressure against the ubuhake and uburetwa systems from Hutu solidarity movements, particularly Grégoire Kayibanda's Parmehutu party in Rwanda, ensured that the system was abolished entirely with the victory of Parmehutu in the 1961 Rwandan parliamentary election.

The ubuhake and uburetwa system, and its exploitation by both Tutsi Mwamis and by European colonial powers, is one source of antagonism between the Hutu and Tutsis. Many of the recent events in both countries can be traced to this historical tension, including the 1994 Rwandan genocide.

== Similarities to Bugandan land distribution systems ==
In Buganda, leaders also exerted control through title to land, rather than lineages. Uganda was also a heavily populated area. A hereditary king (called the kabaka) and a landed nobility provided a structure similar to those in northern Rwanda at the time of the arrival of European explorers.
