= Mibambwe IV Rutarindwa =

Mwami of Rwanda
- Reign: 1895–1896
- Predecessor: Kigeli IV Rwabugiri
- Successor: Yuhi V Musinga
- Born: Rwanda
- Died: December 1896; Marangara Province Nyanza, German East Africa
- Clan: Abanyiginya
- Father: Kigeli IV Rwabugiri
- Mother: Nyiraburunga

Mibambwe IV Rutarindwa (?? – December 1896, Marangara province, Nyanza, German East Africa) was Mwami of Rwanda between September 1895 and December 1896, having been made co-ruler by his father Kigeli IV Rwabugiri in 1889. Rutarindwa is sometimes transcribed Rutalindwa.

Mibambwe and a faction loyal to him were in conflict with his surrogate mother Kanjogera and her own faction, as they wished to depose him and to replace him with the future king Yuhi V Musinga. Following a coup d'état, Mibambwe committed suicide.

== Rule ==
His adopted father, Kigeli IV Rwabugiri, had proclaimed him co-ruler in 1889, effectively designating him his successor. On Rwabugiri's unexpected death in 1895 while on an expedition in modern-day Democratic Republic of the Congo, he was proclaimed king.

Rwandan Queen Mothers were politically powerful. Rutarindwa's mother had died and, consequently, Rwabugiri appointed another of his wives, Kanjogera, as his surrogate mother. With the death of Rwabugiri, she and her brothers Kabare and Ruhinankiko plotted to put her own young son Musinga, the future king Yuhi V Musinga, on the throne. This culminated in late 1896 in a battle between the King's and the Queen Mother's factions called the Rucunshu Coup, named for the hill that Rutarindwa had moved his court to. After the battle, Rutarindwa committed suicide, and the royal drum was destroyed when his house was burnt down.

Preceded by Kigeli IV Rwabugiri	King of Rwanda; 1895-1896	Succeeded by Yuhi V Musinga
Vacant	Co-ruler of Rwanda; 1889-1895	Vacant
