= Hans von Ramsay =

German officer and explorer (1862–1938)

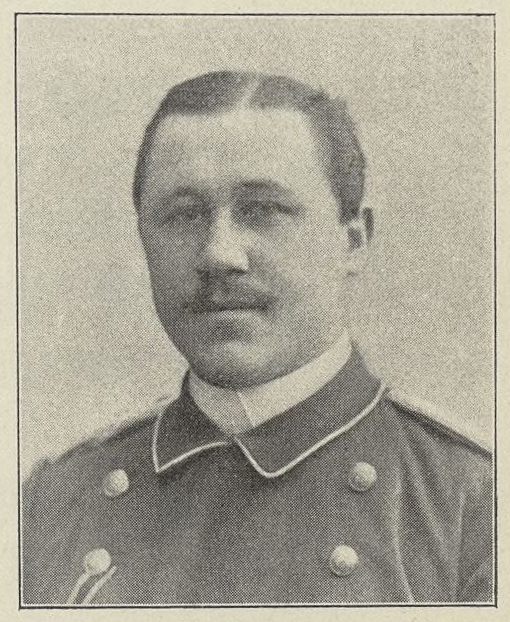
- Hans von Ramsay in 1899
- Born: Hans Gustav Ferdinand Ramsay; May 18, 1862; Tinwalde (West Prussia), Kingdom of Prussia
- Died: January 14, 1938 (aged 75); Tanga, Tanganyika
- Burial place: Tanga; 5°04′27″S 39°05′57″E
- Military career
- Allegiance: German Empire
- Branch: Imperial German Army
- Service years: 1882–1900
- Units: Foot Artillery Regiment No. 11; Schutztruppe for German East Africa
- Commands: Military District of Ujiji
- Awards: Silver Gustav Nachtigal Medal from the Berlin Geographical Society (1898)
- Other work: Exploration of Africa

Signature
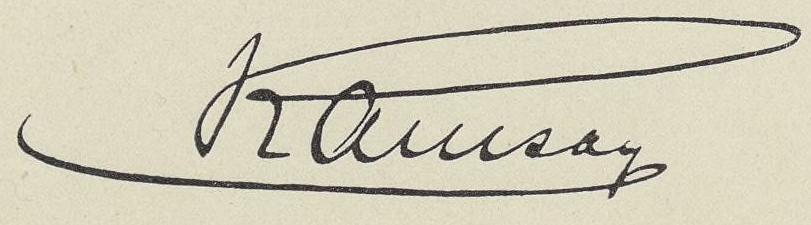

Hans Gustav Ferdinand Ramsay, from 1911 von Ramsay (18 May 1862 – Tanga, 14 January 1938) was an officer in the Imperial German Army and explorer of Africa.

== Early life and education ==
Hans Gustav Ferdinand Ramsay was born in Tinwalde on 18 May 1862.

He graduated from high school in Königsberg.

== Career ==
Ramsay embarked on a military career and in 1882 became a second lieutenant in the Foot Artillery Regiment No. 11 in Thorn. In 1891 he was ordered to serve at the Foreign Office and then assigned to the Schutztruppe for German East Africa. In 1893 he was promoted to first lieutenant and in 1899 he was again assigned to the service at the Foreign Office under the position of the Schutztruppe. In 1900 he was given a statutory pension and permission to wear his previous uniform.

== Activity in the colonies ==
Ramsay gained his first experiences in German East Africa. In 1886, before he was transferred to the local Schutztruppe, he accompanied the Denhardt brothers to Lamu and Wituland. From February 1889 he was an officer in the so-called Wissmanntruppe. In 1890 he was station chief in Bagamoyo, and from April 1891 district magistrate in Lindi. After his transfer to Kamerun, Ramsay succeeded Karl von Gravenreuth as head of the Cameroon Northern Expedition in 1892. For financial reasons, his engagement in Kamerun was not renewed in August 1892. Ramsay therefore moved back to East Africa in 1893 and worked as station chief in Kisaki in 1893, in Iringa and Ulanga in 1894, in Lindi in 1895 and from May 1896 as head of the Ujiji station he founded, the first German base on Lake Tanganyika. Numerous cartographic photographs of the lake area were taken here from 1896 to 1898, and in 1898/99 he was called back to work at the Foreign Office in Berlin.

After leaving active military service in 1900, Ramsay took a position with the Northwest Kamerun Company (GNK), for which he managed business in Kamerun as general representative from 1901 to 1903. To explore and map the concession, he undertook several expeditions through the area between Cross River and Adamawa. Among other things, he is said to have been the first European to visit the Bamum Chiefdom on this occasion in July 1902. In 1906/07 he also made maps of the area of the Southern Kamerun Society (GSK) to determine the boundaries of the concession area.

== Scientific work ==
After returning to Germany again in 1907, Ramsay became a lecturer in regional studies of Kamerun and Togoland at the Seminar for Oriental Languages at the University of Berlin, at the same time began studying law and passed the traineeship exam in 1910. In 1912–1913 he stayed in Kamerun again as head of the border expedition (new eastern border). After World War I, Ramsay was mainly active in journalism and research, including as editor of the Notifications from the German Protected Areas and editor of the German Colonial Newspaper. In addition, from the summer semester of 1925, he again taught as a part-time, unscheduled lecturer at the Seminar for Oriental Languages and was a member of the expert commission of the Ethnological Museum of Berlin. In September 1937 he went on another study trip to East Africa, from which he never returned. He died in Tanga and was buried there.

== Awards ==
Ramsay was a recipient of the silver Gustav Nachtigal Medal from the Berlin Geographical Society (1898). On 24 May 1911 he was raised to the Prussian nobility. In 1927 the Corps Saxonia Göttingen awarded him the Bierzipfel. He had been a member of the Berlin Masonic Lodge Zur Treue since 1922.

== Death and legacy ==
Ramsay died on in Tanga, Tanzania on 14 January 1938.

== Publications ==
- (in German) Bericht des Leiters der Südkamerun-Hinterlandsexpedition H. Ramsay über seine Reise von den Ediäfällen nach dem Dibamba (Lungasi), in: Mitteilungen von Forschungsreisenden und Gelehrten aus den deutschen Schutzgebieten 6 (1893), S. 281–286.
- (in German) Expedition des Generalbevollmächtigten der Gesellschaft Nordwest-Kamerun, in: Deutsches Kolonialblatt 12 (1901), S. 234–238.
- (in German) Hauptmann Ramsay über seine neueste Reise im Gebiet der Nordwestkamerun-Gesellschaft, in: Deutsches Kolonialblatt 13 (1902), S. 607 f.
- (in German) Nssanakang, in: Globus 85 (1904), S. 197–202.
- (in German) Das deutsche Kongo-Ufer an der Ssanga-Mündung, in: Die Grenzgebiete Kameruns im Süden und Osten, Berlin 1914, S. 95–98.
- (in German) Der Ubangi-Zipfel, in: Die Grenzgebiete Kameruns im Süden und Osten, Berlin 1914, S. 110–114.

== See also ==
- List of colonial governors of Ruanda-Urundi

== Bibliography ==
- (in German) Franz Neubert (Hrsg.): Deutsches Zeitgenossenlexikon, Leipzig 1905, Sp. 1144.
- (in German) Florian Hoffmann: Okkupation und Militärverwaltung in Kamerun. Etablierung und Institutionalisierung des kolonialen Gewaltmonopols 1891–1914, Göttingen 2007.
