= Yuhi V Musinga =

King of Rwanda (1896–1931)

Yuhi V of Rwanda
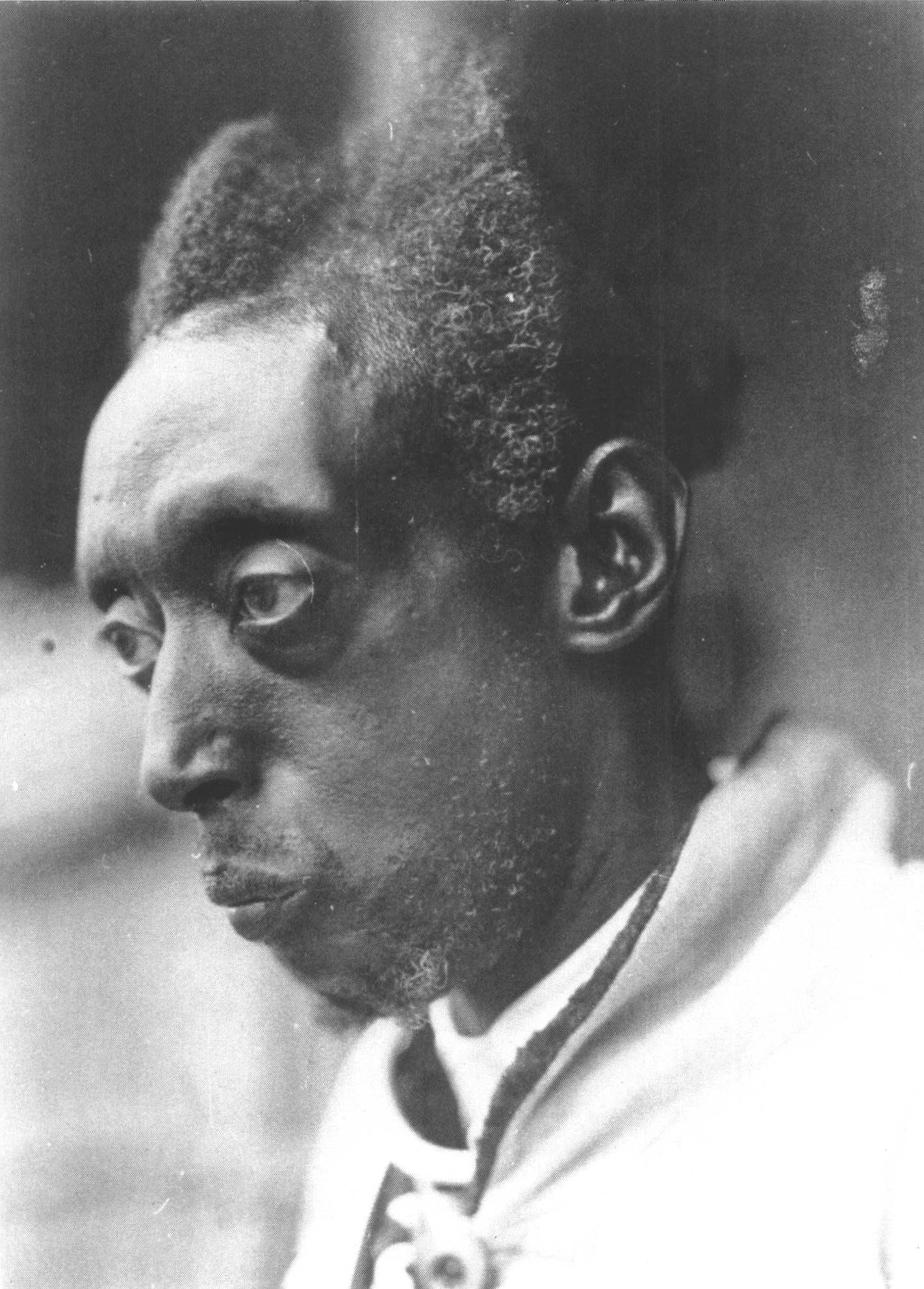
- Musinga (Yuhi) circa 1910

Mwami of Rwanda
- Reign: December 1896 – 12 November 1931
- Predecessor: Mibambwe IV Rutarindwa
- Successor: Mutara III Rudahigwa
- Born: 1883; Kingdom of Rwanda
- Died: 13 January 1944 (aged 60–61); Moba, Belgian Congo
- Spouse: Radegonde Nyiramavugo Kankazi; Mukashema; Nyirakabuga
- Issue: Mutara III Rudahigwa; Kigeli V Ndahindurwa
- Clan: Abanyiginya
- Father: Kigeli IV Rwabugiri
- Mother: Kanjogera

Yuhi Musinga (Yuhi V of Rwanda, 1883 – 13 January 1944) was a king (umwami) of Rwanda who came to power in 1896 and collaborated with the German government to strengthen his own kingship. In 1931 he was deposed by the Belgian administration because of his inability to work with subordinate chiefs and his refusal to be baptized a Roman Catholic. His eldest son, Mutara III Rudahigwa, succeeded him.

== Biography ==
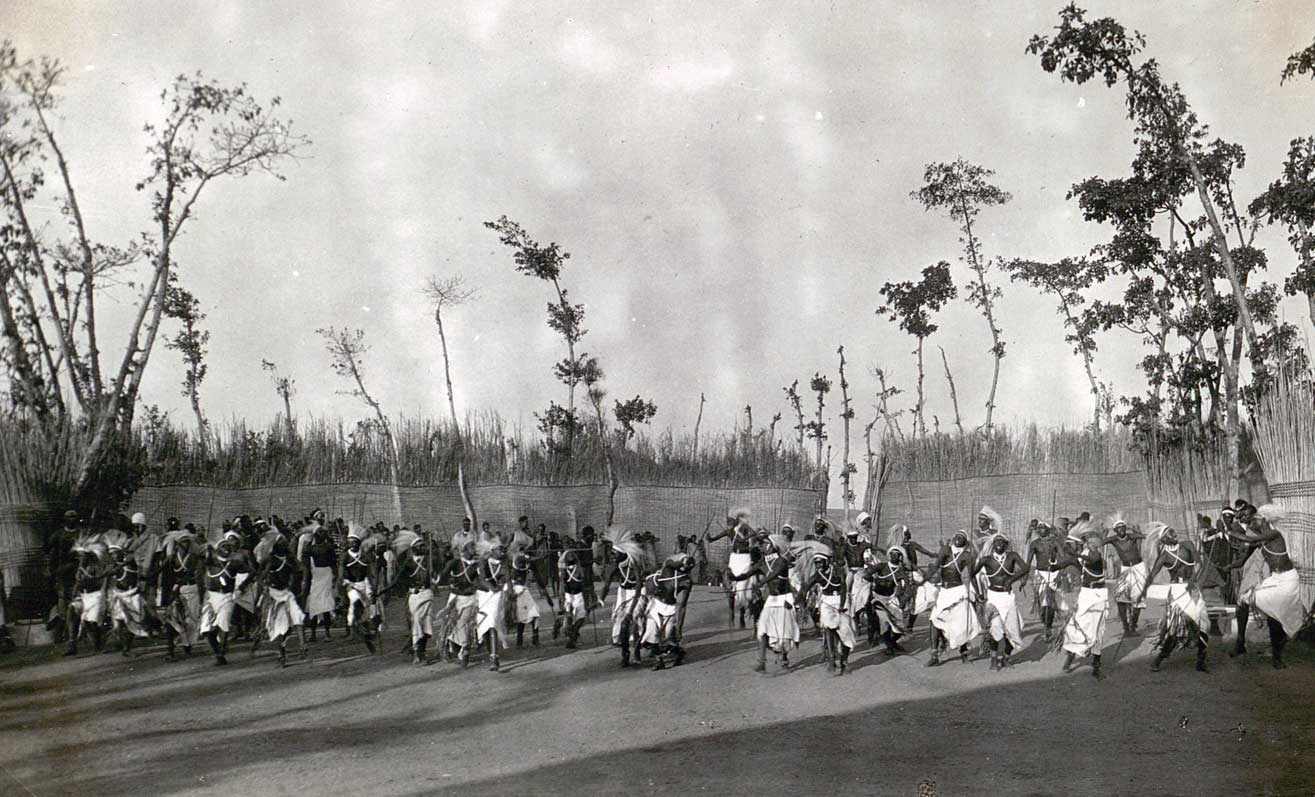
King Musinga’s lion dancers in Nyanza (1928)

Musinga acceded to power as a young teenager, in a palace coup which overturned the short reign of Mibambwe IV Rutarindwa, the original successor to the powerful king Kigeri Rwabugiri (1840–95) of Rwanda. Over his reign Musinga struggled with three major issues. The first was the question of legitimacy. The overthrow of Rutarindwa was organized by members of the Bega clan, including Kanjogera, widow of Rwabugiri and Musinga’s mother. Such an accession to power brought into question the legitimacy of Musinga's claims to kingship, claims normally defined by clear ritual protocol. The second concerned the relation of the royal court to the separate regions of the country, as following Rwabugiri's death many areas occupied by his armies broke away, diminishing the domain of the kingdom. Third, Musinga’s accession was quickly followed by the arrival of German forces in the area, along with a powerful missionary order, the “Missionnaires d'Afrique” (the “White Fathers”), creating a colonial context that marked Musinga’s reign (1896–1931).

Yuhi V's regime was initially quite unpopular and earned the nickname Cyiimyamaboko ("It is force that rules") due to relying on pro-coup forces. The monarch heavily relied on the Began clan of his mother and the Germans to stabilize his reign, but faced many revolts and opposition movements. One of the most serious challenges to his regime was Ndungutse's rebellion in 1912, led by a man who claimed to be the son of Mibambwe IV Rutarindwa and managed to garner widespread support in northern Rwanda. The rebellion was only defeated after a German intervention.

During Musinga’s reign German power was used to reassert royal authority over many autonomous areas, while the court delegates served as colonial administrators, especially under Belgian rule after World War I. The missionaries were also used to try to extend court legitimacy. However, such policies of collaboration with European actors created strong cleavages at the royal court of Musinga, as political factions competed for power and aligned themselves variously with outside actors and local allies. Four factors in particular marked Musinga's reign: World War I, and the replacement of German rule by Belgian rule; the expansion of the royal power to areas autonomous of the court; the presence of many powerful competing factions at the court; and a major famine in 1928–29.

In November 1931, Musinga was deposed by the Belgian administration and replaced by his son Mutara Rudahigwa (r. 1931–59). Exiled first to Kamembe, in southwest Rwanda, and then to Kilembwe, in southeastern Congo, Musinga died on 13 January 1944 by natural causes.

Regnal titles
Preceded by Mibambwe IV Rutarindwa	King of Rwanda; 1896–1931	Succeeded by Mutara III Rudahigwa

== Bibliography ==
- Des Forges, Alison (1986). "'The drum is greater than the shout': the 1912 rebellion in northern Rwanda". In Crummey, Donald (ed.). Banditry, Rebellion and Social Protest in Africa. James Currey. pp. 311–332. ISBN 978-0852550052.
- Des Forges, Alison (2011). Defeat Is the Only Bad News: Rwanda under Musinga, 1896–1931. Madison, Wisconsin: University of Wisconsin Press. ISBN 978-0299281441.
- Strizek, Helmut (2006). Geschenkte Kolonien: Ruanda und Burundi unter deutscher Herrschaft; mit einem Essay über die Entwicklung bis zur Gegenwart [Gifted colonies: Rwanda and Burundi under German rule; with an essay on the development up to the present] (in German). Berlin: Ch. Links. ISBN 978-3-86153-390-0.
- Kagame, Alexis. Un abrégé de l’histoire du Rwanda de 1853 à 1972, II, 129-82. (Butare: Editions Universitaires du Rwanda, 1975), 129-82.
- Rumiya, Jean. Le Rwanda sous mandat belge (1916-1931). (Paris: L’Harmattan 1992).
- Archive Yuhi V Musinga, Royal Museum for Central Africa

Regnal titles
Preceded by Mibambwe IV Rutarindwa	King of Rwanda; 1896–1931	Succeeded by Mutara III Rudahigwa
