= Nyiginya =

Royal dynasty of the Kingdom of Rwanda

The Nyiginya or Banyiginya were a royal Tutsi clan in pre-colonial Rwanda. They ruled the Kingdom of Rwanda until 28 January 1961, when Kigeli V Ndahindurwa was deposed as part of the Coup of Gitarama.
