= Kingdom of Rwanda =

Bantu kingdom in southeast Africa (15th century to 1961)

Kingdom of Rwanda Ubwami bw'u Rwanda (Kinyarwanda) Koninkrijk Roeanda (Dutch) Royaume du Rwanda (French) Königreich Ruanda (German)
- c. 1650–1961
- Coat of arms

- Status: Independent state (15th century–1897); A protectorate under the German East Africa (1897–1916); Part of the Ruanda-Urundi (1922–1961)
- Capital: Nyanza
- Common languages: Kinyarwanda; French; German (official from 1897–1916); Dutch (official from 1922–1961)
- Government: Absolute monarchy (until 1959); Constitutional monarchy under a Hutu-dominated government (1959–1962)
- Mwami
  - 17th century: Ruganzu I Bwimba
  - 1959–1961: Kigeli V (3rd Dynasty) (last king)
- Prime Minister
  - 1959–1962: Grégoire Kayibanda
- History
  - Established: c. 1650
  - Republic declared: 28 January 1961
Succeeded by
First Rwandese Republic
- Today part of: Rwanda

The Kingdom of Rwanda (also known as the Nyiginya Kingdom or Nyginya Dynasty) was a Bantu kingdom in modern-day Rwanda which grew to be ruled by a Tutsi monarchy. It was one of the most centralized kingdoms in Central and East Africa. It was later annexed under German and Belgian colonial rule while retaining some of its autonomy. The Tutsi monarchy was abolished in 1961 after ethnic violence erupted between the Hutu and the Tutsi during the Rwandan Revolution, which started in 1959. After a 1961 referendum, Rwanda became a Hutu-dominated republic and received its independence from Belgium in 1962.

After the revolution and abolition of the monarchy, the deposed Kigeli V eventually settled in the United States, and since then monarchists have maintained a court-in-exile outside of Rwanda. The current pretender to the Rwandan throne is Yuhi VI.

== History ==
=== Origins ===
The later lands of Rwanda were originally inhabited by the Twa, who largely lived as hunters, gatherers, and potters. Hutu people migrated to the area around 1000 and engaged in farming. They also developed a political system based upon highly centralized governance and created a number of principalities. Waves of cattle-raising Tutsi moved south into the region from the fifteenth to sixteenth centuries. A series of villages in the northeastern part of the country came to be governed by Tutsi chiefs whose warriors and attendants competed for lands. In general, the different Hutu and Tutsi groups which cleared forested areas in Rwanda subsequently claimed a heritable ownership of this land, resulting in the development of lineage claims to certain territories (dubbed ubukonde). Lineage members traditionally maintained autonomy in their respective territories, limiting the early power of the developing statelets inside Rwanda.

The true start date of the Kingdom of Rwanda is unknown, as its history was traditionally passed down in oral stories of uncertain reliability. Traditionally, the foundation of Rwanda was attributed to the legendary hero Gihanga who was also credited with the invention of fire and the creation of the cow. Though Gihanga is considered to be a historical figure by many Rwandans, historians have deemed him to be a mythic figure. Either way, the historic origins of the eventual kingdom of Rwanda seem to date to a period from the 14th to the 16th centuries, when a small chiefdom centered on the hill of Gasabo emerged. This early realm, described as "Rwanda of Gasabo" by historians, gradually expanded and united other chiefdoms into a larger, centralized state around Lake Muhazi, near Kigali. Researchers differ when identifying the earliest "king" of Rwanda; historians Rutayisire Byanafashe and Paul Rutayisire attribute this role to Ruganzu Bwimba, whereas historian Jan Vansina regarded Ruganzu II Ndoli as the true founder of the kingdom. Either way, what is now central Rwanda was absorbed by the expanding realm in the 16th century, and outlying Hutu communities were subdued by Ruganzu II Ndoli in the 17th century.

=== Expansion ===
As the kings centralized their power and authority, they distributed land among individuals rather than allowing it to be passed down through lineage groups, of which many hereditary chiefs had been Hutu. Most of the chiefs appointed by the Mwamis were Tutsi. The redistribution of land, enacted between 1860 and 1895 by Kigeli IV Rwabugiri, resulted in an imposed patronage system, under which appointed Tutsi chiefs demanded manual labor in return for the right of Hutus to occupy their land. This system left Hutus in a serf-like status with Tutsi chiefs as their feudal masters. Kigeli IV Rwabugiri also strengthened and reformed the royal army by introducing a conscription system and new, permanent military units. Under Mwami Kigeli IV Rwabugiri, Rwanda became a truly expansionist state. The kingdom significantly grew in territory, conquering a series of smaller kingdoms and principalities. Rwabugiri did not bother to assess the ethnic identities of conquered peoples and simply labeled all of them "Hutu". The title "Hutu", therefore, came to be a trans-ethnic identity associated with subjugation. While further disenfranchising Hutus socially and politically, this helped to solidify the idea that "Hutu" and "Tutsi" were socioeconomic, not ethnic, distinctions. In fact, one could kwihutura, or "shed Hutuness", by accumulating wealth and rising through the social hierarchy. The borders of the kingdom were rounded out in the late 19th century by Mwami Rwabugiri, who is regarded as Rwanda's greatest king. By the end of his reign, Rwanda was a unified state with a centralized military structure.

=== Decline and colonisation ===
Owing to its isolation, Rwanda's engagement with the Indian Ocean slave trade was extremely limited until the end of the 19th century. The first Europeans did not arrive in Rwanda until 1894, making Rwanda one of the last regions of Africa to have been explored by Europeans. When Kigeli IV Rwabugiri unexpectedly died from illness in late 1895, his state began to enter a phase of crisis. His successor, Mibambwe IV Rutarindwa, was challenged by a clique headed by the powerful Bega clan under Queen Mother Kanjogera. The conflicts at court escalated in 1896, when an armed Congo Free State expedition attempted to annex southwestern Rwanda. Mibambwe IV Rutarindwa sent the best and most loyal units of the royal army against the invaders, but the Rwandans were heavily defeated in the Battle of Shangi. Though the Free State still retreated due to internal problems, the defeat greatly damaged Mibambwe IV Rutarindwa's political position, and weakened the Rwandan royal army. The Bega faction exploited this by launching the Rucunshu Coup, overthrowing Mibambwe IV Rutarindwa and driving him to suicide. In his place, Kanjogera's underage son Yuhi V Musinga as installed as a puppet ruler. Rwanda subsequently fell into a period of infighting and unrest.

In 1897, Germany established a presence in Rwanda with the formation of an alliance with the king, beginning the colonial era.

== Government ==
Under the king, society was organized in a feudal system in which the king had ultimate authority and his subjects were those who lived in his territory. Feudal allegiance bound subjects to the ruler by a scheme of protection and service tied to property. The system was called ubuhake, a concept of mutual relationships, in which a patron provided cattle or land and security in return for a peasant's loyalty and uburetwa, work and services due to the patron. The peasant did not own the cattle or land, but instead was entitled to the milk and calves or the use of the pastures, similar to a tenancy.

The position of Queen Mother was an important one, managing the royal household and being heavily involved in court politics. When their sons ascended to the throne, mothers would take a new name. This would be composed of nyira-, meaning "mother of", followed by, usually, the regal name of the new king; only kings named Mutara do not follow this convention, their mothers taking the name Nyiramavugo (mother of good counsel).

== Military ==
Not all warriors in the Rwandan military were Tutsis, as every adult male was part of a fighting regiment (called intore) (the Twa pygmies were greatly appreciated as warriors for example). Each regiment had a name, which was usually a form of self-praise such as abashakamba (the tough ones), imbanzamihigo (the ones who are praised first), or inzirabwoba (the fearless ones). War acted as a kind of "social coagulant" where Tutsi, Hutu and Twa were first and foremost Banyarwanda facing a common enemy.

Historian Louis de Lacger describes the Rwandan army as having "quixotic tendencies." A significant amount of the fighting (especially against rival kingdoms with similar cultures and outlook) was ritual warfare. Champions from both sides engaged each other in single combat. De Lacger also notes that King Kigeli IV Rwabugiri (1853–95) "who meant business when he went into battle", preferred to recruit mainly Hutu armies as they were "less elegant but more efficient."

Jean-Marie Kagabo describes the command system of the Rwandan military:

The king would choose either a Tutsi or a Hutu; his duties lay in the military domain, given that each Rwandan male necessarily belonged to an army unit (militia). Rwandan historian Alexis Kagame (1972) cites the example of two famous army chiefs of Hutu origin. The first was Bikotwa, the son of Rubashamuheto, whom King Kigeli IV Rwabugiri appointed to head two army divisions: Inzirabwoba and Indirira. The second was Nkiramacumu, who succeeded the Tutsi Chief Nkundukozera as head of the same Inzirabwoba a few years later.

In the late 19th century, King Kigeli IV Rwabugiri invaded the neighboring Kingdom of Nkore, bringing with him as many warriors "as the cloud of midges", along with many women and cattle, intending to permanently occupy Nkore. Kigeri's troops rapidly overran Nkore and chased then-king Ntare V all the way to the northeast near Nkore's border with Buganda. King Kigeri IV Rwabugiri brought his own cattle and women from Rwanda because he considered the cattle of Nkore too ugly to supply him with milk, and Nkore women too ugly to sleep with.

== See also ==
- History of Rwanda
- List of kings of Rwanda
