= First Rwandese Republic =

Rwandan government (1961-1973)

Rwandese Republic République Rwandaise (French)
- 1961–1973
- Flag Coat of arms
- Motto: Liberté, Coopération, Progrès (Liberty, Cooperation, Progress)
- Anthem: "Rwanda Rwacu" (English: "Our Rwanda")
- Status: Republic under Belgian colonial authority (1961); Independent republic (1962-1973)
- Capital: Kigali
- Common languages: Kinyarwanda • French
- Demonym: Rwandan
- Government: One-party presidential republic
- President
  - 1961: Dominique Mbonyumutwa
  - 1962–1973: Grégoire Kayibanda
- Prime Minister
  - 1961-1962: Grégoire Kayibanda
- Legislature: National Assembly
- History
  - Coup of Gitarama: 28 January 1961
  - Deposition of King Kigeli V: 1961
  - 1973 Rwandan coup d'état: 1973

Area
  - Total: 26,338 km^{2} (10,169 sq mi)
- Currency: Rwandan franc
- ISO 3166 code: RW
Preceded by	Succeeded by
Kingdom of Rwanda	Second Rwandese Republic
- Today part of: Rwanda

The first Rwandese Republic was proclaimed in 1961 after a 1961 referendum abolished the Kingdom of Rwanda.

== Establishment ==
On 25 September 1961, a referendum was held to establish whether Rwanda should become a republic or remain a kingdom. Citizens voted overwhelmingly for a republic. After parliamentary elections held on the same day, the first Rwandese republic was declared, with Kayibanda as prime minister. Dominique Mbonyumutwa was named the first president of the transitional government.

== Presidency of Dominique Mbonyumutwa ==
Dominique Mbonyumutwa rose to prominence in the late 1950s, during a period of instability in Rwanda. At the time, Rwanda was part of the Belgian-administered United Nations trust territories of Ruanda-Urundi. Ethnic divisions between the Tutsi, who held the majority of the political power, and Hutu, who had the majority of the population, began to dominate Rwandan life. Mbonyumutwa was one of the few Hutu subchiefs in Rwanda, and a leader in the Hutu Emancipation Movement Party (Parmehutu) under Grégoire Kayibanda. He had a functioning relationship with the Rwandan King, Mutara III Rudahigwa, but after the King died in July 1959, Mbonyumutwa was in a less stable position.

On 1 November 1959, Mbonyumutwa was assaulted by a group of Tutsi political activists in Byimana in Southern Province. Rumors spread that Mbonyumutwa had died in the attack. This incident triggered the "social revolution" of November 1959. Prior to this, there had never been any systematic political violence between Hutus and Tutsis, but Hutus reacted to the attack with a wave of reprisals against Tutsis. Within a week, self-organized groups of Hutus were committing arson and even murder against their Tutsi neighbors.

On 28 January 1961, during a people's congress which abolished the Rwandan monarchy and proclaimed that Rwanda became a social republic, Mbonyumutwa was chosen as its first president. He traveled around the country for weeks to establish himself as the King's replacement and to shore up support for the new government. The United Nations condemned the new government as "one racist dictatorship [replacing] another" (with Hutus now holding power over the Tutsis), but agreed to oversee a referendum to approve the new government in September. The referendum abolished the monarchy with 80% of the vote, and a simultaneous parliamentary election led to a National Assembly dominated by Parmehutu members. Mbonyumutwa stepped down as interim president, and Grégoire Kayibanda was chosen by the assemblymembers to succeed him.

After stepping down as president, Mbonyumutwa exercised the functions of Magistrate first, then Member of Parliament before holding an honorary position as Chancellor of National Orders in the service of the subsequent president Juvénal Habyarimana until his death on 26 July 1986.

== Presidency of Kayibanda ==
Between 1961 and 1962, Tutsi guerrilla groups staged attacks into Rwanda from neighboring countries. Rwandan Hutu-based troops responded, and thousands more were killed in the clashes. On 1 July 1962, Belgium, with UN oversight, granted full independence to the two countries. Rwanda was created as a republic governed by the majority MDR-Parmehutu, which had gained full control of national politics. In 1963, a Tutsi guerrilla invasion into Rwanda from Burundi unleashed another anti-Tutsi backlash by the Hutu government; their forces killed an estimated 14,000 people. The economic union between Rwanda and Burundi was dissolved and tensions between the two countries worsened. Rwanda became a Hutu-dominated one-party state. In excess of 70,000 people had been killed.

Kayibanda was elected president on 26 October. He led a government chosen from the membership of the directly elected unicameral National Assembly of Rwanda. Peaceful negotiation of international problems, social and economic elevation of the masses, and integrated development of Rwanda were the ideals of the Kayibanda regime. He established formal relations with 43 countries, including the United States, in the first ten years. Despite the progress made, inefficiency and corruption developed in government ministries in the mid-1960s.

The Kayibanda administration established quotas to try to increase the number of Hutu in schools and the civil service. This effort ended up penalizing the Tutsi. They were allowed only nine percent of secondary school and university seats, which was their proportion of the population. The quotas also extended to the civil service. With unemployment high, competition for such opportunities increased ethnic tensions. The Kayibanda government also continued the Belgian colonial government's policy of requiring ethnic identity cards, and it discouraged "mixed" marriages.

Kayibanda increased his power step by step in his first three years in office. Following more violence in 1964, the government suppressed political opposition. It banned the political parties UNAR and RADER and executed Tutsi members. Hutu militants used the term inyenzi (cockroaches) as a pejorative to describe Tutsi rebels for what was perceived as infiltrating the country. Hundreds of thousands of refugees moved to neighbouring countries. By 1965, Parmehutu was the only legal party in the country. At elections held that year, Kayibanda appeared alone on the ballot for president. He was reelected in 1969, again as the only candidate. In both elections, a single list of Parmehutu candidates was returned to the legislature. The 1962 constitution of Rwanda, enacted by Kayibanda's regime, proscribed communist activities and propaganda as Belgian settlers conditioned the gain of independence to the rejection of Communism, in the era of the iron curtain. The UNAR party threatened to turn their back on the Belgians and adhere to communism.

Kayibanda pursued a pro-Western, anticommunist foreign policy. Rwanda enjoyed cordial relations with the Republic of China, while strongly criticizing the People's Republic of China's policies in Africa. Kayibanda's government adopted a generally neutral stance on the Arab–Israeli conflict and the Vietnam War. The Catholic Church was closely involved with Parmehutu, and they shared local resources and networks. Through the church, the government maintained links with supporters in Belgium and Germany. The country's two newspapers supported the government and were Catholic publications.

In the presidential elections of 1973 a project promulgated on 18 May was presented, the duration of the presidential term of Kabiyanda was extended from 4 to 5 years, and the age limit of 60 years was eliminated. With North-South regionalist rivalries, President Kayibanda's regime was accused of having progressively dismissed the political leaders of the north and of concentrating power in the hands of the nationals of his native prefecture, Gitarama.

== See also ==
- History of Africa
- History of Burundi
- List of kings of Rwanda
- List of rulers of Rwanda
- List of presidents of Rwanda
- Politics of Rwanda
- Prime Minister of Rwanda
- Ruanda-Urundi
- Rwanda
- Kigali history and timeline
