= 1957 in Ruanda-Urundi =

- Decades: 1930s; 1940s; 1950s; 1960s
- See also: Other events of 1957

The following lists events that happened during 1957 in Ruanda-Urundi.

== Events ==
=== March ===
- March 24 — The Bahutu Manifesto is created by 9 Hutu intellectuals which demanded Hutu emancipation and democratization.

=== June ===
- PARMEHUTU is formed.

=== Uncertain date ===
- The 1957 Rwandan parliamentary elections are held.

== Births ==
- Paul Kagame — President of Rwanda since 2000
- Fred Rwigyema — Major general (d. 1990)
