= Coup of Gitarama =

1961 abolition of the monarchy in Rwanda

In the coup of Gitarama (28 January 1961) during the Rwandan Revolution, the monarchy in Rwanda, then a part of the Belgian mandate of Ruanda-Urundi, was abolished and replaced with a republican political system. The traditional monarchy was led by a Mwami (king), who ruled through an administration of chiefs and subchiefs in the context of a feudal system of patron-client relations based on tribute. The Mwami and most of his chiefs were members of the Tutsi ethnic minority, a group which wielded considerable social, political economic power. Of subordinate status to the Tutsis was the Hutu ethnic majority. As part of their rule, the Belgians institutionalised a racial hierarchy which favoured the Tutsis at the expense of the Hutus.

A small Hutu counter-elite began to form after World War II, and its members began to promote an ideology known as Hutu Power, which challenged Tutsi-minority domination of Ruanda as an exploitation of the majority by foreigners. One of the new leaders was Grégoire Kayibanda, who in 1959 founded the Parti du Mouvement de l'Emancipation Hutu (PARMEHUTU), a political party which called for the end of Tutsi domination of social life and rejected anti-European hostility and supported gradual democratisation. At around the same time, conservative Tutsi created the Union Nationale Rwandaise (UNAR), a party which demanded immediate independence under the Tutsi monarchy. The Belgians began to show favour towards the staunchly Catholic and anticommunist Hutu elite, as the Tutsi elite and UNAR became more aligned with anticolonialism and socialism. Political tensions rose dramatically after the creation of the political parties, and Colonel Guy Logiest was brought in by the colonial administration to maintain order.

In 1960 the colonial administration hosted municipal elections which were won by PARMEHUTU, and set up a provisional national government in accordance with the results while barring Mwami Kigeli V Ndahindurwa from the country. The United Nations protested the situation, and demanded that Kigeli be allowed to return and a political amnesty be declared before national legislative elections were held. In early 1961 the Belgian metropolitan government reversed course, stating that it would abide by the recommendations of the UN, whereby elections would be delayed, separate referendums would be held on the existence of the monarchy and the issue of independence, and a more broad-based provisional government would be installed. Hutu politicians were infuriated by this decision, and Kayibanda met with Logiest to ask for his support in organising a coup to secure the Hutus' position.

On 28 January 1961 Hutu politicians met in the town of Gitarama and declared the dissolution of the monarchy and the creation of the "Republic of Rwanda". They then created a new government with Dominique Mbonyumutwa as president and Kayibanda as prime minister. The new regime indicated its willingness to remain under Belgian supervision and expressed its desire to meet with Belgian and UN officials. In turn, the Belgian colonial administration announced that it would work with the new Rwandan government. A new government in Belgium was formed in April and it adopted a policy of closer cooperation with the UN to improve its image and attempted to more closely supervise the colonial administration. While the question of the monarchy had yet to be decided via the referendum, Rwanda operated as a de facto republic. In the lead up to Rwanda's legislative elections, political violence killed hundreds of people and led thousands to flee their homes. The elections and the referendum on the monarchy were held on 25 September. PARMEHUTU won nearly 80 percent of the vote, and the population also voted overwhelmingly in favor of abolishing the monarchy. Rwanda became an independent state with Kayibanda as president on 1 July 1962.

== Background ==
=== Social situation in Ruanda ===
Following the end of World War I in 1918, the victorious states partitioned the colonies of the defeated German Empire. Belgium was awarded the mandate of Ruanda-Urundi—two conjoined territories in East Africa—under the auspices of the League of Nations. Within Ruanda there existed a traditional monarchy led by a Mwami (king). The Mwami ruled through an administration of chiefs and subchiefs in the context of a feudal system of patron-client relations based on tribute. The Mwami and most of his chiefs were members of the Tutsi ethnic minority, a group which wielded considerable social, political economic power based on ownership of cattle. Of subordinate status to the Tutsis was the Hutu ethnic majority, a group of people largely associated with farming.

While the Germans had tended to favor a system of indirect rule that strengthened the Mwami's position, the Belgian colonial administration undermined the monarchy, promoted Christianity, and centralised governance under their direct rule. Administratively, Ruanda was largely managed from the city of Usumbura in Urundi, where the Governor of Ruanda-Urundi resided. As part of their rule, the Belgians institutionalised a racial hierarchy which favoured the Tutsis at the expense of the Hutus. The Belgians supported racial theories which held the Tutsis to be of superior, non-African origin and entrusted them with privileged access to education and administrative positions, while most Hutus were relegated to economic subservience to help Belgian businesses. Following World War II, the Ruanda-Urundi mandate became a trust territory subject to the oversight of the United Nations Trusteeship Council. Belgium remained responsible for administering the territory but under these new arrangements was officially obligated to provide for the "political advancement" of its people.

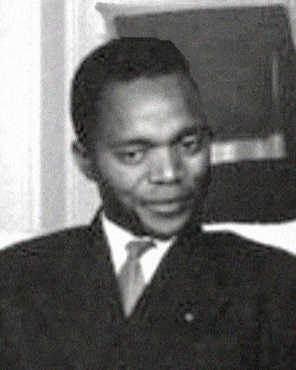
Grégoire Kayibanda, leader of Parmehutu, in 1962

A small Hutu counter-elite began to form in the post-war era, consisting of persons who had been granted access to education and publications through the Catholic Church. The new elites began to promote an ideology known as Hutu Power, which challenged Tutsi-minority domination of Ruanda as an exploitation of the majority by foreigners. One of the new leaders was Grégoire Kayibanda, a former seminarian. In October 1959 Kayibanda founded the Parti du Mouvement de l'Emancipation Hutu (PARMEHUTU, Party of the Hutu Emancipation Movement), a political party which called for the end of Tutsi domination of social life and rejected anti-European hostility and supported gradual democratisation. At around the same time, conservative Tutsi created the Union Nationale Rwandaise (UNAR, Rwandese National Union), a party which demanded immediate independence under the Tutsi monarchy. Other parties such as the Rassemblement Démocratique du Rwanda (RADER, Democratic Rally of Rwanda), a moderate grouping, were created but failed to gain popular traction. Joseph Gitera's Association pour la promotion sociale de la masse (APROSOMA, Association for Social Promotion of the Masses) initially campaigned for the interests of all impoverished people regardless of ethnicity but in response to UNAR's declarations it increasingly pushed for "Hutu liberation". The Belgians began to show favour towards the staunchly Catholic and anticommunist Hutu elite, as the Tutsi elite and UNAR became more aligned with anticolonialism and socialism.

=== November 1959 disorders ===
Political tensions rose dramatically after the creation of the political parties, leading Governor of Ruanda-Urundi Jean-Paul Harroy to ban further political meetings and order the reassignment of three chiefs who were UNAR leaders. The chiefs refused to leave their jurisdictions and rallied crowds to their cause to protest. Mwami Kigeli V Ndahindurwa, a young monarch who had only inherited the throne in July, sided with the chiefs, troubling relations between UNAR and the administration. On 1 November nine members of UNAR's youth wing assaulted Dominique Mbonyumutwa, a Hutu subchief who had refused to sign a letter protesting the transfer of the three chiefs. Mbonyumutwa fought off the youths and returned home, but rumours of his death spread and in the subsequent days a Hutu mob drove out the incumbent Tutsi chief of Ndiza District and elevated Mbonyumutwa to the post. Hutu mobs then engaged in violence across the country, burning and pillaging Tutsis’ homes. The Belgian administration struggled at first to contain the disorder, prompting Mwami Kigeli to request permission to raise a militia to put down the brigandage. Harroy and the Resident of Ruanda, André Preud'homme, denied the request. On 7 November Kigeli and other Tutsi chiefs went ahead with a campaign of repression, leading to the assassination of 20 PARMEHUTU and APROSOMA leaders—including Gitera's brother, the arrest of hundreds of Hutus, and creation of a militia. A UNAR militia attempted to attack Gitera's home near Astrida before being dispersed by the colonial gendarmerie. The Belgian administration flew in reinforcements from the Belgian Congo and initiated a full intervention. Led by Colonel Guy Logiest, the Belgian forces put down most of the violence by 14 November.

As a result of the violence, 21 Tutsi chiefs and 332 subchiefs were forced out of office and over the following months more than 300 Hutus were appointed to replace them. At the same time, Hutu leaders began to reconsider their previous positions of calling for intensive reform in favor of abolition of the monarchy and republicanism. In early December Harroy removed Preud'homme and appointed Logiest in his place. Later that month the Belgian metropolitan government decreed that Logiest and Harroy could veto any of the Mwami's decisions or depose him if deemed necessary. The elections scheduled for January were also delayed until June, giving PARMEHUTU more time to organise. In January 1960 Logiest declared "[W]e must undertake an action in favour of the Hutu, who live in a state of ignorance and under oppressive influences. By virtue of the situation were are obliged to take sides. We cannot stay neutral and sit."

=== Municipal elections and provisional government ===
In March 1960, a UN delegation visited Ruanda to assess the country's progress towards independence. The major political parties encouraged street demonstrations, which deteriorated into fresh outbreaks of violence, during the UN visit. Tutsi homes were burnt in view of the delegation, leading them to declare in April that Belgian plans for June elections were unworkable. Belgium disregarded this advisement and proceeded with the contests.

The municipal elections involved the election of a burgomaster and a council to oversee each of Ruanda's communes, administrative units that would supersede sub-chiefdoms. From these, an indirectly elected Legislative Council would be formed, which would exercise joint legislative authority with the Mwami, though the colonial administration would retain a de facto veto over their decisions. The elections were overwhelmingly won by PARMEHUTU which secured 2,390 local offices. APROSOMA, a political ally, came second with 233 seats while UNAR won only 56 contests. PARMEHUTU's victory was partially overstated by UNAR boycotts at the polls and by the regional divisions which existed in the party. Having superseded the outmoded chiefdoms and initially having unclear limits placed on their power, the new burgomasters enjoyed considerable authority. The Belgian attitude towards UNAR hardened further with the independence of the Congo, as its members forged links with the left-leading Mouvement National Congolais. Kigeli went to Léopoldville, the capital of the Congo, in July and was denied permission to return to Ruanda by the Belgian administration.

On 26 October 1960 the Belgian administration established a provisional government in Ruanda on the basis of the results of the summer contests. Kayibanda was appointed head of the government. The Legislative Council was organised and Gitera was elected its president. It was also announced that formal elections for a Legislative Assembly would be held in January 1961. Faced with diminishing domestic prospects of success, UNAR petitioned the UN to intervene, requesting that it ensure the repatriation of the Mwami and refugees of the 1959 violence and oversee new elections. In response, the UN General Assembly issued a resolution on 20 December, calling for the return of Kigeli and the refugees, the institution of a political amnesty, and the postponement of the legislative elections until Ruanda had experienced a process of national reconciliation. In 1961 the Belgian administration officially renamed Ruanda-Urundi as Rwanda-Burundi.

== Prelude ==
In early January 1961 delegates of political parties from Rwanda and Burundi met in Ostend, Belgium. No decision was reached on whether the two lands should remain unified, but legislative elections for Rwanda were scheduled for 23 January. On 21 January Belgium reversed course. It stated it would abide by the recommendations of the UN General Assembly, whereby elections would be delayed until June, separate referendums would be held on the existence of the monarchy and the issue of independence, and a more broad-based provisional government would be installed. With the possibility of a coalition government including UNAR now likely, Kigeli made plans to return to the country. Hutu politicians and the colonial administration were infuriated by this decision, which was made by the metropolitan government. On 25 January Harroy declared that he was ceding internal autonomy to the provisional government, maintaining that this was necessary to prevent unrest by tempering Hutu disappointment with the postponement of the elections.

In his 1988 memoirs, Logiest wrote that on 25 January Kayibanda met with him. According to this account, Kayibanda stated that Hutu leaders were worried about the UN resolutions—which favored the Tutsi leadership—and thus they wanted "to organize a big coup which will convince Usumbura and Brussels that the games are done and for that we need your help." Logiest wrote, "I could not possibly support him in the rebellious act, but I could not refuse to support him, either […] I promised to help him in organising the meeting to protect the public's welfare, host the delegates, to prepare for the place where it would be held and providing the speakers."

== Coup ==
The coup resulted in the adoption of a national flag.

Minister of Interior Jean-Baptiste Rwasibo called for a national meeting of local elected officials, ostensibly to discuss the maintenance of order in the upcoming elections before independence. Early in the morning on 28 January 1961, trucks began bringing communal councilors and burgomasters to the town of Gitarama. A total of 3,126 local officials were ultimately assembled. The group met in the town market to hear a series of speakers. About 25,000 people gathered nearby to watch. The first to speak was Rwasibo. He delivered a long speech critical of the monarchy, and finished by asking, "What will be the solution given to the problem of the monarchy? When shall we abandon the realm of the 'provisional'? It is incumbent upon you, burgomasters and councilors, representatives of the Rwandese people, to answer these questions." Gitera followed, speaking in Kinyarwanda. He declared the abolition of the monarchy and its regalia—including the royal drum—and proclaimed the establishment of the "democratic and sovereign Republic of Rwanda". The crowd responded with applause and several cheers of "Vive la République!" Kayibanda then addressed the crowd in French. He repeated Gitera's proclamation, initiating more applause. A new national flag of red, yellow, and green was also introduced.

The local officials then proceed to act as a constituent assembly, electing a President of the Republic. After the vote split along regional lines for Kayibanda, Gitera, and Balthazar Bicamumpaka, the body selected Mbonyumutwa as a consensus candidate. It also elected a new 44-member Legislative Assembly, with 40 persons being from PARMEHUTU and four from APROSOMA. The crowd then asked Kayibanda to form a new government. By 7:00 p.m. a 10-member cabinet was agreed upon with Kayibanda as Prime Minister. A supreme court was also formulated and an 80-article republican constitution, inspired by the Constitution of France and those of French colonies, was promulgated. The declaration of the republic sparked mass demonstrations of support across the country, particularly in PARMEHUTU bastions. The new regime indicated its willingness to remain a trust territory under Belgian supervision and expressed its desire to meet with Belgian and UN officials.

== Aftermath ==
There is academic consensus that the coup was achieved with complicity of Belgian officials. Political scientist René Lemarchand wrote in 1970, "Although the evidence is admittedly lacking, there seems little question that the metropolitan government did co-operate on a fairly close basis with the Residency in planning the coup […] if nothing else, the Special Resident must have received unofficial assurance from the Ministry of African Affairs that Brussels would not interfere with the course of action upon which the Hutu leaders were about to embark, no matter how serious the legal implications." In contrast, international studies scholar Aya Tsuruta wrote in 2017, "A careful reading of the NARA documents reveals that it is not entirely correct to say that Belgium unanimously supported the coup, as some Belgian ministers were seemingly unaware of the possibility of a coup, or, at least, they had disagreements with the local administration." A telegram from the United States Embassy in Belgium reported "it is apparent [that the] Belgian administration [in] Ruanda (specifically Harroy) undoubtedly connived at January 28 'coup d'état' without consulting Brussels." According to the report, Belgian Foreign Office officials maintained that Harroy seemed responsible for the coup and that he hardly reported on the affair to the metropolitan government. The telegram also stated that the Belgian government was considering recalling Harroy because of his actions, but this never occurred. Belgium officially denied any involvement in the coup, but the UN was nevertheless angered by the events which had transpired.

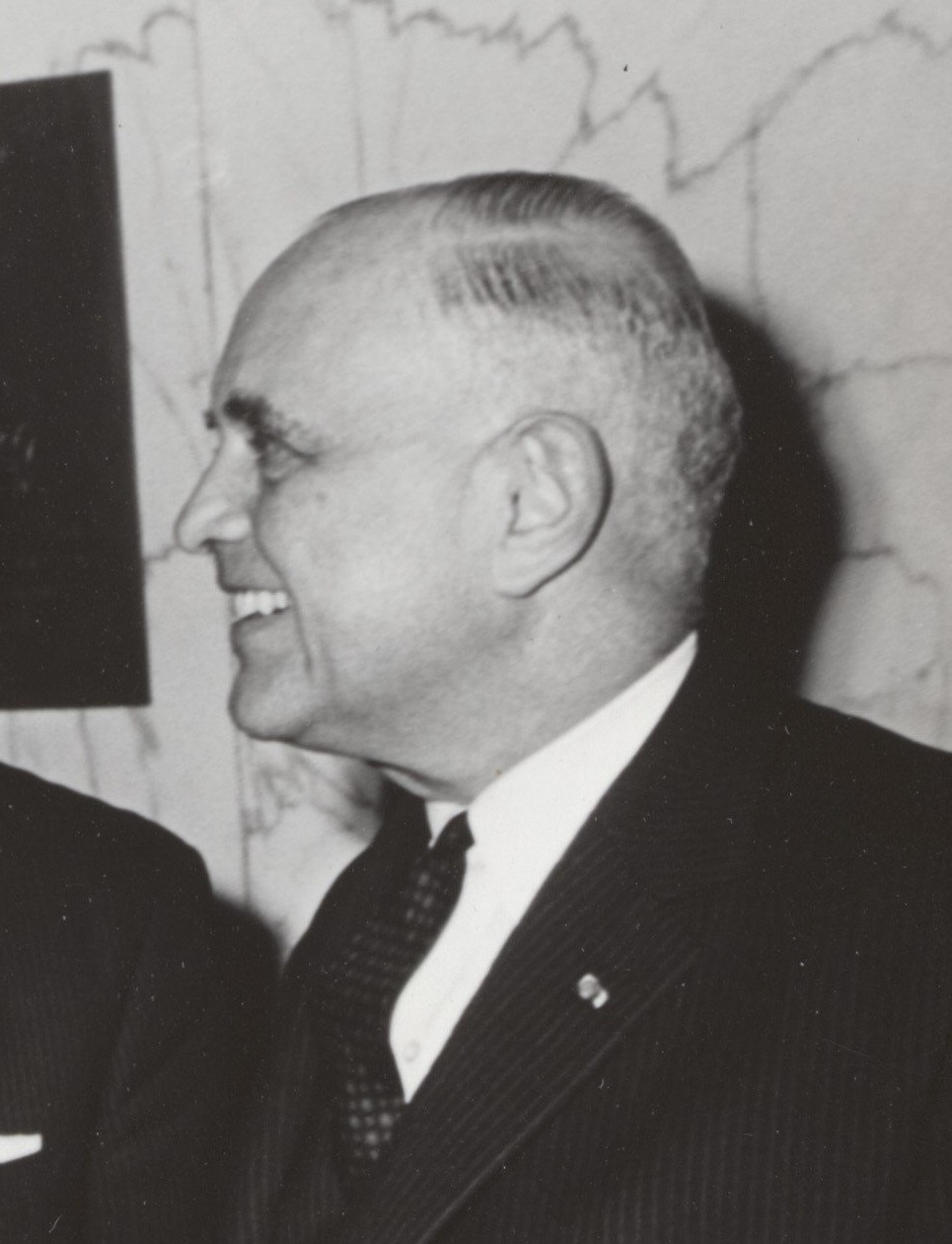
According to an American diplomatic telegram, officials in Belgium thought that Governor Jean-Paul Harroy was responsible for the coup.

On 1 February the Belgian colonial administration announced that, in the interest of avoiding civil disorder, it would give de facto recognition to the new regime. One colonial official stated, "If Kayibanda had not done this, there would have been a lot of trouble, and the United Nations would have had an even bigger mess to answer for." The Belgian metropolitan government also expressed its willingness to meet with leaders of the new regime. PARMEHUTU leaders exerted control over the government, while Belgian administrators continued to work and advised the ministers of the new regime. Despite this, the Belgian government never recognised the Gitarama constitution and indicated that it had no binding force. For their part, the Rwandan leaders never widely published the constitution and continued to accept and implement the colonial administration's legislative decisions.

Following the coup, Mbonyumutwa embarked upon a three-week-long goodwill tour of the country to demonstrate that he had taken the symbolic place of the Mwami. UNAR was left marginalised by the events and ultimately split into a domestic wing determined to participate in the elections and an exile wing that rejected the legitimacy of Rwanda's new political order. A new government in Belgium was formed in April, and Paul-Henri Spaak, a former secretary-general of the North Atlantic Treaty Organization, became the Minister of Foreign Affairs and assumed the portfolio for African Affairs. The new government adopted a policy of closer cooperation with the UN to improve its image and attempted to more closely supervise the colonial administration. While the question of the monarchy had yet to be decided via the referendum, Rwanda operated as a de facto republic. Republican ideals also gained limited traction among some Hutu politicians in Burundi.

In the lead up to the September 1961 elections, political violence between PARMEHUTU, APROSOMA, and UNAR members killed hundreds of people and led thousands to flee their homes. The elections and the referendum on the monarchy were held on 25 September. PARMEHUTU won nearly 80 percent of the vote—an improvement since July 1960—while UNAR came second with 17 percent and APROSOMA and RADER secured an inconsequential share. The population also voted overwhelmingly in favor of abolishing the monarchy. In October the PARMEHUTU-dominated Legislative Assembly selected Kayibanda to succeed Mbonyumutwa as president. Rwanda became an independent state on 1 July 1962. A new constitution was adopted but it reflected some of the changes forced by the Gitarama coup; the first 11 articles detailed the republican nature of the new state, emphasising the removal of the monarchy and reiterating the adoption of the new national flag.

== Works cited ==
- Carney, J.J. (2014). Rwanda Before the Genocide: Catholic Politics and Ethnic Discourse in the Late Colonial Era. Oxford University Press USA. ISBN 9780199982271.
- Kamatali, Jean-Marie (2020). Introduction to Rwandan Law. London: Routledge. ISBN 9781000025149.
- Lemarchand, René (1970). Rwanda and Burundi. New York: Praeger Publishers. OCLC 254366212.
- Mayersen, Deborah (2014). On the Path to Genocide: Armenia and Rwanda Reexamined. Berghahn Books. ISBN 9781782382850.
- Nyrop, Richard F.; et al. (1969). Area Handbook for Rwanda. Washington D.C.: U.S. Government Printing Office. OCLC 905626482.
- Stapleton, Timothy J. (2017). A History of Genocide in Africa. Santa Barbara: ABC-CLIO. ISBN 9781440830525.
- Tsuruta, Aya (2017). "Expanding the Archival Horizon: American Archives for Researching Postcolonial Rwandan History". History in Africa. 44: 265–283. doi:10.1017/hia.2017.6. ISSN 1558-2744. S2CID 164408674.
- Webster, John. B. (1964), The Constitutions of Burundi, Malagasy and Rwanda. A Comparison and Explanation of East African French Language Constitutions, Occasional Paper no. 3, Syracuse: Syracuse University, OCLC 846680671
- Weinstein, Warren (1976). Historical Dictionary of Burundi. Metuchen: Scarecrow Press. ISBN 978-0-8108-0962-8.
