= 1958 in Ruanda-Urundi =

- Decades: 1930s; 1940s; 1950s; 1960s
- See also: Other events of 1958

The following lists events that happened during 1958 in Ruanda-Urundi.

== Events ==
=== November ===
- November 17 — The Fourth (Trusteeship) Committee of the UN General Assembly has a hearing with John Kale about the worsening conditions in Ruanda-Urundi.

== Births ==
- Charles Munyaneza — genocide suspect
