= Dominique Mbonyumutwa =

Rwandan president

Interim President of Rwanda
- In office 28 January 1961 – 26 October 1961
- Prime Minister: Grégoire Kayibanda
- Preceded by: Position established
- Succeeded by: Grégoire Kayibanda

Vice President of the Court of Appeals of Rwanda
- In office 30 October 1961 – 30 October 1964

Personal details
- Born: January 1921 Gitarama, Ruanda-Urundi (now Rwanda)
- Died: 26 July 1986 (aged 65) Brussels, Belgium
- Party: MDR-Parmehutu
- Spouse: Sophie Mbonyumutwa
- Profession: Teacher

Dominique Mbonyumutwa (January 1921 – 26 July 1986) was a Rwandan politician who served as the interim first President of Rwanda for a period of nine months in 1961, during a transitional phase between the overthrow of the Rwandan monarchy in the Rwandan Revolution and the country's independence. Following an election in October of that year, he was succeeded by Grégoire Kayibanda who became the first elected president of the country following independence.

== Career ==
Mbonyumutwa rose to prominence in the late 1950s, during a period of instability in Rwanda. At the time, Rwanda was part of the Belgian-administered United Nations trust territory of Ruanda-Urundi. Ethnic divisions between the Tutsi, who held the majority of the political power, and Hutu, who had the majority of the population, began to dominate Rwandan life. Mbonyumutwa was one of the few Hutu subchiefs in Rwanda, and a leader in the Hutu Emancipation Movement Party (Parmehutu) under Grégoire Kayibanda. He had a functioning relationship with the Rwandan King, Mutara III Rudahigwa, but after the King died in July 1959, Mbonyumutwa was in a less stable position.

On 1 November 1959, Mbonyumutwa was assaulted by a group of Tutsi political activists in Byimana in Southern Province. Rumors spread that Mbonyumutwa had died in the attack. This incident triggered the "social revolution" of November 1959. Prior to this, there had never been any systematic political violence between Hutus and Tutsis, but Hutus reacted to the attack with a wave of reprisals against Tutsis. Within a week, self-organized groups of Hutus were committing arson and even murder against their Tutsi neighbors.

On 28 January 1961, during a people's congress which abolished the Rwandan monarchy and proclaimed that Rwanda became a social republic, Mbonyumutwa was chosen as its first President. He traveled around the country for weeks to establish himself as the King's replacement and to shore up support for the new government. The United Nations condemned the new government as "one racist dictatorship [replacing] another" (with Hutus now holding power over the Tutsis), but agreed to oversee a referendum to approve the new government in September. The referendum abolished the monarchy with 80% of the vote, and a simultaneous parliamentary election led to a National Assembly dominated by Parmehutu members. Mbonyumutwa stepped down as interim president, and Grégoire Kayibanda was chosen by the assemblymembers to succeed him.

After stepping down as president, Mbonyumutwa exercised the functions of Magistrate first, then Member of Parliament before holding an honorary position as Chancellor of National Orders in the service of the subsequent president Juvénal Habyarimana until his death on 26 July 1986.

Political offices
| Preceded by King Kigeri V of Rwanda | President of Rwanda; 28 January 1961 – 26 October 1961 | Succeeded by Grégoire Kayibanda |
