= 1973 coup d'état =

In 1973, several notable coup d'états took place:

- 1973 Afghan coup d'état
- 1973 Chilean coup d'état
- 1973 Rwandan coup d'état
- 1973 Uruguayan coup d'état
