= Catholic Church in colonial Rwanda =

Effects of Catholic church in Rwanda during colonial period

The Catholic Church in colonial Rwanda had significant influence over the country as a result of the church's involvement in most aspects of the country's infrastructure. The Catholic missionaries, also known as the White Fathers, arrived at the same time as the first German colonial empire administrators, so both parties were very involved in shaping the influence of colonizers on Rwanda. Throughout the colonial period, the Catholic Church expanded its influence in different industries. The resources of the church improved many Rwandans' lives. However, the church also perpetuated extreme inequality in the country through their favoritism of Tutsis over the other ethnic groups.

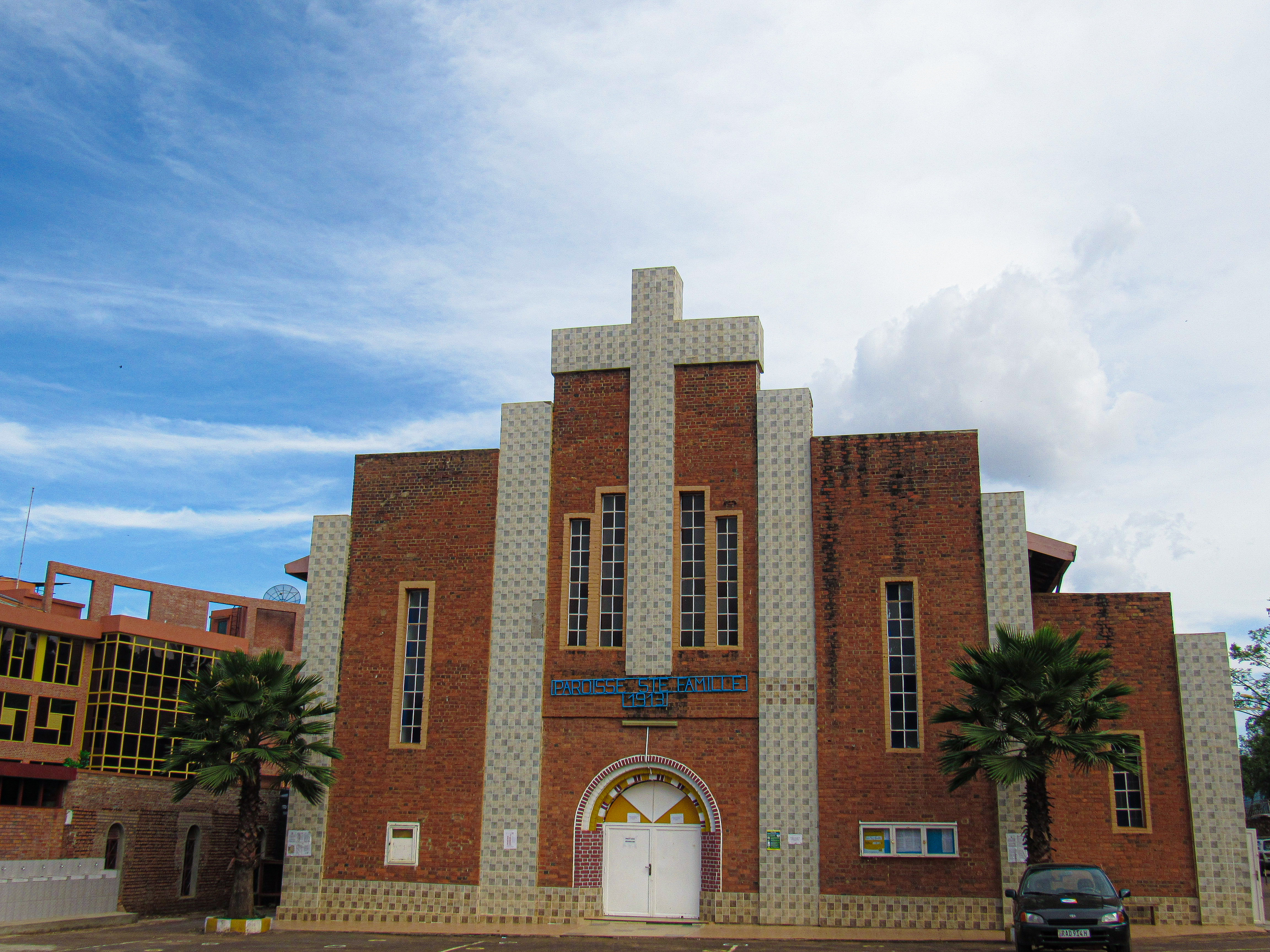
Rwandan Church built during the colonial period in 1913

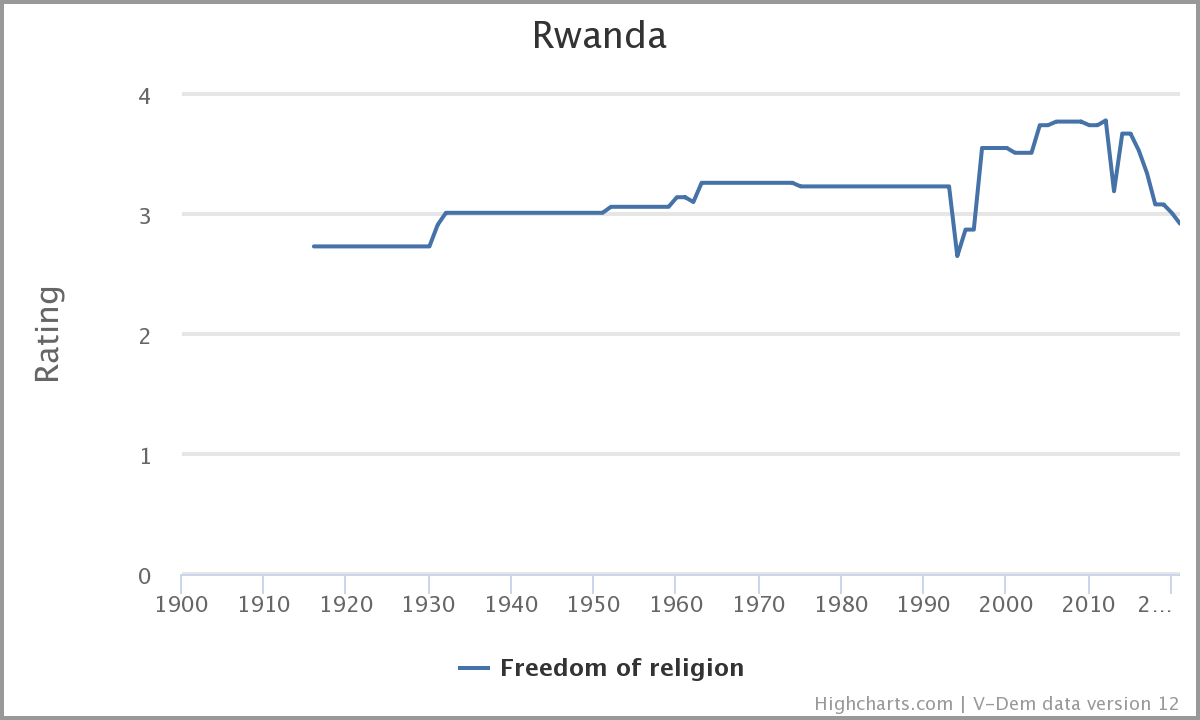
Graph of the level of religious freedom in Rwanda

== Role of religion ==
Compared to many countries around the world, religion is not a major organizer of different groups in Rwanda. According to the 2012 census, the country is 44% Catholic, 38% Protestant, 12% Seventh-day Adventist, and 2% Muslim. As seen in the graph, the country has always enjoyed a high level of religious freedom which partly stems from the lack of a dominant religion in the country. Instead of religion, Rwandans identify much more frequently by their ethnicity and home region.

== Origin of Catholic Church in Rwanda ==
In the pre-colonial era, religion had a large role in the government. The indigenous Rwandan religion considered the king of divine origin and their power of spiritual origin. In addition, Rwandans worshiped many ancestor spirits and minor deities. However, its influence waned as European missionaries entered the country. When the White Fathers accompanied the Germans arrived in the country in the 1890s, they were given responsibility quickly because they had more manpower and planned to stay in the country longer than the Germans. This situation was ideal for the Catholic Church because there was little competition for religious influence within the country as Protestant, Muslim, and other missionaries had not arrived yet. One of the defining events in the early history of the Catholic Church occurred when King Musinga allowed the missionaries to establish a mission station at Kabgayi which is only 50 kilometers from the royal capital in 1905. This station became the center of affairs for the Catholic Church and showed that the church and its influence were there to stay in Rwanda.

== Catholic Church ethnic favoritism ==
The Catholic Church had different perceptions of the three main ethnic groups in Rwanda. They perceived the Tutsi as the most closely related to Europeans and more intelligent, Hutu as simple and hardworking, and Twa as less intelligent and more savage. This hierarchy of favoritism was derived from the Hamitic hypothesis. The hypothesis has multiple variations but the one that the Catholic Church cited in Rwanda stated that the ruling groups of Africa could not have originated from Africa. Therefore, these mobile groups called the Hamites must have come from Europe. The theory continues that the Hamites, who were Caucasian under their black skin, civilized Africa and then were corrupted by its inhabitants. All of the European colonizers considered the Tutsis to be Hamites which they used to justify their favoritism of the Tutsis over other ethnic groups. The church's favoritism resulted in Tutsis getting first access to education and civil service positions. Putting Tutsis in positions of power enabled the ethnic group to stay in power uncontested until after World War II when the Catholic Church began to reverse its favoritism of the Tutsis.

== Catholic Church's spheres of influence ==
Throughout the first part of the 20th century, the Catholic Church expanded its influence by becoming more involved in various industries such as education, distribution, media, leadership, agriculture, and healthcare. These advances gave the Catholic Church more power than the government. By the 1920s, the church has overtaken the king in the political hierarchy. This influence over the king is seen when King Musinga is exiled by the church, in 1931, and replaced by his son King Rudahigwa, who had been baptized and supported the Catholic Church.

=== Education ===
The first Western-style school was established by the White Fathers in 1905 in Nyanza. In the next twenty-five years, the school system became more expansive as more schools were established aimed at educating the sons of Tutsi chiefs. In the early 1930s, government schools were completely phased out and the missions gained control of the schools.

=== Distribution ===
The Catholic Church's extensive connections and resources made it a necessity for many Rwandans. Rwandans sought to work in the church because employment brought social status but also influence over the distribution of resources. The church provided goods, seeds, and healthcare among other things so having influence over who received the goods and services was a coveted position.

=== Media ===
Rwanda's first newspaper was run by the Catholic Church. Controlling the newspapers allowed the church to frame and filter the news to fit their priorities. For Rwandans, working for the Catholic newspaper was a powerful position. For example, Grégoire Kayibanda served as the editor of a Catholic newspaper and then went on to become prime minister then president.

=== Leadership ===
Since the Catholic Church arrived in Rwanda, they have worked with both the colonizer and the Rwandan government. For the Germans, the missionaries monitored the local population and gave the Germans intelligence about potential uprisings. In addition, they became involved in the communities by mediating disputes. Realizing the power and usefulness of the Catholic Church, King Musinga strategically offered the missionaries land on specific hills to help expand his influence.

=== Agriculture ===
The Catholic Church introduced new crops and farming techniques to Rwanda. The support for Rwanda's agriculture was spearheaded by the Catholic Relief Services which helped vulnerable households with agriculture, food security, and nutrition.

=== Healthcare ===
The Catholic Church established health centers to help care for in-need Rwandans. These health centers are an example of programs created with the purpose of helping Rwandans but also the side effect of further making themselves essential to the functionality of the country.

== Catholic Church and the Rwandan Revolution ==
The influx of World War II majorly impacted the Catholic Church in Rwanda. Many missionaries left for their respected countries during the war and returned after. However, upon return, many started to question the inequalities in Rwanda fostered by the Catholic Church. In response, the church shifted many of its policies that favored Tutsis which gave rise to a Hutu counter-elite in the seminaries. With assistance from the Catholic Church, the Hutus realized the mobilizing potential of ethnicity and began to unite together. As a result of the unity and their numerical advantage, the Hutus won many seats in local elections. However, the shift in policies also resulted in increased tension between the ethnics groups which eventually lead to the Rwandan Revolution in 1959.

== See also ==
- Catholic Church in Rwanda
