= Rwandan Revolution =

1959–1961 period of ethnic violence in Rwanda

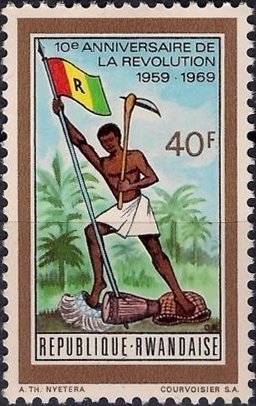
1969 stamp celebrating the 10th anniversary of the Rwandan Revolution, depicting a peasant raising the red-yellow-green Rwandan flag

The Rwandan Revolution, also known as the Hutu Revolution, Social Revolution, or Wind of Destruction (Kinyarwanda: muyaga), was a period of ethnic violence in Rwanda from 1959 to 1961 between the Hutu and the Tutsi, two of the three ethnic groups in Rwanda. The revolution saw the country transition from a Tutsi monarchy under Belgian colonial authority to an independent Hutu-dominated republic.

Rwanda had been ruled by a Tutsi monarchy since at least the 18th century, with entrenched pro-Tutsi and anti-Hutu policies. Germany and Belgium successively controlled Rwanda through the early 20th century, with both European nations ruling through the kings and perpetuating a pro-Tutsi policy. After 1945, a Hutu counter-elite developed, leading to the deterioration of relations between the groups. The Tutsi leadership agitated for speedy independence to cement their power, and the Hutu elite called for the transfer of power from Tutsi to Hutu, a stance increasingly supported by the Catholic Church and the colonial government.

The revolution began in November 1959, with a series of riots and arson attacks on Tutsi homes following an attack on one of the few Hutu sub-chiefs, Dominique Mbonyumutwa, by Tutsi extremists. Violence quickly spread throughout the country. The King and Tutsi politicians attempted a counterattack to seize power and ostracise the Hutu and the Belgians but were thwarted by Belgian colonel Guy Logiest, who was brought in by the colonial governor. Logiest reestablished law and order, beginning a programme to promote and protect the Hutu elite. The Belgians then replaced many Tutsi chiefs and sub-chiefs with Hutu, consigning King Kigeli V to figurehead status; Kigeli later fled the country. Despite continued anti-Tutsi violence, Belgium organized local elections in mid-1960. Hutu parties gained control of nearly all communes, effectively ending the revolution. Logiest and Hutu leader Grégoire Kayibanda declared Rwanda an autonomous republic in 1961, and the country became independent in 1962.

The revolution caused at least 336,000 Tutsi to flee to neighbouring countries, where they lived as refugees. Although the exiles agitated for an immediate return to Rwanda, they were split between those seeking negotiation and those wishing to overthrow the new regime. Some exiles formed armed groups (called inyenzi, or "cockroaches", by the Hutu government), who launched attacks into Rwanda. The largest occurred in late 1963, when a surprise attack approached Kigali. The government fought back, defeating the rebels and killing thousands of the remaining Tutsi in Rwanda. No further threat was posed by the refugees until the 1990s, when a civil war initiated by the Tutsi-refugee Rwandan Patriotic Front (RPF) forced the Hutu government into negotiations. This led to a rise in Hutu extremism and the 1994 genocide, in which over 500,000 Tutsi were killed before the RPF took control.

== Background ==
=== Precolonial Rwanda ===
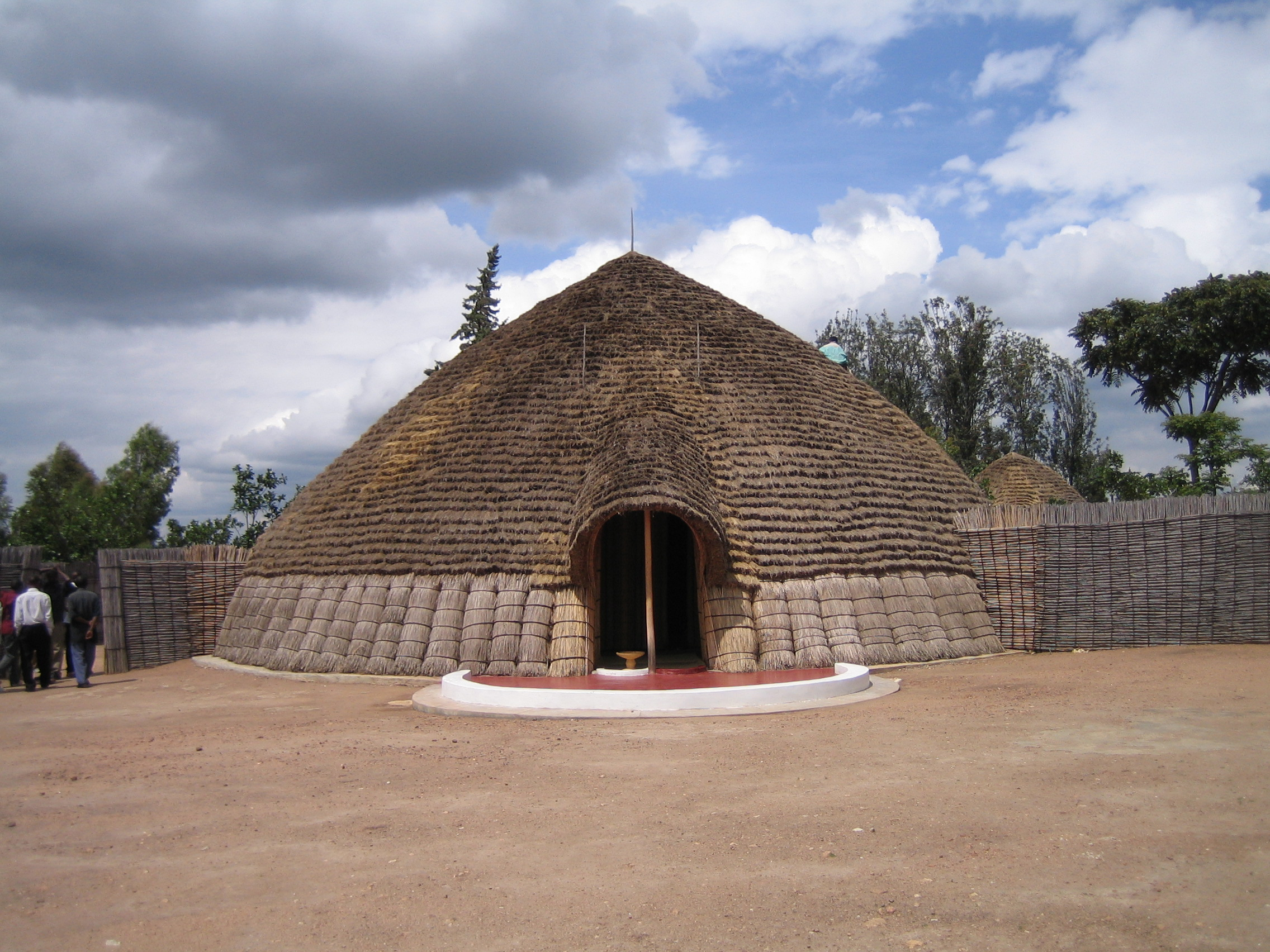
Reconstruction of the King of Rwanda's palace at Nyanza

The earliest inhabitants of what is now Rwanda were the Twa, a group of aboriginal pygmy hunter-gatherers who settled the area between 8000 and 3000 BC and remain in the country today. Between 700 BC and 1500 AD, a number of Bantu groups migrated into Rwanda and began clearing forests for agriculture. After losing much of their homeland, the forest-dwelling Twa moved to the mountains. Historians have several theories about the Bantu Migrations. According to one, the first settlers were Hutu; the Tutsi migrated later and formed a distinct racial group, possibly of Cushitic origin. An alternative theory is that the migration was slow and steady, with incoming groups integrating into (rather than conquering) the existing society. In this theory the Hutu-Tutsi distinction arose later as a class distinction, rather than a racial one.

The population coalesced, first into clans (ubwoko) and into about eight kingdoms by 1700. The country was fertile and densely populated, with its kingdoms strictly controlled socially. The Kingdom of Rwanda, ruled by the Tutsi Nyiginya clan, became increasingly dominant beginning in the mid-18th century. From its origins as a small toparchy near Lake Muhazi the kingdom expanded through conquest and assimilation, reaching its zenith under King (Mwami) Kigeli Rwabugiri between 1853 and 1895. Rwabugiri expanded the kingdom west and north, implementing administrative reforms which included ubuhake (where Tutsi patrons ceded cattle—and privileged status—to Hutu or Tutsi clients in exchange for economic and personal service) and uburetwa (a corvée system in which Hutu were forced to work for Tutsi chiefs). Rwabugiri's reforms developed a rift between the Hutu and Tutsi populations.

=== Colonisation ===
The Berlin Conference of 1884 assigned the territory to Germany, with imprecise boundaries. When Gustav Adolf von Götzen explored the country ten years later, he discovered that the Kingdom of Rwanda included a fertile region east of Lake Kivu. Germany wanted this region, which was also claimed by Leopold II as part of his own Congo Free State (annexed by Belgium to form the Belgian Congo in 1908). To justify its claim, Germany began a policy of ruling through the Rwandan monarchy and supporting Tutsi chiefs; this system allowed colonisation with few European troops. Yuhi V Musinga, who emerged as king after a succession crisis following the death of his father Rwabugiri and a struggle with Belgian troops, welcomed the Germans and used them to consolidate his power. The territory became the western border of German East Africa. German rule allowed Rwabugiri's centralisation policy to continue, and the rift between Tutsi and Hutu deepened. Resistance against this development such as Ndungutse's rebellion were violently crushed, furthering resentment especially in the north.

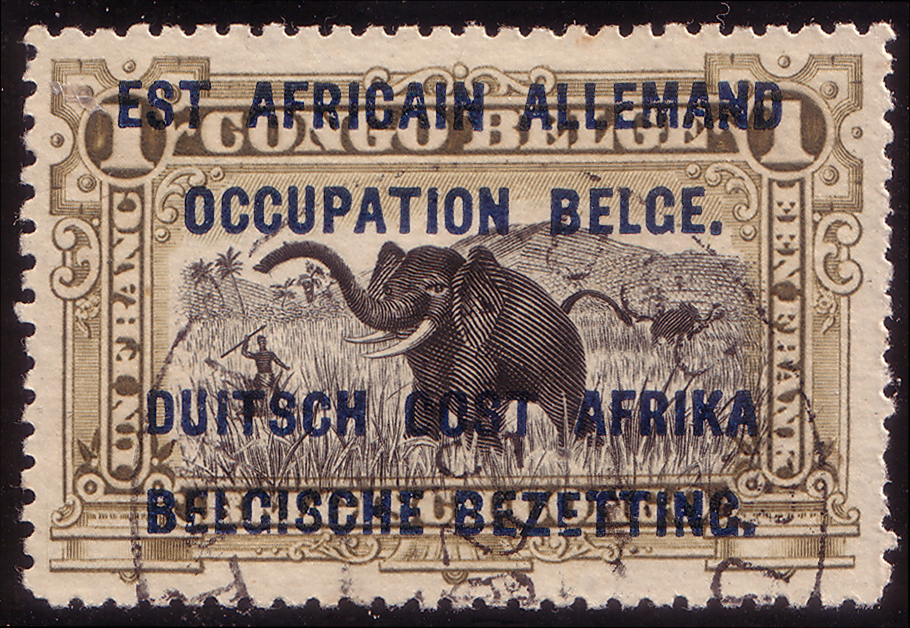
A 1916 postage stamp from the Belgian Occupied East African Territories, captured during the East African campaign in World War I

Belgian forces took control of Rwanda and Burundi during World War I, and the country came under Belgian control in a 1919 League of Nations mandate, named Ruanda-Urundi. Although Belgium initially continued the German method of government through the monarchy, in 1926, it began a policy of direct colonial rule in line with the norm in the Congo. Reforms included simplifying the complex three-chieftain system, so one chief (usually Tutsi) instead of three (typically split between Tutsi and Hutu) ruled a local area. Belgian reforms also extended uburetwa (forced labour by Hutus for Tutsi chiefs) to individuals, not just communities, and to regions not previously covered by the system. Tutsi chiefs began a process of land reform with Belgian support; grazing areas traditionally controlled by Hutu collectives were seized by Tutsi and privatised with minimal compensation.

Beginning in the late 1920s, the role of the Catholic Church grew (see Catholic Church in colonial Rwanda). This was encouraged by the Belgian government, since the priests knew the country well and facilitated its administration. Many Rwandans (including elite Tutsi) converted, since Catholicism was an increasing prerequisite for social advancement. King Musinga refused to convert, and in 1931 he was deposed by the Belgian administration; his eldest son, Mutara III Rudahigwa, succeeded him and eventually became Rwanda's first Christian king. During the 1930s the Belgians introduced large-scale projects in education, health, public works and agricultural supervision, including new crops and agricultural techniques to improve food supply. Though Rwanda was modernised the Tutsis remained in power, leaving the Hutu disenfranchised and subject to large-scale forced labour. In 1935 Belgium introduced identity cards, labelling an individual as Tutsi, Hutu, Twa or Naturalised. Although wealthy Hutu had previously been able to become honorary Tutsi, the identity cards ended further social mobility.

== Prelude ==
=== Hutu counter-elite ===
Belgium continued to rule Rwanda as a UN Trust Territory after World War II, with a mandate to oversee its eventual independence. The economic landscape had changed considerably during the war; a cash economy grew, and with it the demand for labourers in the Congolese mines of Katanga and the coffee and sugar plantations of Uganda. There was a simultaneous shift in the Catholic Church; prominent figures in the early Rwandan church, who were from a wealthy and conservative background (such as Léon-Paul Classe), were replaced by younger clergy of working-class origin. Of these, a greater proportion were Flemish rather than Walloon Belgians and sympathised with the plight of the Hutu. Economic conditions and the seminary education provided by the church gave the Hutu a social mobility not previously possible, allowing the development of an elite group of Hutu leaders and intellectuals. This group, consisting of Hutu from the precolonial Kingdom of Rwanda, was joined by prominent citizens of kingdoms acquired during colonialism (including the Kiga).

The best-known figure in the movement was Grégoire Kayibanda. Like most of the Hutu counter-elite Kayibanda had trained for the priesthood at the Nyakibanda Seminary, although he was not ordained. After completing his education in 1948, he became a primary-school teacher. In 1952 Kayibanda succeeded Alexis Kagame as editor of the Catholic magazine, L'Ami. During the late 1950s he was a Travail, Fidélité, Progrès (TRAFIPRO) food-cooperative board member, edited the pro-Hutu Catholic magazine Kinyamateka, and founded the Mouvement Social Muhutu (MSM).

The second major figure of the Hutu elite was Joseph Gitera, another ex-seminarian based in the south of the country who had left the seminary to establish a small brickworks. Gitera founded the Association for Social Promotion of the Masses (APROSOMA) party. Religious historians Ian and Jane Linden described him as "more passionate and perhaps compassionate" than Kayibanda and other Hutu ex-seminarians, but "often erratic and sometimes fanatical". Unlike Kayibanda, Gitera called for forceful action against the "oppression" of the monarchy as early as 1957; however, his rhetoric focussed less on the Hutu-Tutsi divide than on the emancipation of the poor.

=== Deterioration of Hutu–Tutsi relations ===
The Hutu counter-elite enjoyed reasonable relations with the King and the Tutsi elite in the early 1950s, as the quest for democracy dominated political life. Young Tutsi and Hutu who had been educated in Catholic seminaries or worked in international commerce, came together as "evolués", working in junior roles in the colonial administration. Hutu–Tutsi relations deteriorated rapidly from 1956, however. In July, Congolese newspaper La Presse Africaine published an article by an anonymous Rwandan priest detailing alleged centuries-long abuses of the Hutu by the Tutsi elite. This article was followed up in La Presse Africaine and other Congolese and Burundian newspapers with a series of other articles detailing the history of relations between the groups and the king's status. King Rudahigwa and the Tutsi elite dismissed the claims, retorting that no ethnic impediment to social mobility existed and that the Hutu and Tutsi were indistinguishable. The next catalyst for the breakdown of relations was the occurrence of the country's first democratic elections under universal male suffrage in September 1956. The populace were permitted to vote for the sub-chiefs, and 66% of those elected were Hutu. Higher positions in the traditional and colonial hierarchies were still appointed rather than elected, and these remained overwhelmingly Tutsi. The imbalance between these two weightings highlighted the perceived unfairness of the system for Hutu.

Before 1956, the monarchy and prominent Tutsi had been relaxed about the timeline of independence, convinced that full power would be transferred to them from the Belgians in due course. Alarmed at the growing influence of the Hutu and the tensions between the groups, they began campaigning in late 1956 for a rapid transition to independence. King Rudahigwa and the Tutsi-dominated Conseil Supérieur proposed new ministries of finance, education, public works and the interior run by them, independent of Belgium, through a manifesto called mise en point. The Hutu counter-elite responded swiftly to this development, denouncing it as a plot by the Tutsi to cement Tutsi preeminence in post-independence Rwanda. Kayibanda, with eight other Hutu leaders, began work on an alternative work known as the Bahutu Manifesto. The authors were assisted in writing this document by young Belgian clergymen sympathetic to the Hutu cause. The Bahutu Manifesto criticised indirect Belgian rule, calling for the abolition of ubuhake and the development of a middle class. It was the first document referring to the Tutsi and Hutu as separate races, labelling the Tutsi as "Hamites" and accusing them of establishing a "racist monopoly". The manifesto called for a transfer of power from the Tutsi to the Hutu based on "statistical law". The release of these competing visions for the country's future brought attention from Belgian politicians and the public to Rwanda's social problems which, up until that point, had only been the concern of sociologists and sections of the colonial administration.

In 1958, Gitera visited the King at his palace in Nyanza. Although Gitera had considerable respect for the monarchy, Rudahigwa treated him contemptuously; at one point he grabbed Gitera's throat, calling him and his followers inyangarwanda (haters of Rwanda). This humiliation prompted the MSM, APROSOMA and the pro-Hutu Catholic publications to take a firmer stance against the monarchy. Kinyamateka published a detailed report of Rudahigwa's treatment of Gitera, refuting his semi-divine image and accusing him of pro-Tutsi racism. The magazine also published stories citing the origin myths of the Hutu, Tutsi and Twa, calling the King's policies inconsistent with them. The articles did not immediately challenge the King's authority over the Hutu peasants, but their exposure of Rudahigwa's outburst led to a permanent schism between him, the Hutu counter-elite and Belgian authorities. In 1958 the Belgian colonial ministry tried to strip Rudahigwa of his power, reducing him to a figurehead, but his popularity with the regional chiefs and the Tutsi (who feared the growing Hutu movement) sparked a series of strikes and protests.

=== Death of Rudahigwa and formation of UNAR ===
In early 1959, Belgium convened a parliamentary commission to examine options for democratisation and eventual independence, scheduling elections for the end of the year. With the Belgians and most clergy on his side, Gitera began a campaign targeting Kalinga: the royal drum, one of the monarchy's most potent symbols. Rudahigwa became increasingly fearful, smuggling the drum out of the country and drinking heavily. He died of a cerebral haemorrhage in July 1959 while seeking medical treatment in Usumbura, Burundi. Many Rwandans believed that Rudahigwa was lethally injected by the Belgians; although an autopsy was never performed because of objections from the queen mother, an evaluation by independent doctors confirmed the original diagnosis of haemorrhage. There was also speculation in government spheres that he had committed a ritualistic suicide at the behest of his court historians. The Tutsi elite, believing that Rudahigwa was murdered by the church with the help of the Belgians, immediately began a campaign against both. Rudahigwa's brother Kigeli V Ndahindurwa was installed, without Belgian involvement and against their wishes; Linden and Linden have described this succession as a "minor Tutsi coup".

After Kigeli V's coronation, several Tutsi chiefs and palace officials desiring rapid independence formed the Union Nationale Rwandaise (UNAR) party. Although UNAR was pro-monarchy, it was not controlled by the monarch; the party was anti-Belgian, which attracted support from the Communist bloc. UNAR immediately began a campaign promoting Rwandan nationalism, vowing to replace European history in schools with the study of Rwabugiri's conquests and calling for the removal of whites and missionaries. This rhetoric prompted the Catholic Church (and many of its Rwandan students, who credited the church with raising them from poverty) to call UNAR anti-Catholic. Gitera, in turn, used the church's anti-UNAR stance to falsely claim its support for APROSOMA. The colonial government moved to limit UNAR's power, attempting to depose three chiefs who were prominent in the party and opening fire on protesters at a rally. Kayibanda registered the MSM as an official party, renaming it the Parti du Mouvement de l'Emancipation Hutu (PARMEHUTU). He began mobilising cells of supporters across the country, calling for an independent Hutu state under a constitutional monarchy. Historian Catharine Newbury described the situation in late 1959 as a "simmering cauldron"; by late October, with the parliamentary report due and elections approaching, tensions had reached the breaking point.

== Revolution ==
=== Attack on Mbonyumutwa and Hutu uprising ===
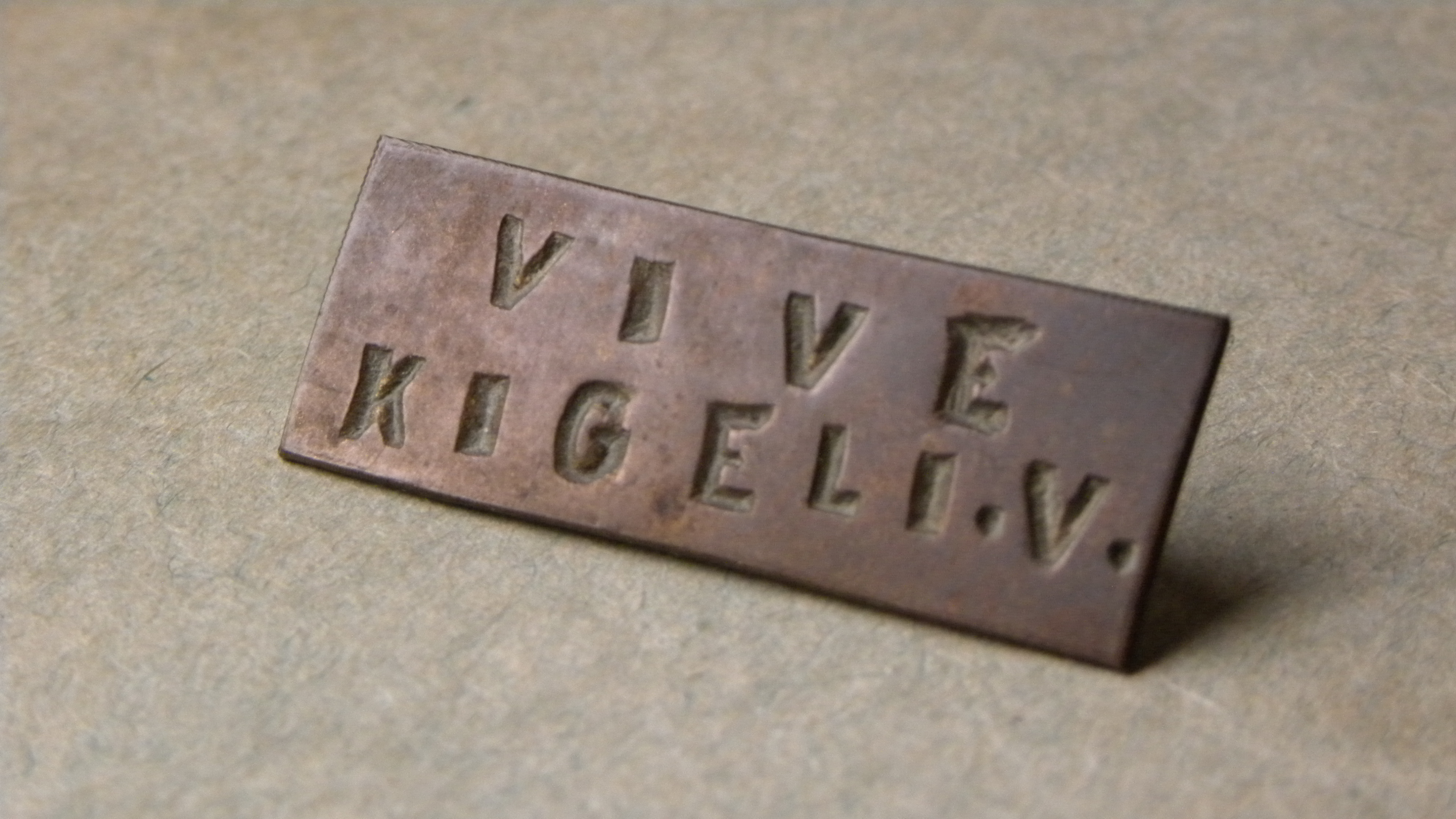
A royalist pin badge with the slogan "Vive Kigeli V" ("Long live Kigeli V") dating to the period of the Rwandan Revolution

On 1 November 1959 Dominique Mbonyumutwa, one of the few Hutu sub-chiefs and a PARMEHUTU activist, was attacked after attending mass with his wife at a church close to his home in Byimana, Gitarama Province. The attackers were nine members of UNAR's youth wing, exacting retribution for Mbonyumutwa's refusal to sign a UNAR protest letter, condemning the Belgian removal of the three Tutsi chiefs. The attackers initially engaged Mbonyumutwa in conversation regarding his increasing influence as a sub-chief, before punching him. Mbonyumutwa fought off the attackers and both he and his wife were able to return safely home, but rumours began to spread that he had been killed; according to American theology professor James Jay Carney, Mbonyumutwa may have started the rumours himself.

The attack on Mbonyumutwa proved to be the catalyst that set off the anticipated violent conflict between Hutu and Tutsi, following the previous months of tension. On 2 November, the day after the attack, a Hutu protest occurred in Ndiza, the home of Athanase Gashagaza, the Tutsi chief who was Mbonyumutwa's direct superior. The protest ended peacefully that day, but on 3 November a larger protest took place in the same location, which turned violent. Hutu vigilantes, declaring themselves "for God, the Church, and Rwanda", killed two Tutsi officials and drove Gashagaza into hiding. Mbonyumutwa was named as his replacement.

The protests quickly turned to riots, with Hutu gangs moving through the district attacking Tutsi homes as they went. The violence at this stage consisting primarily of arson rather than killing, except in cases where the Tutsi tried to fight back. First in Ndiza and then across the country, Hutu burned Tutsi homes to the ground primarily by igniting paraffin, a product widely available in Rwanda for use in lamps. Made homeless, many Tutsi sought refuge in Catholic Church missions and with the Belgian authorities, while others crossed into Uganda and the Congo, beginning what would become a mass exodus by the end of the revolution. The arsonists recruited local peasants to their ranks, ensuring the rapid spread of the revolt. Many Hutu still believed that the King was superhuman, and claimed that they carried out the attacks on his behalf. By 9 November violence had spread across the country, except for Gitera's home province of Astrida (Butare) and the far southwest and east. Rioting was heaviest in the northwest; in Ruhengeri, every Tutsi home was destroyed by fire. (Note: Historian Alison Des Forges regarded the widespread support for the revolution in northern Rwanda as a result of the decades-long resentment of the northerners after their marginalization in the aftermath of Ndungutse's rebellion.)

The initial Belgian response to the violence was muted; the colonial government had just 300 troops in Rwanda in early November, despite the threat of civil war that had escalated through the preceding months. Alphonse van Hoof, a Catholic White Father working in the country, described the Belgian forces as "a few jeeps speeding along the road". Some arsonists were arrested, but the Belgians could not contain the spread of the uprising, and were forced to call in reinforcements from the neighbouring Congo. King Kigeli requested permission to form his own army to combat the violence, but the colonial resident, Andre Preud'homme refused this request. Preud'homme was fearful that allowing the Tutsi to arm would escalate the crisis into full-scale civil war.

Despite this refusal, Kigeli launched a counterattack against the rioters on 7 November, Mobilising thousands of loyal militia, Kigeli ordered the arrest or killing of a number of prominent Hutu leaders in the hope of quashing the peasant revolt; Joseph Gitera's brother, a prominent member of APROSOMA, was among the dead. Many of those arrested were brought to the King's palace at Nyanza, where they were tortured by UNAR officials. Gregoire Kayibanda was in hiding at the time, so was not captured. On 9 and 10 November, Kigeli's troops attacked the hill at Save, close to Astrida, aiming to reach Gitera's home and capture the APROSOMA leader. Gitera responded by assembling his own forces to defend the hill. The King's forces lacked the military expertise to win this battle, and eventually the Belgian authorities intervened in Save to prevent bloodshed, leading to Gitera's escape. Although Kigeli and UNAR remained more powerful and better equipped than the Hutu parties, they knew that the Belgians now strongly supported the latter; given enough time, the Hutu would gain the upper hand. Therefore, UNAR sought to ostracise Belgium from power and gain independence as soon as possible.

=== Arrival of Guy Logiest ===
The November 1959 uprising and the subsequent fighting between Hutu and Tutsi began the revolution, but according to Carney it was the Belgian response which ensured that it would result in a permanent reversal in the role of the two groups, with the Hutu emerging in power. The single biggest decision maker in this response was Colonel Guy Logiest, a Belgian army colonel working in the Congo with the Force Publique. Logiest was a personal friend of Ruanda-Urundi governor Jean-Paul Harroy, and had already been asked, before the start of the revolution, to come to Rwanda to evaluate Belgium's military options in the colony. Following the outbreak of violence, Logiest accelerated his departure from the Congo, arriving in Rwanda on 4 November. Logiest arrived with a number of soldiers and paratroopers and was tasked with re-establishing civil order.

A devout Catholic, and politically social democratic, Logiest decided early on to favour the Hutu in his decision making in the country. This was partly for security reasons, as Logiest claimed that the Hutu would continue the violence as long as the Tutsi remained in power, but he also strongly in favour of the revolution on democratic grounds; he saw it as the opportunity for the "oppressed" Hutu peasants to rise up against the Tutsi ruling class. He later wrote in his memoirs: "Some among my assistants thought that I was wrong in being so partial against the Tutsi and that I was leading Rwanda on a road towards democratisation whose end was distant and uncertain"; but he defended his actions, saying "it was probably the desire to put down the morgue and expose the duplicity of a basically oppressive and unjust aristocracy". After Kigeli and UNAR's retaliation against the Hutu, Logiest and his troops prioritised the protection of Hutu leaders (including Gitera).

On 12 November, after Harroy's declaration of a state of emergency, Logiest was appointed Special Military Resident with a mandate to re-establish order in Rwanda. Sensing that independence was imminent, and that UNAR and the Tutsi leadership had the capability of swiftly forcing a Tutsi-dominated independent kingdom, Logiest pushed the country firmly towards a Hutu republic. He did this with Harroy's support, by installing Hutu in senior administrative positions; more than half the country's Tutsi chiefs (and many sub-chiefs) were replaced with Hutu, most from the PARMEHUTU party. Logiest labelled the appointments "temporary", promising that elections would follow. Although many UNAR members were tried and convicted for crimes committed during the Tutsi counter-revolution, their Hutu compatriots from PARMEHUTU and APROSOMA who were guilty of inciting the Hutu arson escaped without charge. In December Logiest was appointed to the new post of special civil resident, replacing more-conservative Preud'homme. The Belgian government empowered him to depose the King and veto his decisions, which meant Kigeli became a constitutional monarch, with Logiest replacing him as the country's de facto leader.

=== Parmehutu's rise to power ===
The period following Rudahigwa's death in July 1959, and the subsequent Tutsi "coup" against the Belgians, saw Parti du Mouvement de l'Emancipation Hutu (Parmehutu) gain a decisive lead in popularity over Joseph Gitera's Association for Social Promotion of the Masses (APROSOMA), as well as the Tutsi UNAR. APROSOMA favoured an inclusive approach to Rwandan nationalism, at a time when authoritarian Tutsi rule was fueling the anti-Tutsi sentiment among the Hutu. Parmehutu's ascendancy was further enhanced following the November violence, when Guy Logiest appointed interim leaders primarily from that party, allowing them to set the agenda and control the administration of the forthcoming elections. Despite this, Parmehutu claimed it still needed more time for the Hutu people to become "sufficiently emancipated to defend their rights effectively", and successfully lobbied the Belgians to postpone the communal elections scheduled for January 1960. The elections were rescheduled for June of that year. In March 1960, a United Nations delegation visited Rwanda to assess the country's progress towards independence. The major political parties encouraged street demonstrations, which deteriorated into fresh outbreaks of violence, during the UN visit. Tutsi homes were burnt in view of the delegation, leading them to declare in April that Belgian plans for June elections were unworkable. Instead, they proposed a roundtable discussion involving all four political parties to end the violence.

Despite the UN suggestion to postpone the elections, Belgian authorities pressed ahead and they were held in June and July. The result was an overwhelming victory for Parmehutu, which took 160 of 229 seats; Tutsi parties controlled only 19. The communal authorities immediately took local power from the traditional chiefs; many implemented feudal policies similar to that of the Tutsi elite, but favouring Hutu rather than Tutsi. Although after the elections Guy Logiest announced that "the revolution is over", tensions remained high and local massacres of Tutsi continued throughout 1960 and 1961. Kigeli V Ndahindurwa, living under virtual arrest in southern Rwanda, fled the country in July 1960 and lived for several decades in locations across East Africa before settling in the United States.

=== Independence ===
The flag of Rwanda which received independence in 1962

Rwanda settled into the new reality of Hutu dominance after the 1960 elections; Belgium and Logiest supported PARMEHUTU, and Tutsi influence dwindled. The United Nations Trusteeship Commission, dominated by countries allied with Communist ones and favouring the anti-Belgian, Tutsi UNAR party, lobbied for independently monitored elections. The commission sponsored General Assembly resolutions 1579 and 1580, calling for elections and a referendum on the monarchy; Logiest dismissed the efforts as "perfectly useless", and made little effort to implement them. A National Reconciliation Conference was held in Belgium in January 1961, which ended in failure. Logiest and Kayibanda then convened a meeting of the country's local leaders, at which a "sovereign democratic Republic of Rwanda" was proclaimed with Dominique Mbonyumutwa its interim president. The UN published a report that an "oppressive system has been replaced by another one", but its ability to influence events had ended. PARMEHUTU won control of the legislature in September 1961; Kayibanda assumed the presidency, and Rwanda became fully independent on 1 July 1962. The official rhetoric of the government during the independence celebrations placed emphasis on the accomplishments of the revolution, rather than commemorating the end of colonial rule.

== Aftermath ==
=== Tutsi refugees and rebel attacks ===
As the revolution progressed, many Tutsi left Rwanda to escape Hutu purges. The exodus, which began during the November 1959 arson attacks, continued steadily throughout the revolution. An official, late-1964 total of 336,000 Tutsi settled primarily in the four neighbouring countries of Burundi, Uganda, Tanganyika (later Tanzania) and Congo-Léopoldville. The exiles, unlike the ethnic Rwandans who migrated during the pre-colonial and colonial eras, were seen as refugees by their host countries and began almost immediately to agitate for a return to Rwanda. Their aims differed; some sought reconciliation with Kayibanda and the new regime, some affiliated with the exiled King Kigeli and others wished to oust the new PARMEHUTU regime from power and establish a socialist republic.

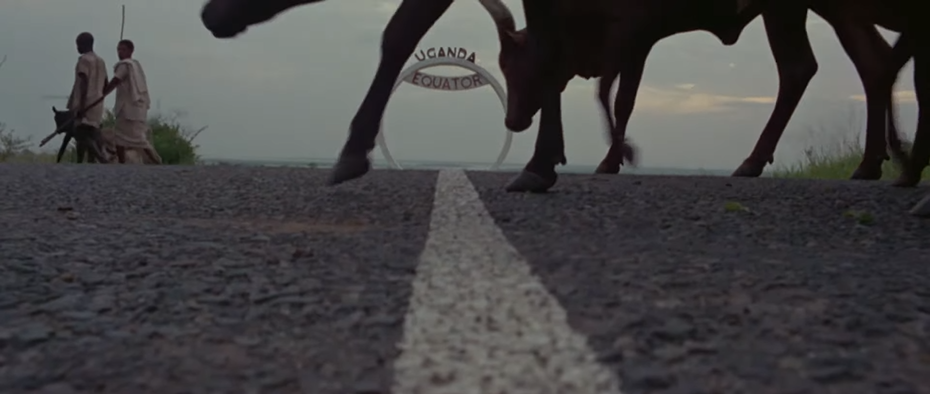
Tutsi refugees fleeing to Uganda with their cattle (January 1964)

Beginning in late 1960 armed groups of Tutsi exiles (called inyenzi or "cockroaches" by the Hutu government) launched attacks into Rwanda from neighbouring countries, with mixed success. The Tutsis in Burundi, supported by that country's newly installed, independent Tutsi republic, caused some disruption in southern Rwanda. The events in Rwanda dramatically worsened Tutsi-Hutu relations in Burundi, and from that point onward the country's Tutsi-led regimes sought to avoid a similar revolution in their own territory. Fear of such a development strongly motivated the Burundian government to massacre thousands of Hutus in 1972 in response to a Hutu uprising, with the participation of some Rwandan Tutsi refugees. Refugees in the Congo, Uganda and Tanzania were less able to organise military operations because of local conditions; exiles in Tanzania were treated well by local authorities and many settled permanently, giving up aspirations to return to Rwanda. The rebel attacks themselves propelled more refugees across the borders, since the government often responded with further attacks on the Tutsi still living in Rwanda.

In December 1963 the Burundi-based rebels launched a large-scale surprise attack, seizing Bugesera and advancing to positions near Kigali. The ill-equipped and poorly-organised invaders were easily defeated by the government, whose response to the attack was the largest killing of Tutsi to date: an estimated 10,000 in December 1963 and January 1964, including all Tutsi politicians still in the country. The international community did little in response, and President Kayibanda's domestic power was reinforced. Infighting and the defeat put an end to the Tutsi rebels, who were of no further threat to Rwanda after 1964.

=== Post-revolution Rwanda ===
After the 1963–64 Tutsi massacre and defeat of the Tutsis, Kayibanda and PARMEHUTU ruled Rwanda unchecked for the next decade, overseeing a Hutu hegemony justified by the mantra of "demographic majority and democracy". The regime did not tolerate dissent, ruling in a top-down manner similar to the pre-revolution feudal monarchy and promoting a deeply Catholic, virtuous ethos. By the early 1970s this policy had isolated Rwanda from the rest of the world, and a rebellion began within the Hutu elite. In 1973 senior army commander Juvénal Habyarimana organised a coup, assuming the presidency and ultimately killing Kayibanda.

In 1990 the Rwandan Patriotic Front (RPF), a rebel group composed primarily of Tutsi refugees, invaded northern Rwanda; this began the Rwandan Civil War. Although neither side gained a decisive advantage in the war, by 1992 Habyarimana's authority had weakened; mass demonstrations forced him into a coalition with the domestic opposition and to sign the 1993 Arusha Accords with the RPF. The cease-fire ended on 6 April 1994, when Habyarimana's plane was shot down near Kigali Airport and he was killed. Habyarimana's death was the catalyst for the Rwandan genocide, which began a few hours later. In about 100 days, 500,000 to 1,000,000 Tutsi and politically-moderate Hutu were killed in well-planned attacks ordered by the interim government. The RPF under Paul Kagame restarted their offensive and methodically regained Rwanda, controlling the whole country by mid-July. As of 2023 Kagame and the RPF remain in control, restoring growth in Rwanda's economy, its number of tourists and the country's Human Development Index.

== See also ==
- History of Burundi
- History of Rwanda
- La Violencia, a ten-year civil war in Colombia from 1948 to 1958
- Congo Crisis (1960–65)
- Kingdom of Burundi
- Burundian Genocides (1972 and 1990–94)
