= 1960 in Ruanda-Urundi =

- Decades: 1940s; 1950s; 1960s
- See also: Other events of 1960

The following lists events that happened during 1960 in Ruanda-Urundi.

== Events ==
=== December ===
- December 20 — the Diocese of Ruhengeri is erected by Pope John XXIII.

=== Uncertain date ===
- The Ruanda-Urundi franc is first established.
- Parmehutu begins a Hutu uprising causing the killing and fleeing of many Tutsis.

=== Ongoing ===
Rwandan Revolution (1959–1961)
