= Emmanuel Bushayija =

Titular King of Rwanda since 2017

Yuhi VI
- King of Rwanda (title)
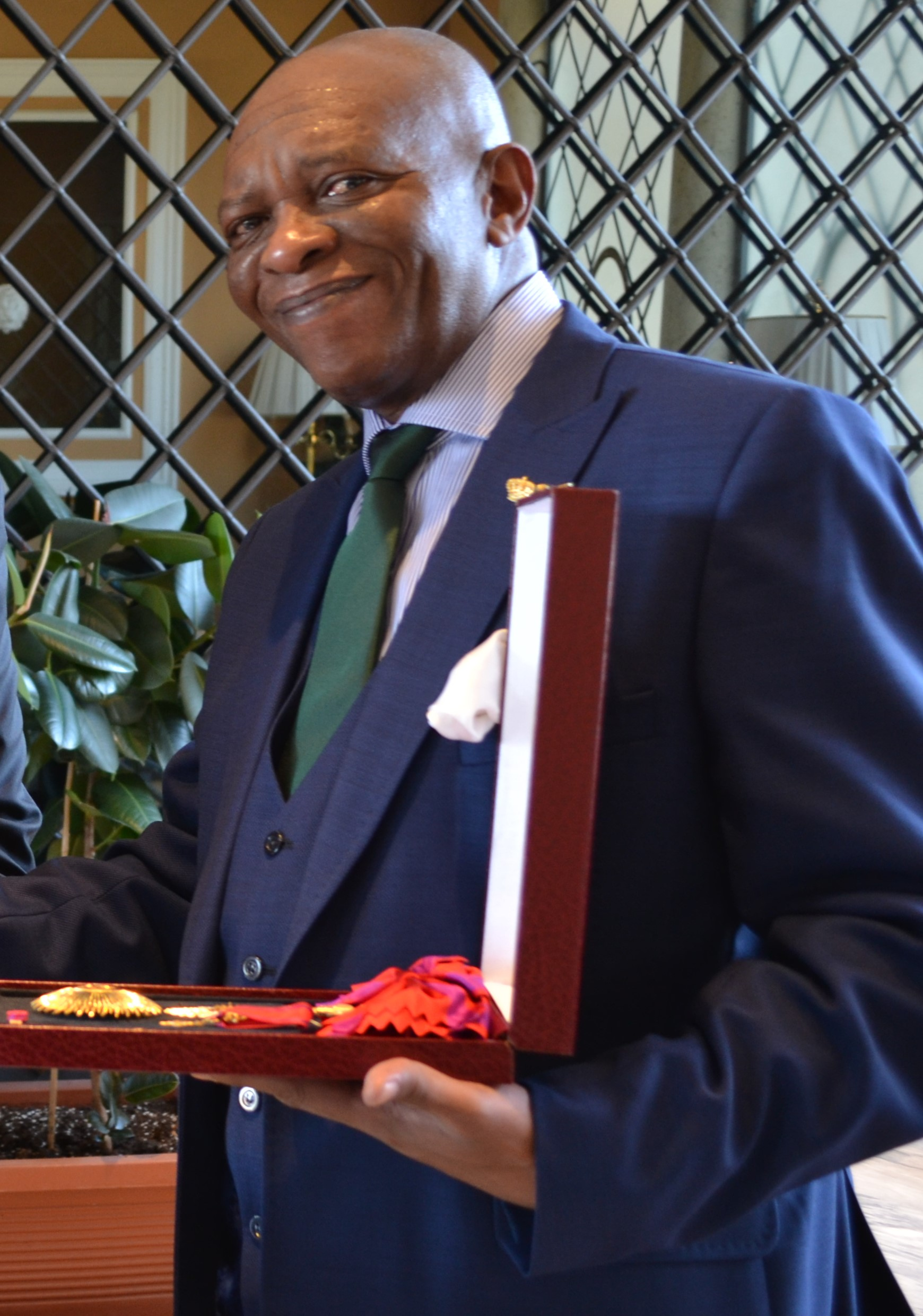
- Bushayija in 2017
- Born: Emmanuel Bushayija; 20 December 1960 (age 65); Ruanda-Urundi
- Spouse: Lilian
- Issue: Two sons and a daughter
- Father: Prince William Bushayija

Emmanuel Bushayija (born 20 December 1960) is the claimant to the historical Kingdom of Rwanda, which was abolished in 1961. He was proclaimed the ceremonial successor to the royal title (Mwami) on 9 January 2017 under the reign name Yuhi VI by the Abiru, the privy council of the Rwandan monarchy. He succeeded his late uncle King Kigeli V and is a grandson of King Yuhi V.

== Biography ==
He grew up in exile in Uganda, where he studied at Iganga Secondary School and worked for Pepsi Cola in Kampala.

He also lived in Kenya, working in the tourism industry, before returning to Rwanda in July 1994 before moving to the United Kingdom six years later.

The accession of Yuhi VI was made by proclamation of the Royal Council of Abiru, who are a group of elders and privy to the king's wishes as advisors. According to custom, the Council of Abiru announces the king’s selection of successor from among his family members. Bushayija, his nephew, was named as his successor. The announcement was made by Boniface Benzinge, chairman of the Royal Council of Abiru. The announcement was criticised by some who disputed the validity of the succession. As far as the Kigali government is concerned there can be no new king because "Rwanda is a republic governed by a constitution and ceased to be a monarchy many years ago".

He is a naturalised British citizen and lives currently in Sale, near Manchester in northwest England. His wife, Lilian, is a local mental health support worker.

== Achievements as King ==
Yuhi VI has been active in the Royal Commonwealth Society and serves as the Chief Patron of The Crown Society. He is regularly seen in European royal and aristocratic circles, and has conducted visits to strengthen ties with the royal houses of Albania, Austria, Portugal and Spain. A close relationship has developed with the House of Braganza, which was historically supportive of Kigeli V Ndahindurwa and played a key role in welcoming Yuhi VI into royal circles. He is also a founding member of the Royal Club, an institution headquartered at Raffles The Palm Dubai under the patronage of several royal and imperial families to host cultural, social, academic and philanthropic events to preserve centuries-old honourable traditions and to provide assistance to the developing world.

He attended an event in Manila, where he was feted as one of the laureates of the 2025 Sino-Phil Asia International Peace Awards in the field of humanitarianism. Subsequently, a visit to Macau followed where he was the guest of honour at the signing ceremony for the Medical Simulation Training Centre Pilot Program, a partnership between the Faculty of Medicine at Macau University of Science and Technology, the Global Fair Pay Foundation, and The First Affiliated Hospital, Sun Yat-sen University. The Asia tour concluded in Hong Kong, where he was hosted by the Royal Commonwealth Society Hong Kong Branch which convened a white tie dinner in His Majesty's honour.

=== Honours ===
==== Other Dynastic ====
- Grand Cordon of the Royal and Hashemite Order of the Pearl (Royal House of Sulu)

Emmanuel Bushayija House of Ndahinduraa Born: 20 December 1960
Titles in pretence
| Preceded by Kigeli V of Rwanda | — TITULAR — King of Rwanda; 9 January 2017 – present Reason for succession failure: Monarchy dismantled in 1962, coup d'etat | Incumbent |
