= Royal and Hashemite Order of the Pearl =

- Coat of Arms
- Type: Dynastic Order
- Awarded for: Meritorious service in support of the Royal House or other distinguished and respected contributions of international renown; awarded at the pleasure of the Sultan.
- Country: Royal Sultanate of Sulu (Philippines)
- Presented by: Royal House of Sulu
- Status: Currently constituted
- Established: 2011
- Website: http://sultanateofsulu.ecseachamber.org/the-order-of-the-pearl/index-1.htm
- Ribbon of the Order

The Royal and Hashemite Order of the Pearl is the dynastic order of the Royal House of Sulu, which serves as the premier institution and the highest personal honour of and in the Royal Sultanate of Sulu. The order is an honourable and nobiliary corporation instituted as a dynastic Order of Datuship analogous to traditional dynastic orders of chivalry, and is in direct continuation from the ancient customs and distinctions of the Royal Sultanate of Sulu and the Court of the Sultan. Ampun Sultan Muedzul Lail Tan Kiram, as Head of the Royal House of Sulu, is the hereditary sovereign who processes the fons honorum and Grand Sayyid of the order, and his heirs and successors as heads of the Royal House of Sulu, shall ever be sovereigns and Grand Sayyids of the order.

== Original founding ==
In his care for preservation of the ancient customs of the Sultanate and the values of the nation, Ampun Sultan Muedzul Lail Tan Kiram in 2011 used his sovereignty right of fons honorum to create an Order, thus developing the traditional honours of the Royal court in a form accepted internationally. Developed as a dynastic order, the Order follows the tradition of many chivalric orders developed in Europe, while maintaining the traditions and customs unique to Sulu. In establishing a dynastic order, the Sultan holds exclusive control of the Order and it is semi-independent from the political entity of the Royal Sultanate of Sulu.

Despite territorial sovereignty being limited for many years, the Sultan and the Sultanate do have a form of legally recognized sovereignty within the Republic of the Philippines. The Sultan is formally recognized at the national level, as in 1974 the Philippine government had officially recognized the continued existence of the Royal Sultanate of Sulu and the Sultan as the legitimate heir.

The Philippine government, in a 1974 executive order, outlined that "the Government has always recognized the Sultanate of Sulu as the legitimate claimant to the historical territories of the Republic of the Philippines" and that "the Government [had] the obligation to assist in the confirmation of Sultan Mahakuta Itiram as the 29th Sultan of Sulu succeeding his father, the late Mohammad Ismael Kiram."

== Membership ==
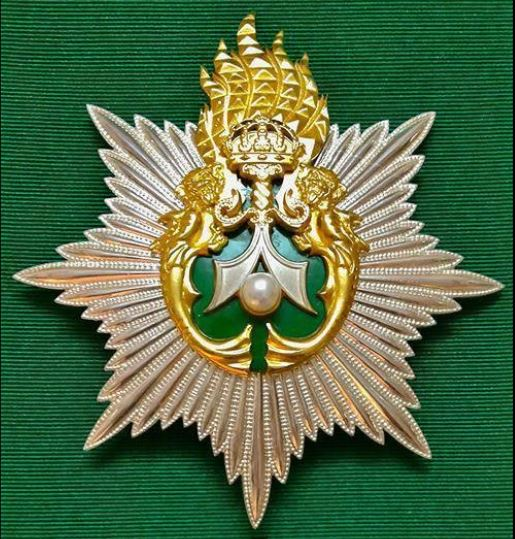
Breast Star, Royal Order of the Pearl

Membership within the Order is conferred upon those who have performed worthy and meritorious service of an exceptional level for the Royal House of Sulu; upon those of any nationality who, in any field of endeavour, have become distinguished and respected figures of international renown by virtue of their celebrated activities; and upon those who have performed loyal and faithful service to the Royal House and its members.

The grades of the Order are:

- Royal Companion (RCPS)
- Grand Cordon (GCPS)
- Distinguished Companion (DCPS)
- Companion (CPS)
- Officer (OPS)
- Member (MPS)

== Notable members ==
Some of the more notable people who have accepted membership in the Order of the Pearl are:

- Hussin Ututalum Amin, Mayor of Jolo
- Duarte Pio, Duke of Braganza
- Mwami Yuhi VI of Rwanda
- Mwami Kigeli V Ndahindurwa of Rwanda
- Archduke Karl von Habsburg
- Prince Alexandar Pavlov Karageorgevich of Serbia and Yugoslavia
- Princess Jelisaveta Karageorgevich of Serbia and Yugoslavia
- Rukirabasaija Agutamba Solomon Gafabusa Iguru I, Omukama of Bunyoro-Kitara (Uganda)
- Dufia Togbe Osei III of Gbi-Godenu (Ghana)
- Crown Prince Davit Bagrationi Mukhran Batonishvili of Georgia
- Prince Ermias Sahle-Selassie, Imperial Prince of Ethiopia
- Lech Wałęsa, former President of Poland

== Heraldry ==
Members of the Order of the Pearl have the option to display their membership in various ways on their coat of arms, as prescribed by the Gateway Chronicler King of Arms. As depicted in the figure below, each grade of member is allowed to display the insignia of the Order in a manner befitting such grade:

- Members of the Paramount Class encircle their arms with the Collar of the Order. Members of this class may elect to instead encircle their arms with the Order's Paramount Class sash (a bowed ribbon sash with a unique oval badge) with a flame just above the badge..
- Grand Cordons encircle the shield with Order's Grand Cordon sash (a bowed ribbon sash with the crowned Order badge).
- Distinguished Companions encircle their arms with the neck decoration of their grade (a neck ribbon with the crowned Order badge). The ribbon may display a flame just above the badge.
- Companions encircle their arms with the neck decoration of their grade (a neck ribbon with the crowned Order badge).
- Officers include the medal of their grade below the shield (a medal ribbon with the crowned Order badge).
- Members include the medal of their grade below the shield (a medal ribbon with the uncrowned Order badge).

Those in the two highest ranks (Paramount Class and Grand Corden) are allowed to bear heraldic supporters through the Gateway Chronicler King of Arms, the official responsible for regulating heraldry for the Royal House of Sulu. A widow of a member was not granted supporters, but was otherwise entitled to them, may petition for them posthumously.

Those in the three highest ranks (Paramount Class, Grand Cordon, and Distinguished Companion) may include the star of the Order behind their coats of arms.

== Honorific Title ==
No specific courtesy titles are awarded to Members of the Order but those belonging in the upper class who are either a Distinguished Companion or a Grand Cordon are permitted to use conventional honorific titles such as "The Honorable" or "Excellency". Royal Companion Members normally have their own customary titles of nobility but some notable members may also be awarded the senior nobility title of "Datu Sadja" which is exclusively granted by the Sultan. Conferring of customary titles is protected under the Rules and Regulations of the Indigenous Peoples Rights Act of 1997, allowing indigenous cultural communities, including the Sultanate of Sulu, "to preserve and protect their culture, traditions and institutions."

== See also ==
- Sultanate of Sulu
- Royal House of Sulu
