= 1969 Rwandan general election =

- 29 September 1969
- Presidential election
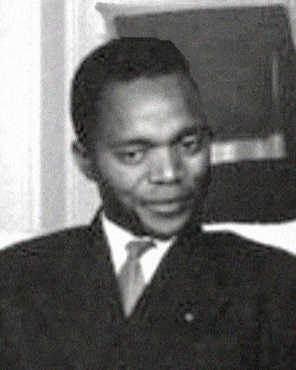
| Nominee | Grégoire Kayibanda |
| Party | MDR-Parmehutu |
| Popular vote | 1,426,159 |
| Percentage | 100% |
President before election
Grégoire Kayibanda
MDR-Parmehutu
Elected President
Grégoire Kayibanda
MDR-Parmehutu

General elections were held in Rwanda on 29 September 1969. At the time, the country was a one-party state with MDR-Parmehutu as the sole legal party. Its leader, Grégoire Kayibanda, ran unopposed in the presidential election. Voter turnout was 90.9%.

== Electoral system ==
The 47 members of the National Assembly elections were elected in ten multi-member constituencies. Voters could approve the entire MDR-Parmehutu list, or give a preferential vote to a single candidate.

== Results ==
=== President ===
| Candidate | Party | Votes | % |
|---|---|---|---|
| Grégoire Kayibanda | MDR-Parmehutu | 1,426,159 | 99.96 |
| Against | | 542 | 0.04 |
| Total | | 1,426,701 | 100.00 |
| Valid votes | | 1,426,701 | 99.42 |
| Invalid/blank votes | | 8,276 | 0.58 |
| Total votes | | 1,434,977 | 100.00 |
| Registered voters/turnout | | 1,578,704 | 90.90 |
Source: Nohlen et al.

=== Legislative Assembly ===
| Party | Votes | % | Seats | +/– |
|---|---|---|---|---|
| MDR-Parmehutu | 1,426,701 | 100.00 | 47 | 0 |
| Total | 1,426,701 | 100.00 | 47 | 0 |
| Valid votes | 1,426,701 | 99.42 | | |
| Invalid/blank votes | 8,276 | 0.58 | | |
| Total votes | 1,434,977 | 100.00 | | |
| Registered voters/turnout | 1,578,704 | 90.90 | | |
Source: Sternberger et al.
