= Kigeli V Ndahindurwa =

King of Rwanda from 1959 to 1961

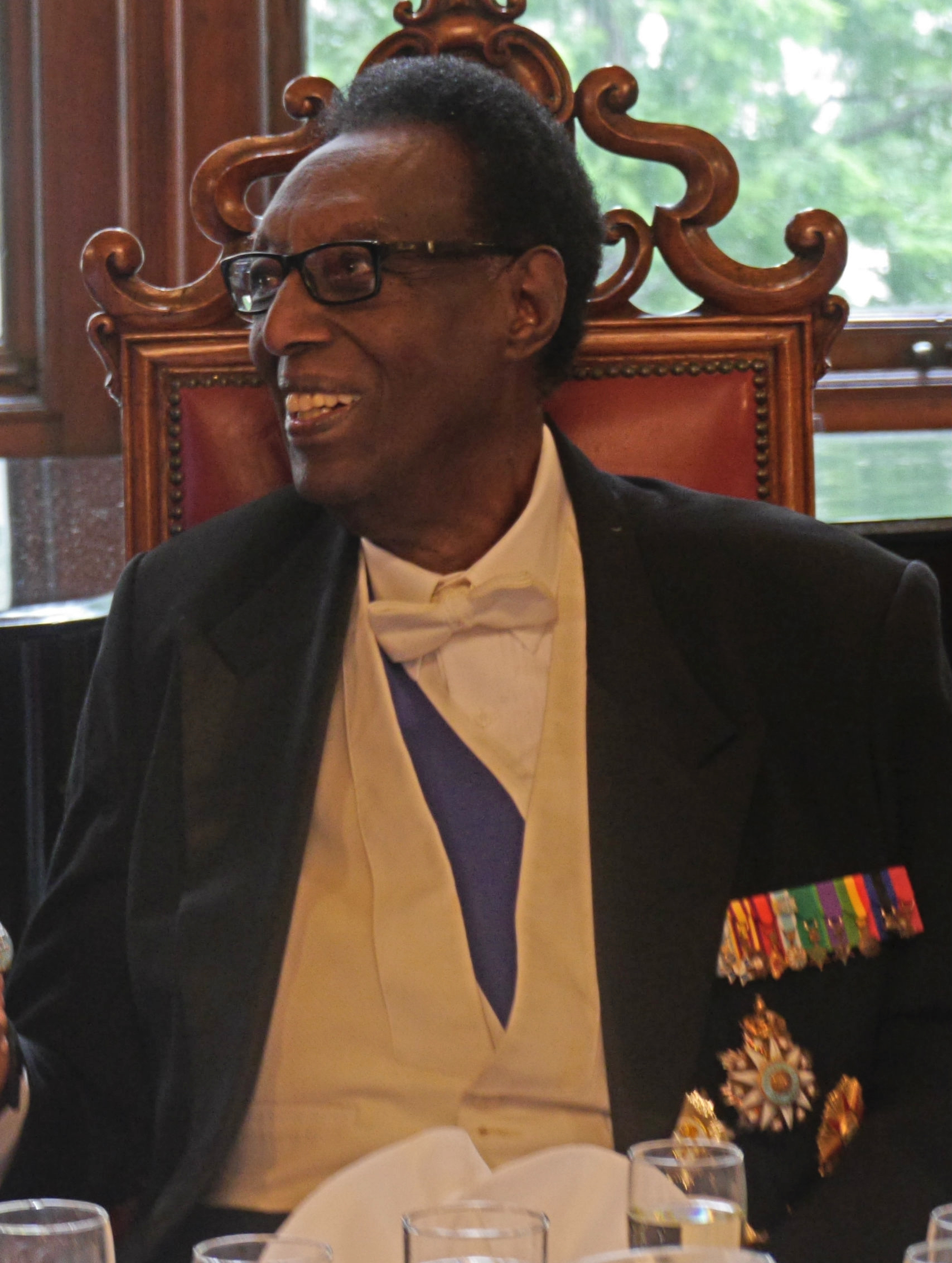
- Kigeli V shortly before his death, at the National Liberal Club in London

Mwami of Rwanda
- Reign: 28 July 1959 – 28 January 1961
- Predecessor: Mutara III Rudahigwa
- Successor: Yuhi VI (in pretense)
- Born: 29 June 1936; Kamembe, Ruanda-Urundi
- Died: 16 October 2016 (aged 80); Washington D.C., U.S.
- Burial: 15 January 2017; Nyanza District, Rwanda
- Clan: Abanyiginya
- Father: Yuhi V Musinga
- Mother: Mukashema Bernadette
- Religion: Catholicism

Kigeli V Ndahindurwa (born Jean-Baptiste Ndahindurwa; 29 June 1936 – 16 October 2016) was the last ruling King (Mwami) of Rwanda, from 28 July 1959 until the end of the UN-mandate with Belgian administration and the declaration of an independent Republic of Rwanda 1 July 1962. On 25 September 1961, a referendum voted for the abolition of the Rwandan monarchy following the Rwandan Revolution.

After a brief period of moveabouts after leaving Rwanda, the titular King lived in exile during the final part of his life in the town of Oakton, Virginia, in the United States. In exile, he was known for heading the King Kigeli V Foundation, an organisation promoting humanitarian work for Rwandan refugees. He was also notable for his activities in maintaining the dynastic, cultural heritage of his formerly reigning royal house, including noble titles, dynastic orders of chivalry and other distinctions.

After the king's death, a successor was said to be shortly revealed. In January 2017, it was announced that Yuhi VI would succeed him. Yuhi VI is the nephew of both the late King Kigeli V and the previous King Mutara III, as well as a grandson of King Yuhi V.

== Early life and education ==
Kigeli was born Ndahindurwa on 29 June 1936 in Kamembe, Rwanda, to Yuhi Musinga (the deposed King Yuhi V Musinga), and Queen Mukashema (born Mukashema Bernadette), the seventh of his eleven wives. He was ethnically Tutsi. Kigeli had fourteen siblings, being one of the youngest of his father's many children.

When Kigeli was 4 years old, his father was exiled by the Belgian government to Moba, in the Democratic Republic of Congo. Following the death of his father, in 1944 he returned to Rwanda. Kigeli was baptised in the Catholic Church in his teens, taking the Christian name Jean-Baptiste, and remained a devout Catholic throughout his life.

He received his education at the Groupe Scolaire Astrida (now Groupe Scolaire Officiel de Butare) in Rwanda, and at the Nyangezi College in the modern-day Democratic Republic of the Congo. After he finished school in 1956, he worked in local government in Rwanda until 1959.

== Reign in Rwanda ==
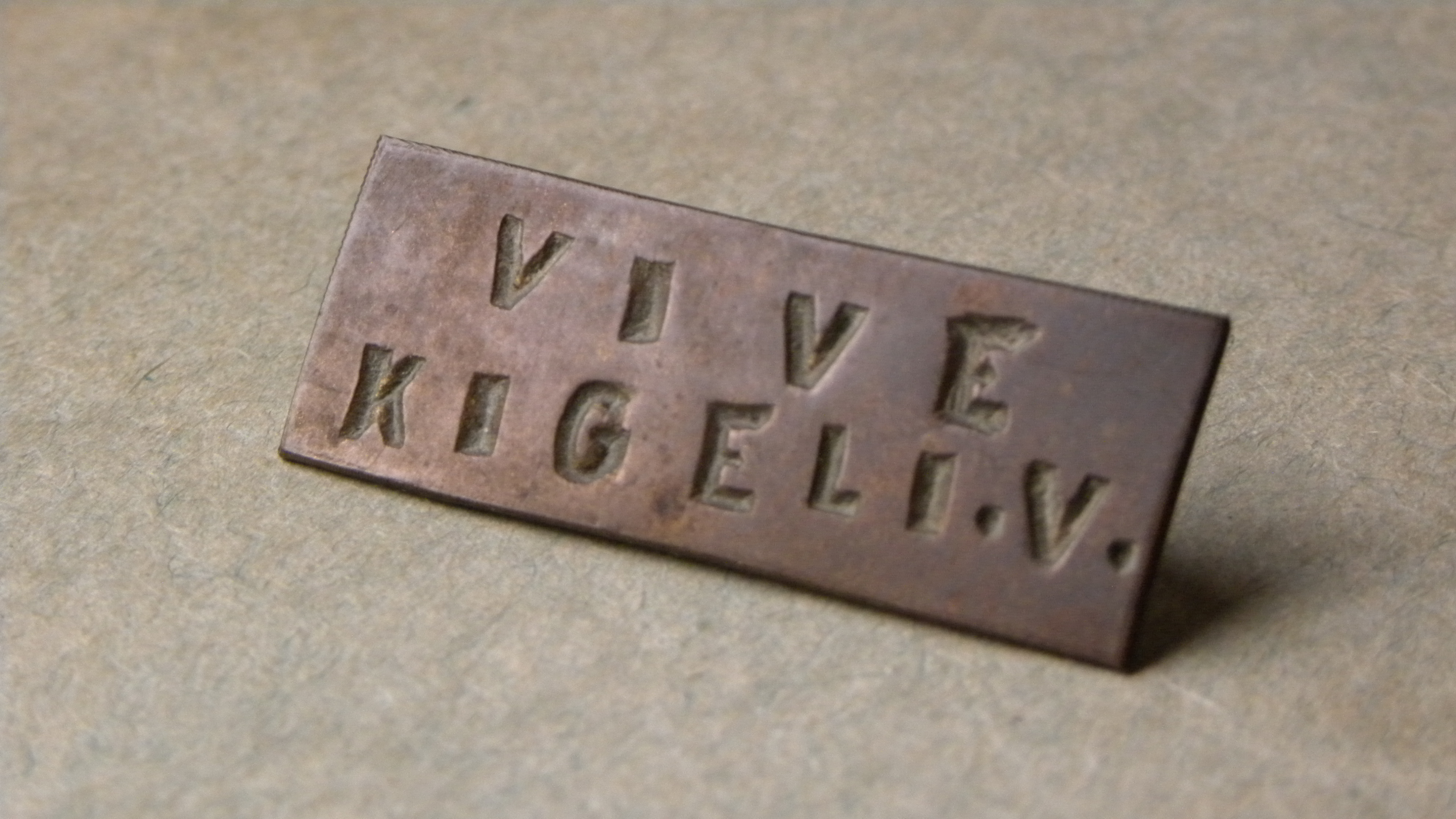
Brass lapel pin Vive Kigeli V "Long Live Kigeli V"

After his half-brother, King Mutara III Rudahigwa, died under mysterious circumstances on 25 July 1959, it was announced on 28 July that Kigeli would succeed him as King Kigeli V Ndahindurwa. "Kigeli" is sometimes transcribed as "Kigeri". Though married, Kigeli's late half-brother had had no children; the abrupt, shocking nature of the death prompted widespread talk of some kind of assassination having occurred.

Kigeli's appointment was a surprise to the Belgian administration, who were not involved in his selection, and who described the event as a coup d'état, a view shared by the newly politically empowered Hutu elite. Kigeli himself also felt shocked and overwhelmed at the news of his ascension. The tense atmosphere and presence of armed Rwandans at the funeral prevented the Belgians from objecting, as well as preventing Hutu interference. Despite this, Kigeli was initially favoured by all sides: Tutsi traditionalists, Hutu nationalists, and the Catholic clergy all felt optimistic on his appointment. However, the manner of his appointment led to a loss of prestige for the Belgian authorities, and gave both Hutu and Tutsi revolutionaries the impression that violence might further their goals. The fact that the Tutsi establishment had engineered the rise to power also compromised Kigeli's ability to act in the traditional role as a neutral arbiter of differing factions.

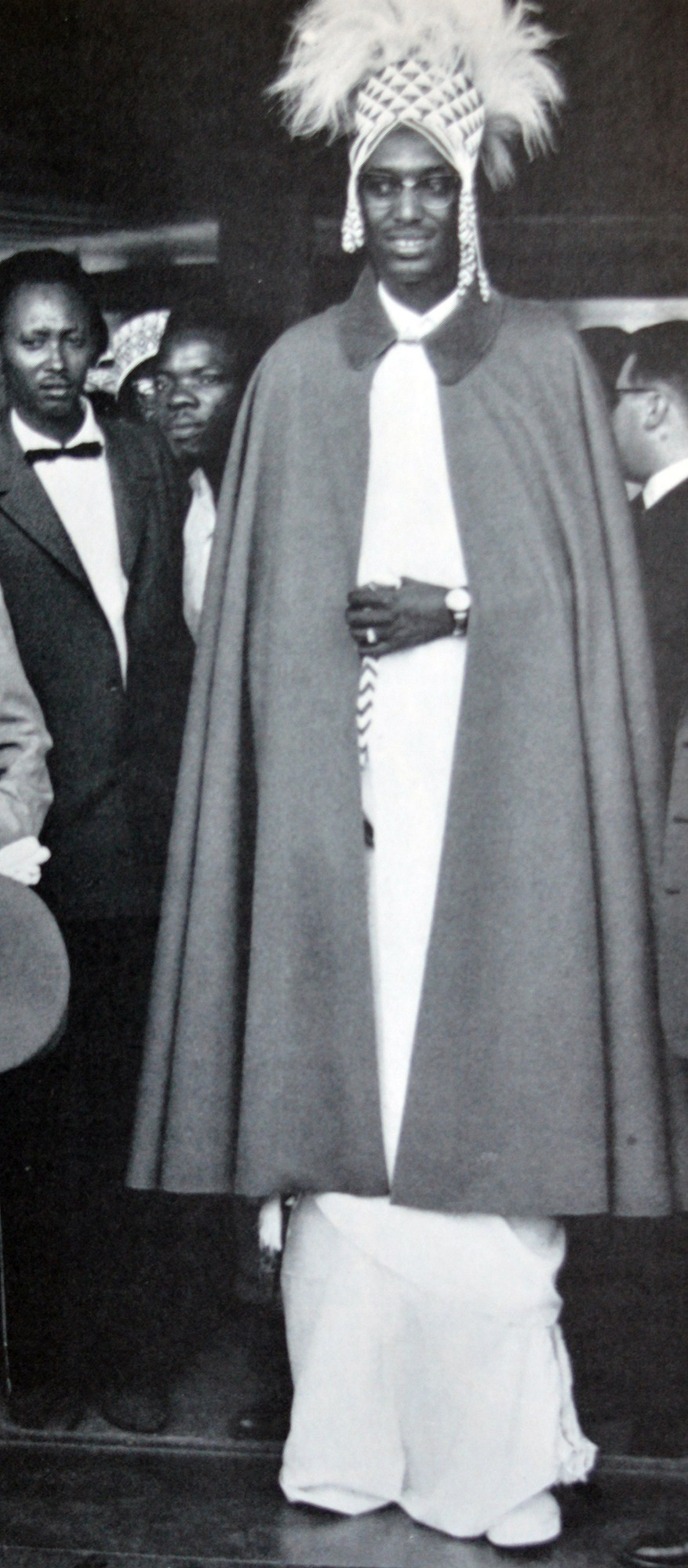
Kigeli V in 1961

Kigeli duly followed regal tradition by disregarding past ethnic and ideological affiliations, embracing the role of the 'father of all Rwandan people'. However, political instability and tribal conflict grew despite efforts by the monarchy and others. Only a month after Kigeli's November 1959 ascension, Hutu versus Tutsi militancy increased to the point that hundreds died. Many Tutsi went into exile. Issues with the increasingly restive Hutu population were encouraged by the Belgian military, promoting widespread revolt. Kigeli later wrote, "I am not clinging to power... I will always accept the people’s verdict; what I cannot accept is that the Belgian Administration should influence or distort this verdict."

In July 1960, Kigeli sought safe haven in the newly independent nation of Congo. In 1961, Kigeli was in Kinshasa to meet Secretary General of the United Nations Dag Hammarskjöld when Dominique Mbonyumutwa, with the support of the Belgian government, led a coup d'état that took control of the Rwandan state. The monarchy's rule was formally overthrown on 28 January 1961. The coup resulted in the 1961 referendum about the fate of the nation's royal system.

The election results showed that, with about 95% turnout, around 80% of voters opposed the continuation of the monarchy. Kigeli criticized the affair as rigged; soon after re-entering Rwanda prior to the election, Belgian officials put him under house arrest.

The government officially deported Kigeli to what is now Tanzania on 2 October 1961. He subsequently lived in multiple other locations, leaving the region of Tanganyika (living in Dar es Salaam) for places such as Kampala, Uganda, and Nairobi, Kenya. He was granted political asylum in the United States in July 1992. He resided in the U.S. for the rest of his life.

== Exile activities ==
Granted political asylum by the United States, he settled near Washington, D.C., where he claimed welfare, and lived in subsidized housing. He subsequently settled in Oakton, Virginia in Northern Virginia.

He travelled internationally to speak on behalf of the Rwandan people and repeatedly called for peace and harmony between the different groups. Kigeli continued to remember the victims of the genocide against the Tutsi in Rwanda and attempted to reconcile all political, ethnic, and religious parties in Rwanda to use the democratic process to solve any disputes. Kigeli was a friend of former South African president Nelson Mandela and Congolese prime minister Patrice Lumumba.

In 1995, while in Southern California, Kigeli met author and historian Charles A. Coulombe, an American representative of the International Monarchist League, a London-based organization that attempts to reinstate deposed royalty in various parts of the world.

In an August 2007 BBC interview, Kigeli expressed an interest in returning to Rwanda if the Rwandan people were prepared to accept him as their constitutional monarch. He said that he had met President Paul Kagame and that Kagame had told him that he and his family were free to return, but Kigeli said that in order to do so, he needed to know if the people still wanted him to be king. According to Kigeli, Kagame said that he would consult the government about the issue.

=== Charity ===
He was the head of the King Kigeli V Foundation, whose mission is to bring humanitarian initiatives on behalf of Rwandan refugees.

== Death and succession ==
Kigeli died of a heart ailment at age 81 on the morning of 16 October 2016 in a hospital in Washington, D.C. His private secretary, Guye Pennington, said that an heir had been chosen and would be announced shortly. Kigeli never married, in obedience to a rule banning marriage for kings while they were out of the country.

Although Kigeli never married, on 9 January 2017, the Royal House announced that his nephew, Prince Emmanuel Bushayija (to reign as Yuhi VI of Rwanda), would succeed him as pretender to the Rwandan throne. He is the son of the half-brother of Kigeli, Prince William Bushayija.

After Kigeli's death, it was revealed he had at least one daughter, Jacqueline Rwivanga, married to Andrew Rugasira (1998-2015) and a mother of five.

== Ancestry ==
Ancestors of Kigeli V Ndahindurwa

8. Mutara II of Rwanda
4. Kigeli IV of Rwanda
9. Nyirakigeri
2. Yuhi V of Rwanda
10. Rwakagara
5. Nyirayuhi
1. Kigeli V of Rwanda
3. Mukashema Bernadette

== Honours ==
=== Status and recognition ===
As titular King in exile, as part of maintaining his royal family's cultural heritage, Kigeli V issued chivalric orders and titles of nobility with himself as fount of honour, in accordance with traditional customs.

Research in 2016 found that noble Rwandan titles were given to non-Rwandans by King Mutara III, the prior King of Rwanda. This was consistent with King Kigeli V's statements that his elder brother, when he reigned as King, granted orders and noble titles to non-Rwandans. An independent article confirming this was printed in an article titled "African King Gets Papal Honor from Vatican" in The Guardian, a publication of the Diocese of Little Rock, Arkansas, United States, 4 July 1947.

The titles are recognised by Burke's Peerage

=== Foreign titles ===
- Solomonic dynastyː Ras

=== Foreign orders ===
Foreign orders and decorations received by the King:

- Knight Grand Cross of the Order of Saints Maurice and Lazarus (House of Savoy)
- Knight Grand Cross of the Order of the Immaculate Conception of Vila Viçosa (House of Braganza)
- Knight Grand Cross of the Order of Saint Michael of the Wing (House of Braganza)
- Knight Grand Cross of the Order of the Queen of Sheba (Solomonic dynasty)
- Knight Grand Cross of the Order of the Star of Ethiopia (Ethiopian Empire)
- Knight (single rank order) of the Imperial Order of Solomon (Ethiopian Empire)
- Knight Grand Collar of the Royal Order of Ismail (Royal House of Egypt)
- Knight Grand Collar of the Order of the Eagle of Georgia (Royal House of Georgia)
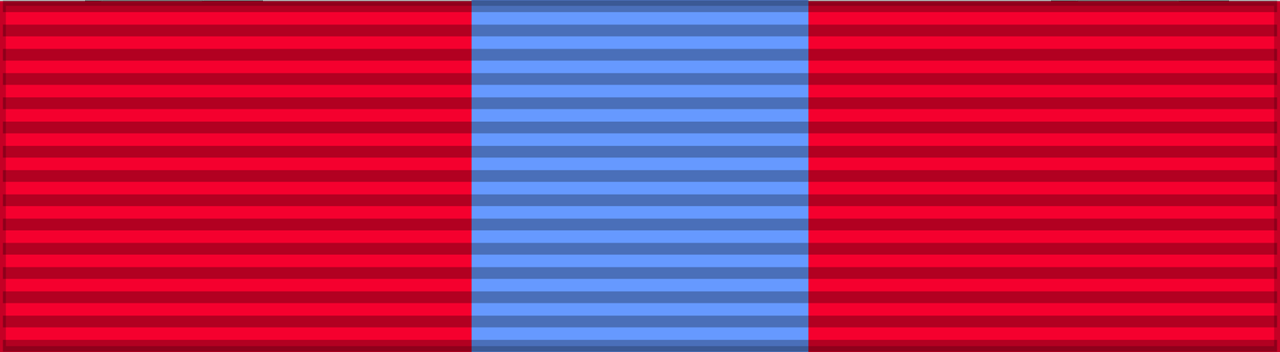
- Knight Grand Collar of the Order of Merit of the Portuguese Royal House (House of Braganza)
- Knight Grand Cordon of the Royal and Hashemite Order of the Pearl (Royal House of Sulu)

Kigeli V Ndahindurwa House of Ndahindurwa Born: 29 June 1936 Died: 16 October 2016
Regnal titles
Preceded by Mutara III	King of Rwanda; 25 July 1959 – 28 January 1961	Vacant Monarchy abolished
Titles in pretence
Loss of title Rwandan Revolution	— TITULAR — King of Rwanda; 28 January 1961 – 16 October 2016	Succeeded by Yuhi VI
