= National Assembly of Rwanda =

Legislature of Rwanda from 1961 to 1973

National Assembly of Rwanda (French: Assemblée nationale) was the unicameral legislature of Rwanda from 1961 to 1973. It was established in January 1961, and members were elected in general elections. It was dissolved following the 1973 coup d'état.

== Speakers ==
Name	Took office	Left office	Notes
Calliope Mulindahabi	1961	1961	
Amandin Rugira	1961	1963	
Anastase Makuza	1964	1965	
Balthazar Bicamumpaka	1965	1969	
Thaddée Bagaragaza	1969	1973	

== Elections ==
- 1961 Rwandan parliamentary election
- 1965 Rwandan general election
- 1969 Rwandan general election

== See also ==
- Politics of Rwanda
- History of Rwanda
