= Association for Social Promotion of the Masses =

The Association for Social Promotion of the Masses (French: Association pour la promotion sociale de la masse, APROSOMA) was a political party in Rwanda.

== History ==
The party was established on 15 February 1959 by Joseph Gitera Habyarimana alongside friends and former schoolmates. Although it initially promoted social improvement for both Hutu and Tutsi, it later became an anti-Tutsi party.

APROSOMA contested the pre-independence elections in 1961, receiving 3.6% of the vote and winning two seats. In 1965 the country became a one-party state under MDR-Parmehutu.

== Ideology ==
Its leader, Joseph Gitera Habyarimana, is the author of an earlier version of the "Hutu Ten Commandments".
