= 1965 Rwandan general election =

- 10 March 1965
- Presidential election
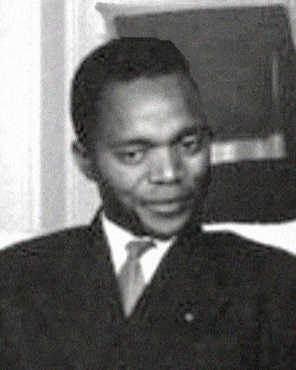
Nominee	Grégoire Kayibanda
Party	MDR-Parmehutu
Popular vote	1,236,654
Percentage	100%
President before election
Grégoire Kayibanda
MDR-Parmehutu
Elected President
Grégoire Kayibanda
MDR-Parmehutu

General elections were held in Rwanda on 10 March 1965, the first direct one in the country and the first since independence in 1962. At the time, the country was a one-party state with MDR-Parmehutu as the sole legal party. Its leader, Grégoire Kayibanda, ran unopposed in the country's first election for President. Voter turnout was 88%.

== Electoral system ==
The 47 members of the National Assembly elections were elected in ten multi-member constituencies. Voters could approve the entire MDR-Parmehutu list, or give a preferential vote to a single candidate.

== Results ==
=== President ===
Candidate	Party	Votes	%
Grégoire Kayibanda	MDR-Parmehutu	1,236,654	100.00
Total		1,236,654	100.00
Valid votes		1,236,654	98.03
Invalid/blank votes		24,804	1.97
Total votes		1,261,458	100.00
Registered voters/turnout		1,440,440	87.57
Source: Nohlen et al.

=== National Assembly ===
Party	Votes	%	Seats	+/–
MDR-Parmehutu	1,231,788	100.00	47	+12
Total	1,231,788	100.00	47	+3
Valid votes	1,231,788	97.76		
Invalid/blank votes	28,255	2.24		
Total votes	1,260,043	100.00		
Registered voters/turnout	1,440,440	87.48		
Source: Sternberger et al.
