= Guy Logiest =

Belgian military officer in Rwanda (1912–1991)

Guillaume "Guy" Logiest (1912–1991) was a Belgian military officer. He served in colonial Rwanda as Belgium's top-ranking colonial official, the special military resident from 1959–1962 and High Representative (1962). Under his guidance, the political framework was laid for democratic elections in 1962 and independence of the country on 1 July that year.

== Career ==
Guillaume Logiest was born in Ghent, Belgium to a French-speaking family. He was called Guy by his family and associates. He entered the military as a young man and made his career there.

He was assigned to colonial Rwanda as the highest-ranking military officer. Belgium had assigned military officers as its top colonial administrators in the colony. From 1959 to 1962, Logiest served as special military resident, and High Representative (1962) of Rwanda. In 1959 the Hutu majority overthrew the Tutsi monarchy in the Rwandan Revolution. It had controlled much of the country for centuries. Although in the minority, the Tutsi had been favored by the German and Belgian colonial administrations.

During the years when Rwanda was developing institutions to gain independence from colonial rule, Logiest helped guide the creation of a political framework for administration. This included preparation for elections, with the expected result that the Hutu majority would take power. Until Rwanda's full independence in 1962, Logiest continued to serve as Belgium's highest official representative in Rwanda. He worked closely together with the country's first leader, Grégoire Kayibanda, and encouraged him to pursue a pro-Western, anti-communist policy. Logiest has also been criticized for helping Kayibanda to shape a system that emphasized racial distinctions between Hutu and Tutsi rather than class antagonisms. Later Logiest also was head of the Belgian military mission to the Congo, where he actively countered popular supporters of deceased Patrice Lumumba.
