= 1961 Rwandan parliamentary election =

- 25 September 1961
- All 44 seats in the Legislative Assembly; 23 seats needed for a majority
- Turnout: 95.59%
Party	Leader	Vote %	Seats	+/–
Parmehutu	Grégoire Kayibanda	77.58	35	New
UNAR	François Rukeba	16.87	7	New
APROSOMA	Joseph Gitera Habyarimana	3.64	2	New
This lists parties that won seats. See the complete results below.
Results by constituency
Prime Minister before	Prime Minister after
Grégoire Kayibanda; Parmehutu	Grégoire Kayibanda; Parmehutu

Parliamentary elections were held in Rwanda on 25 September 1961 alongside a referendum on the country's monarchy. The result was a victory for Parmehutu, which won 35 of the 44 seats in the Legislative Assembly. Voter turnout was 96%.

They were the last multiparty elections held in Rwanda until 2003.

== Results ==
Party	Votes	%	Seats
Parmehutu	974,329	77.58	35
Rwandese National Union	211,929	16.87	7
Association for Social Promotion of the Masses	45,740	3.64	2
Rwandese Democratic Rally	4,172	0.33	0
Other parties	19,726	1.57	0
Total	1,255,896	100.00	44
Valid votes	1,255,896	98.26	
Invalid/blank votes	22,248	1.74	
Total votes	1,278,144	100.00	
Registered voters/turnout	1,337,096	95.59	
Source: Nohlen et al.
