= 1959 in Ruanda-Urundi =

- Decades: 1930s; 1940s; 1950s; 1960s
- See also: Other events of 1959

The following lists events that happened during 1959 in Ruanda-Urundi.

== Events ==
=== November ===
- November 1 – Violence between the Hutu and Tutsi people was triggered by an attack upon Hutu activist and future interim president Dominique Mbonyumutwa. Over the next two weeks 300 people, mostly Tutsi, were killed, in what was known as the wind of destruction.
