= 1973 Rwandan coup d'état =

Military coup by Juvénal Habyarimana

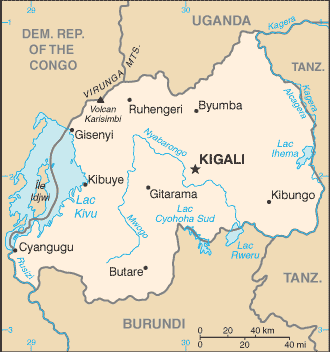
- A CIA WFB map of Rwanda
Date	5 July 1973
Location	Kigali, Rwanda
Result	Coup successful

Belligerents
Committee for Peace and National Union	Rwandan government

Commanders and leaders
Juvénal Habyarimana	Grégoire Kayibanda

Units involved
Rwandan Armed Forces	None

Casualties and losses
0	56 died after arrest

The 1973 Rwandan coup d'état, also known as the Coup d'état of 5 July (French: Coup d'état du 5 Juillet), was a military coup staged by Juvénal Habyarimana against incumbent president Grégoire Kayibanda in the Republic of Rwanda. The coup took place on 5 July 1973 and was considered by many as a betrayal.

== Background ==
While still under Belgian rule in the 1950s and early 1960s, resentment towards colonial rule and the ethnic Tutsi elite among the Hutu had increased, and led to the formation of the political party Parmehutu by Grégoire Kayibanda in 1957, with aims to overthrow the monarchy and gain identical rights ("emancipation") for the Hutus. This was achieved following the 1961 election and referendum, but the absence of effective Tutsi opposition led to regional tensions between Hutu politicians. The central and southern politicians were opposed by those from the north.

In the months prior to Habyarimana's coup, the Army (mainly composed of northern soldiers) had intensified persecution of ethnic Tutsi through the formation of Hutu vigilante committees to ensure enforcement of the required ethnic quotas requested by Habyarimana. Kayibanda refused this policy of quotas and was then described by the Army as a 'weak' leader. Fake rumors and documents were produced by the Army against the President and Rwanda became isolated economically and diplomatically, especially from neighbouring Uganda (then under the rule of Idi Amin) which housed large numbers of Tutsi. This situation was regarded by the majority of the population as a betrayal from Habyarimana. Indeed, prior to the coup Habyarimana, who served as Army Chief of Staff, was also a friend of president Kayibanda.

== The coup d'état ==
On the morning of 5 July 1973, Juvénal Habyarimana with AML-60 armored cars and infantry from the Rwandan National guard, took over the government and put then-president Grégoire Kayibanda under house arrest. The next morning after the coup Habyarimana announced the Committee for Peace and National Union. The coup was completely successful and resulted in no lives lost; however, 56 people were arrested. After the coup, all 56 people that were arrested, including former president Grégoire Kayibanda, starved to death while in prison.

== Aftermath ==
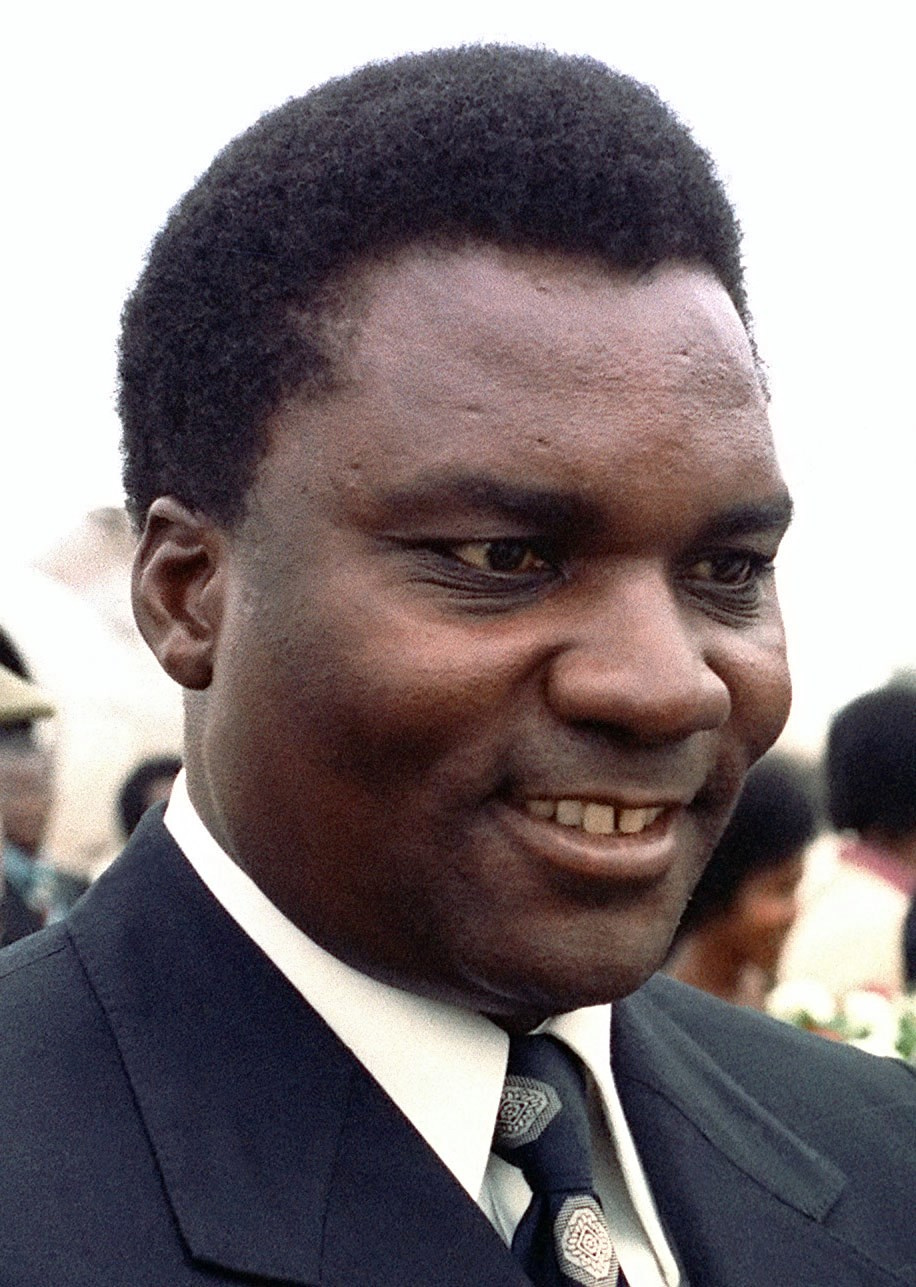
Juvénal Habyarimana, who took power in the coup, pictured in 1980

Immediately after seizing power, Habyarimana established a totalitarian dictatorship and outlawed all political parties, but in 1974 created his own, the National Revolutionary Movement for Development (Mouvement révolutionnaire national pour le développement, MRND), as the country's only legally-allowed party.

While the coup itself was bloodless, fifty-six people – mostly former leaders – were killed by the security services between 1974 and 1977, with Kayibanda dying in detention in 1976, probably of starvation. Others were killed through various means, including immolation, beating, and being tied to moving vehicles. These other deaths were not publicly revealed until a political fracture in the new regime emerged in the early 1980s. As a result, Habyarimana's government offered $2,000 to $20,000 USD in compensation to families who had lost a member.
