= Grégoire Kayibanda =

President of Rwanda from 1962 to 1973

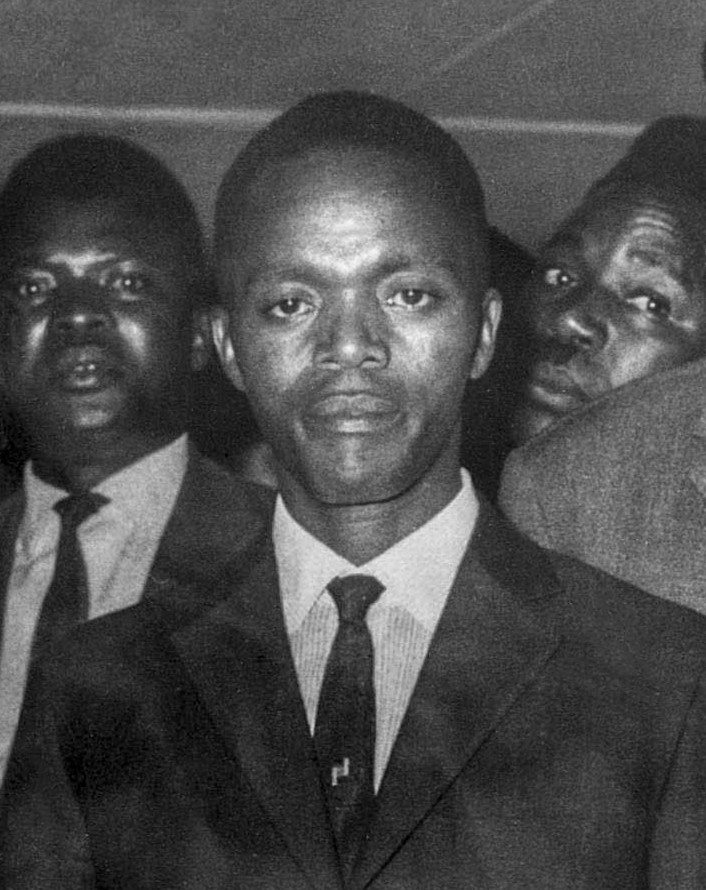
- Kayibanda in 1965

1st President of Rwanda
- In office 26 October 1961 – 5 July 1973
- Preceded by: Dominique Mbonyumutwa (Interim)
- Succeeded by: Juvénal Habyarimana

1st Prime Minister of Rwanda
- In office 19 October 1960 – 1 July 1962
- President: Dominique Mbonyumutwa (Interim)
- Preceded by: Office established
- Succeeded by: Sylvestre Nsanzimana (Note: 1991)

Personal details
- Born: 1 May 1924 Tare, Ruanda-Urundi
- Died: 15 December 1976 (aged 52) unknown (possibly Kabgayi)
- Cause of death: Reportedly starvation
- Party: Parmehutu (Parti du Mouvement de l'Emancipation Hutu)
- Spouse: Vérédiana Mukagatare (m. 1950)

Grégoire Kayibanda (1 May 1924 – 15 December 1976) was a Rwandan politician, revolutionary and military dictator who was the first President of Rwanda from 1962 to 1973. An ethnic Hutu, he was a pioneer of the Rwandan Revolution and led Rwanda's struggle for independence from Belgium, replacing the Tutsi monarchy with the First Rwandese Republic. Rwanda became independent from Belgium in 1962, with Kayibanda serving as the country's first president. He established a pro-Hutu and pro-Western policy and a de facto one-party system governed by his party, Parmehutu. He was overthrown in a coup d'état in 1973 by his defense minister, Juvénal Habyarimana, and died three years later.

== Early life and education ==
Kayibanda was born on 1 May 1924 in Tare, Rwanda. He studied his primary school at Tare then at Kabgayi. Kayibanda was admitted in Saint Léon Minor Seminary of Kabgayi in 1937. After the completion of minor seminary in 1943, he continued to Major Seminary of Nyakibanda where he studied for four years.

== Early political career ==
The Hutu majority had long been resentful of power held by the Tutsi minority. They were encouraged by Hutu advocates in the Catholic Church, and by Christian Belgians, who were increasingly influential in the Congo. The United Nations mandates, the Tutsi elite class, and the Belgian colonists contributed to the growing social and political unrest. Gregoire Kayibanda, an ethnic Hutu, led the Hutu "emancipation" movement. He founded the political party Parmehutu (Parti du Mouvement de l'Emancipation Hutu; Hutu Emancipation Movement Party), and wrote his "Bahutu Manifesto" in 1957.

In reaction, in 1959 Tutsis founded the UNAR party, made up of those who desired immediate independence for Ruanda-Urundi based on the existing Tutsi monarchy. This group also became quickly militarized. Skirmishes began between UNAR and PARMEHUTU groups. Kayibanda's successful campaign brought the majority Hutu to power for the first time in Rwanda.

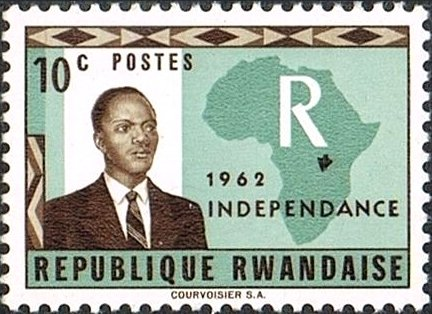
1962 stamp celebrating Kayibanda as leader of Rwanda's independence movement.

== First Rwandese Republic ==
In 1961 the Rwandan monarchy was dissolved and a brief transitional administration was led by Dominique Mbonyumutwa before the establishment of the First Rwandese Republic. Rwanda became independent at midnight on 1 July 1962. Kayibanda spoke at ceremonies later that day to commemorate the occasion, thanking the people who had contributed to the country's independence. He also thanked the work of the Belgians, Germans, and United Nations in developing the country. He said, "Though the Belgians made some mistakes here, the net result of their effort has been most positive," and appealed to them and other countries for technical aid. He led Rwanda's first delegation to the United Nations General Assembly on 18 September.

Kayibanda closely cooperated with Belgian colonial official Guy Logiest during this period. Together, they shaped a system that emphasized racial distinctions between Hutu and Tutsi rather than class antagonisms.

== President of Rwanda ==
Kayibanda was elected president on 26 October. Over the next three years, Kayibanda increased his power step by step. By 1965, Parmehutu was the only legal party in the country. At elections held that year, Kayibanda appeared alone on the ballot for president. He was reelected in 1969, again as the only candidate. In both elections, a single list of Parmehutu candidates was returned to the legislature. The 1962 constitution of Rwanda, enacted by Kayibanda's regime, proscribed communist activities and propaganda as Belgian settlers conditioned the gain of independence to the rejection of Communism, in the era of the iron curtain. The UNAR party threatened to turn their back on the Belgians and adhere to communism.

Kayibanda pursued a pro-Western, anticommunist foreign policy. Rwanda enjoyed cordial relations with the Republic of China, while strongly criticizing the People's Republic of China's policies in Africa. Kayibanda's government adopted a generally neutral stance on the Arab–Israeli conflict and the Vietnam War. Socio-economically, he drew inspiration from Christian socialism and pursued a moderate policy of Africanization and state regulations on private industry. Kayibanda tried to enlist the help of Dominican priest and economist Louis-Joseph Lebret to work on economic development plans, but the latter's direct contribution to these plans remained limited due to illness.

In the presidential elections of 1973 a project promulgated on 18 May was presented, the duration of the presidential term of Kabiyanda was extended from 4 to 5 years, and the age limit of 60 years was eliminated. With North-South regionalist rivalries, President Kayibanda's regime was accused of having progressively dismissed the political leaders of the north and of concentrating power in the hands of the nationals of his native prefecture, Gitarama.

== Overthrow and death ==
On 5 July 1973 defense minister Major General Juvénal Habyarimana overthrew Kayibanda in a military coup, beginning the second Rwandese republic. Although described as bloodless, as a result of the coup, an estimated 55 people, mostly officials, lawyers or businessmen close to the previous regime, were reportedly executed. The families of these people were given sums of money to pay for their silence. The new government held Kayibanda and his wife, Vérédiana Kayibanda, in a secret location (rumored to be a house near Kabgayi), where they were reportedly "starved to death".

== Sources ==
- Nyrop, Richard F.; et al. (1969). Area Handbook for Rwanda. U.S. Government Printing Office.

Political offices
Preceded by Dominique Mbonyumutwa	President of Rwanda; 26 October 1961 – 5 July 1973	Succeeded by Juvénal Habyarimana
