= Parmehutu =

Rwandan ruling party from 1962 to 1973

Hutu Emancipation Movement Party Parti du Mouvement de l'Emancipation Hutu
- Abbreviation: Parmehutu
- Founder: Grégoire Kayibanda
- Founded: June 1957
- Dissolved: July 1973
- Succeeded by: National Revolutionary Movement for Development (1975)
- Headquarters: Kigali, Rwanda
- Ideology: Anti-monarchism; Anti-communism; Hutu Power
- Political position: Far-right

The Hutu Emancipation Movement Party (French: Parti du Mouvement de l'Emancipation Hutu, Parmehutu), also known as the Republican Democratic Movement – Parmehutu (Mouvement démocratique républicain – Parmehutu, MDR-Parmehutu), was a political party in Rwanda. The movement emphasised the right of the majority ethnicity to rule and asserted the supremacy of Hutus over Tutsis. It was the most important party of the "Hutu Revolution" of 1959–61 that led to Rwanda becoming an independent republic and Hutus superseding Tutsis as the ruling group.

== History ==
The party was founded by Grégoire Kayibanda in June 1957 as the Hutu Social Movement, a party of Hutu nationalists who fought on behalf of the Hutu majority, which it considered oppressed. It was renamed on 25 September 1959, and dominated the local elections in 1960, winning 2,390 of 3,125 elected communal council seats and 160 of 229 burgomasters.

In 1961, parliamentary elections were held alongside a referendum on the Tutsi monarchy of Mwami Kigeri V. MDR-Parmehutu won 35 of the 44 seats in the Legislative Assembly, whilst the referendum saw the end of the monarchy. Kayibanda appointed a government of Hutus, and became president after independence in July 1962. By 1965, it was the only legal party in the country, and the 1965 elections saw Kayibanda run unopposed for the presidency and the party win all 47 National Assembly seats.

Under the Parmehutu rule, Tutsis were severely discriminated against, persecuted, and repeatedly massacred, leading to hundreds of thousands of Tutsi fleeing the country. The 1963 Tutsi massacres were described by Bertrand Russell as "the worst since the Holocaust"; in 1967 another 20,000 Tutsi were killed.

In the July 1973 coup, Kayibanda was ousted by his cousin Major-General Juvénal Habyarimana who, like other leaders from Rwanda's north (abakonde) felt marginalised by the Southern-dominated Parmehutu regime. The Parmehutu party was suspended and was officially banned two years later when Rwanda became a one-party state under Habyarimana's new National Revolutionary Movement for Development (MRND), which was dominated by Hutu from the northern and northwestern parts of the country.

== Electoral history ==
=== Presidential Elections ===
Election	Party candidate	Votes	%	Result
1965	Grégoire Kayibanda	1,236,654	100%	Elected ✓
1969	Grégoire Kayibanda	1,426,159	100%	Elected ✓

=== Chamber of Deputies elections ===
Election	Party leader	Votes	%	Seats	+/–	Position	Result
1961	Grégoire Kayibanda	974,329	77.6%	35 / 44	▲35	▲1st	Supermajority government
1965	Grégoire Kayibanda	1,231,788	100%	47 / 47	▲12	1st	Sole legal party
1969	Grégoire Kayibanda	1,426,701	100%	47 / 47	Steady	1st	Sole legal party

== See also ==
- National Revolutionary Movement for Development (MRND)
