= 1961 Rwandan monarchy referendum =

- 25 September 1961

Do you want to keep the institution of the Mwami (monarchy) in Rwanda?
For	20.15%
Against	79.85%

If so, do you want Kigeli V to remain Mwami (King) of Rwanda?
For	20.40%
Against	79.60%

A referendum on the monarchy was held in Rwanda on 25 September 1961, concurrent with parliamentary elections. The referendum asked two questions: whether the monarchy should be retained after independence the following year, and whether the incumbent, Kigeli V, should remain King.

The result was a "no" to both questions from 80% of voters, with a 95% turnout. King Kigeli claimed the vote had been rigged.

== Results ==
=== Question one ===
Should the Monarchy in Rwanda be preserved?

Choice	Votes	%
For	253,963	20.15
Against	1,006,339	79.85
Invalid/blank votes	14,329	–
Total	1,274,631	100
Registered voters/turnout	1,337,342	95.31
Source: African Elections Database

=== Question two ===
Should Kigeli V remain King of Rwanda?

Choice	Votes	%
For	257,510	20.40
Against	1,004,655	79.60
Invalid/blank votes	11,526	–
Total	1,273,691	100
Registered voters/turnout	1,337,342	95.24
Source: African Elections Database
