= Second Rwandese Republic =

Government of Rwanda (1973-1994)

Rwandese Republic République Rwandaise (French)
- 1973–1994
- Flag Coat of arms
- Motto: Liberté, Coopération, Progrès (Liberty, Cooperation, Progress)
- Anthem: "Rwanda Rwacu" (English: "Our Rwanda")
- Capital: Kigali
- Demonym: Rwandan
- Government: One-party presidential republic under a totalitarian military dictatorship
- President
  - 1973–1994: Juvénal Habyarimana
- Legislature: National Development Council (1982-1994)
- History
  - Established: 5 July 1973
  - Rwandan Civil War: 1990–1994
  - Disestablished: 6 April 1994

Area
  - Total: 26,338 km^{2} (10,169 sq mi)
- Currency: Rwandan franc
- ISO 3166 code: RW
Preceded by	Succeeded by
First Rwandese Republic	Third Rwandese Republic
- Today part of: Rwanda

The second Rwandese Republic period began on July 5, 1973, when Defence Minister Maj. Gen. Juvénal Habyarimana overthrew President Grégoire Kayibanda. Habyarimana suspended the constitution, dissolved the National Assembly of Rwanda and imposed a strict ban on all political activity, ruling Rwanda as a totalitarian state.

Initially, Habyarimana abolished the quota system, winning him favour among Tutsi. However, this didn't last. In 1974, a public outcry developed over Tutsi over-representation in professional fields such as medicine and education. Thousands of Tutsi were forced to resign from such positions, and many were forced into exile. In associated violence, several hundred Tutsi were killed. Gradually, Habyarimana reimposed many of his predecessor's policies favouring Hutu over Tutsi.

In 1975, President Habyarimana formed the National Revolutionary Movement for Development (MRND) whose goals were to promote peace, unity, and national development. The movement was organized from the "hillside" to the national level and included elected and appointed officials.

Under MRND aegis, a new constitution making the country a totalitarian one-party state under the MRND was approved in a referendum in December 1978. These were shortly followed by presidential elections a few weeks later. Habyarimana, as president of the MRND, was the only candidate on the ballot. He was re-elected in 1983 and again in 1988, each time as sole candidate. However, in a minor concession to democracy, voters were given a choice of two MRND candidates in elections to the National Development Council of Rwanda. Responding to public pressure for political reform, President Habyarimana announced in July 1990 his intention to transform Rwanda's one-party state into a multi-party democracy.

== History ==
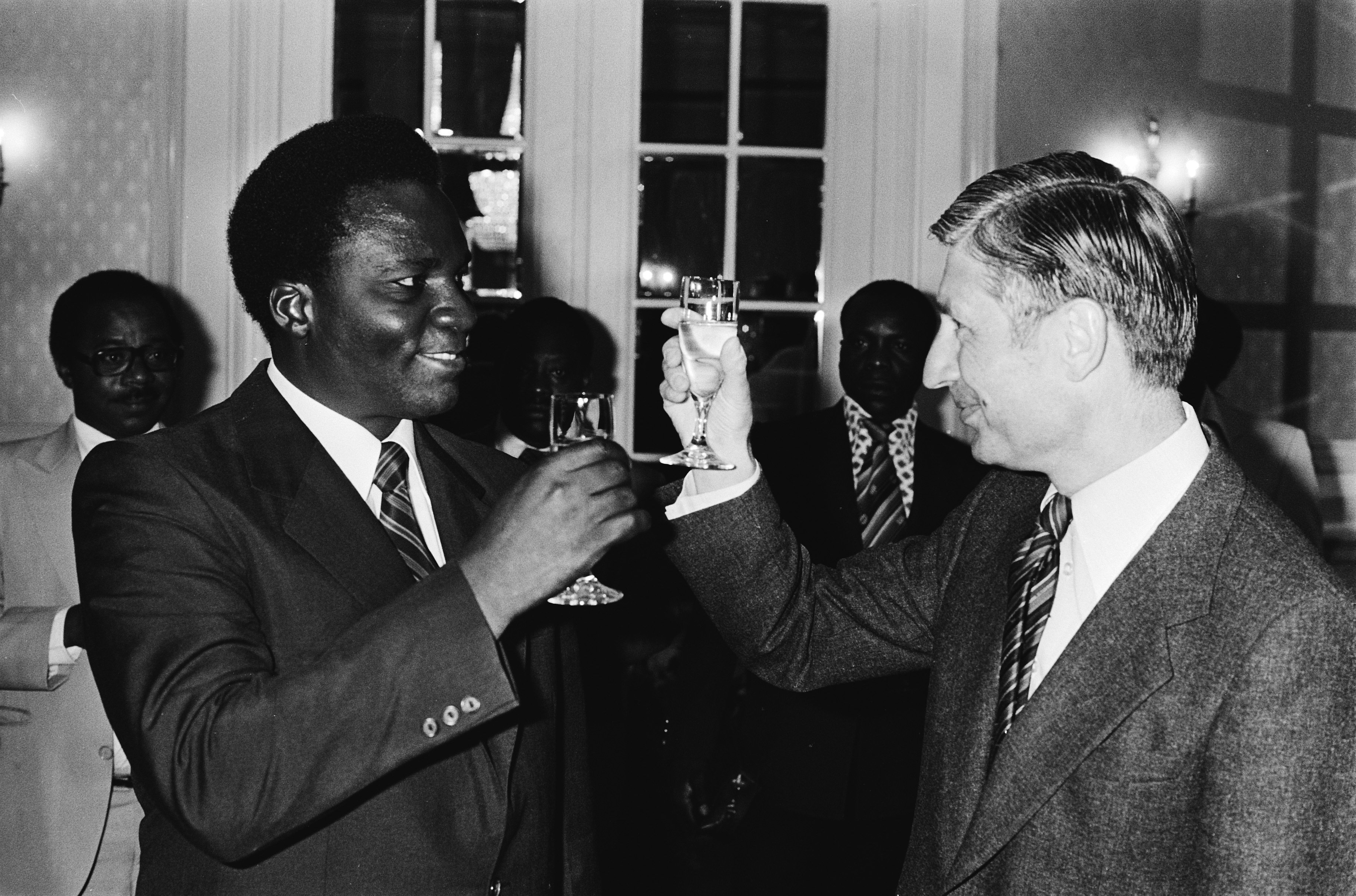
President Habyarimana with Dutch Prime Minister Dries van Agt in the Hague, 1980

On 5 July 1973, while serving as Army Chief of Staff and minister of defense, Habyarimana seized power in a coup d'état against the incumbent president Grégoire Kayibanda, ousting Kayibanda's ruling Parmehutu party. In 1975, he created the Mouvement Révolutionnaire National pour le Développement as the country's only legal party. The government stayed almost entirely in military hands until 1978 when a new constitution was approved in a referendum. At the same time, Habyarimana was elected to a five-year term as president; as president of the MRND, he was the only candidate. He was reelected in 1983 and 1988, both times as the only candidate.

A Hutu himself, he initially won favor among both Hutu and Tutsi groups given his administration's reluctance to implement policies that catered to his primarily Hutu supporters. This restraint did not last and Habyarimana eventually began to oversee a government that mirrored the policies of Kayibanda. Quotas were once again applied to jobs for universities and government services which intentionally disadvantaged Tutsis. As Habyarimana continued to favor a smaller and smaller coterie of supporters, Hutu groups who felt slighted by him cooperated with Tutsis to weaken his leadership. By the start of the invasion from Uganda by the army of the Rwanda Patriotic Front, a rebel army made up mostly of refugee Tutsi who had helped Uganda's Museveni seize control of the presidency, Habyarimana's supporters had shrunk down to the akazu ("little house" or "President's household"), which was mainly composed of an informal group of Hutu extremists from his home region, namely from the northwestern provinces of Gisenyi and Ruhengeri.

From 1975 to 1990, the MRND and the Habyarimana government were one. Under a constitution adopted in 1978, every five years the president of the MRND, Hayarimana, was automatically elected to a five-year term as president of the republic, and was confirmed in office via a referendum. Every four years, voters had the option of choosing between two MRND candidates for the legislature. All citizens of Rwanda became members of the MRND at birth.

Local administrations simultaneously represented the official party as well as the local authority. Legal and party policies were communicated and enforced from the Head of State down through the local administrative units, especially the general policy of Umuganda, in which Rwandans were required to "allocate half a day's labour per week" to infrastructural projects. Habyarimana is sometimes described as a moderate though the party is said to have used right-wing propaganda methods, advanced a conservative political agenda and was anti-communist. Human rights were severely curtailed, and citizens were often required to perform mandatory celebrations of his rule.

However, in 1990, before the Rwandan Patriotic Front (RPF) invasion, and because of mounting pressure from several sources—Rwanda's main ally and financial backer, France, its main funders, the IMF and the World Bank, and from its own citizens wishing for a greater voice and economic change—he agreed to allow the formation of other parties such as the Republican Democratic Movement, the Social Democratic Party, the Liberal Party and the Christian Democratic Party.

== Economic policy ==
Under Habyarimana's leadership, the country adopted a planned economy called the "liberal planning" based on planned liberalism, and adopted similar economic strategies in 1980 and 1986. In 1988, state-owned enterprises were privatized as part of the liberal planning policy.

Under Habyarimana's government, Rwanda focused on foreign aid and the Rwandan coffee industry, Habyarimana's leadership achieved great accomplishments and economic growth, including the proliferation of health centers at the municipal level, the creation of secondary schools throughout the country, the approval of private schools to supplement the government network from the mid-1980s, integrated rural development projects in different parts of the country, a network of tea projects with modern factories, the improvement of rural housing, water supply, rural electrification and telephone network, the modernization of the national asphalt road network, the construction of inter-municipal roads, the strengthening of the private banking network, and the reforestation of land unsuitable for agriculture. However, problems continued to exist, including an economic crisis caused by a collapse in coffee prices that began in the late 1980s.

== Rwanda Civil War ==
In October 1990, an attack on Habyarimana's government began when rebels from the RPF, a force of mostly Tutsi Rwandan refugees and expatriates who had served in the Ugandan army (many in key positions), crossed the border from Uganda. Habyarimana was in New York City attending the United Nations World Summit for Children when the attack commenced. When news of the RPF offensive broke, Habyarimana requested assistance from France in fighting the invasion. The French government responded by dispatching troops to his aid under the cover of protecting French nationals. Zairian President Mobutu Sese Seko's contribution was to send several hundred troops of the elite Special Presidential Division (DSP). The Zairian soldiers raped Rwandan civilians in the north of the country and looted their homes, prompting Habyarimana to expel them within a week of their arrival.

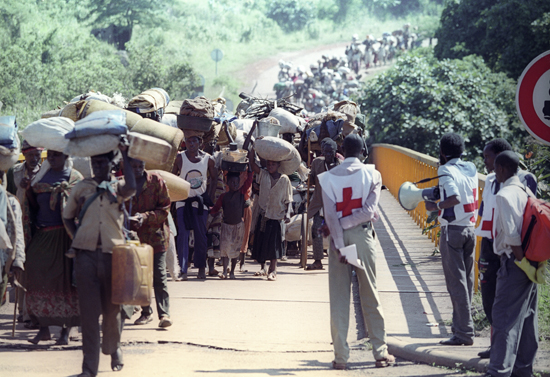
Red Cross volunteers monitoring and assisting displaced populations during the Rwandan Civil War, 1994.

With French assistance, and benefiting from the loss of RPF morale after Fred Rwigyema's death, the Rwandan Army enjoyed a major tactical advantage. By the end of October, they had regained all the ground taken by the RPF and pushed the rebels all the way back to the Ugandan border. Habyarimana accused the Ugandan Government of supplying the RPF, establishing a "rear command" for the group in Kampala, and "flagging off" the invasion. The Rwandan Government announced on 30 October that the war was over.

On 4 August 1993 the Rwandan government and the Rwandan Patriotic Front (RPF) signed the Arusha Accords to end the Rwandan Civil War. As stipulated by the agreement, the new transitional government was to be sworn in on 5 January 1994. Habyarimana was sworn in as interim President at the Parliament building, but then suddenly departed before calling up the new Prime Minister and cabinet to be inaugurated. Habyarimana returned that afternoon with a list of new cabinet members from Hutu extremist parties, who had not been agreed upon in the Arusha Accords, to be sworn in. Having not been formally invited for a second ceremony, Chief Justice Joseph Kavaruganda did not appear and the suggested ministers were not sworn in, infuriating Habyarimana.

== Inter-relationship with events in Burundi ==
The situation in Rwanda had been influenced in great detail by the situation in Burundi. Both countries had a Hutu majority, yet an army-controlled Tutsi government in Burundi persisted for decades. After the assassination of Rwagasore, his UPRONA party was split into Tutsi and Hutu factions. A Tutsi Prime Minister was chosen by the monarch, but, a year later in 1963, the monarch was forced to appoint a Hutu prime minister, Pierre Ngendandumwe, in an effort to satisfy growing Hutu unrest. Nevertheless, the monarch soon replaced him with another Tutsi prince. In Burundi's first elections following independence, in 1965, Ngendandumwe was elected Prime Minister. He was immediately assassinated by a Tutsi extremist and he was succeeded by another Hutu, Joseph Bamina. Hutus won 23 of the 33 seats in national elections a few months later, but the monarch nullified the elections. Bamina was soon also assassinated and the Tutsi monarch installed his own personal secretary, Leopold Biha, as the prime minister in his place. This led to a Hutu coup from which the Mwami fled the country and Biha was shot (but not killed). The Tutsi-dominated army, led by Michel Micombero brutally responded: almost all Hutu politicians were killed. Micombero assumed control of the government and a few months later deposed the new Tutsi monarch (the son of the previous monarch) and abolished the role of the monarchy altogether. He then threatened to invade Rwanda. A military dictatorship persisted in Burundi for another 27 years, until the next free elections, in 1993.

Another seven years of sporadic violence in Burundi (from 1965–1972) existed between the Hutus and Tutsis. In 1969 another purge of Hutus by the Tutsi military occurred. Then, a localized Hutu uprising in 1972 was fiercely answered by the Tutsi-dominated Burundi army in the largest Burundi genocide of Hutus, with a death toll nearing 200,000.

This wave of violence led to another wave of cross border refugees into Rwanda of Hutus from Burundi. Now there were large numbers of both Tutsi and Hutu refugees throughout the region, and tensions continued to mount.

In 1988, Hutu violence against Tutsis throughout northern Burundi again resurfaced, and in response the Tutsi army massacred approximately 20,000 more Hutu. Again, thousands of Hutus were forced into exile into Tanzania and Congo to flee another genocide of Hutu.

== See also ==
- History of Africa
- History of Burundi
- List of kings of Rwanda
- List of rulers of Rwanda
- List of presidents of Rwanda
- Politics of Rwanda
- Prime Minister of Rwanda
- Ruanda-Urundi
- Rwanda
- Kigali history and timeline

== Sources ==
- Kinzer, Stephen (2008). A Thousand Hills: Rwanda's Rebirth and the Man Who Dreamed it (Hardcover ed.). Hoboken, N.J.: John Wiley & Sons. ISBN 978-0-470-12015-6.
- Muhanguzi Kampe, Justus (2016). Eyes of a Journalist. Kampala: World of Inspiration. ISBN 9789970050185.
- Prunier, Gérard (1999). The Rwanda Crisis: History of a Genocide (2nd ed.). Kampala: Fountain Publishers Limited. ISBN 978-9970-02-089-8.
- Wallis, Andrew (2006). Silent Accomplice: The Untold Story of France's Role in the Rwandan Genocide. London: I.B.Tauris. ISBN 978-1-84511-247-9.
