= List of rulers of Rwanda =

Mwami of Rwanda
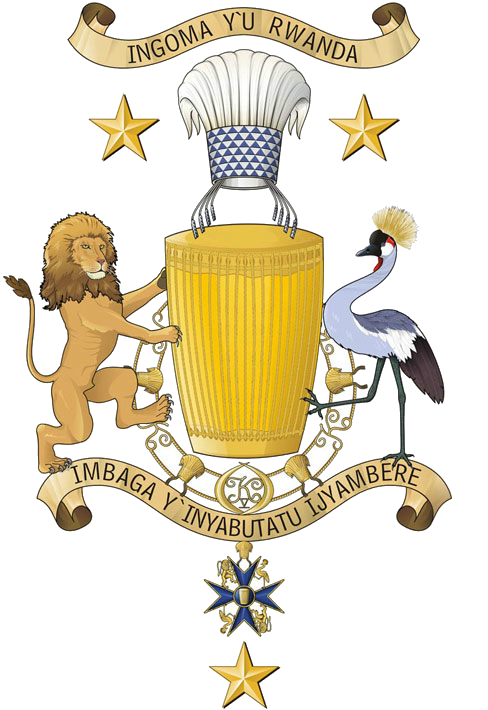
- Coat of arms of the Kingdom of Rwanda

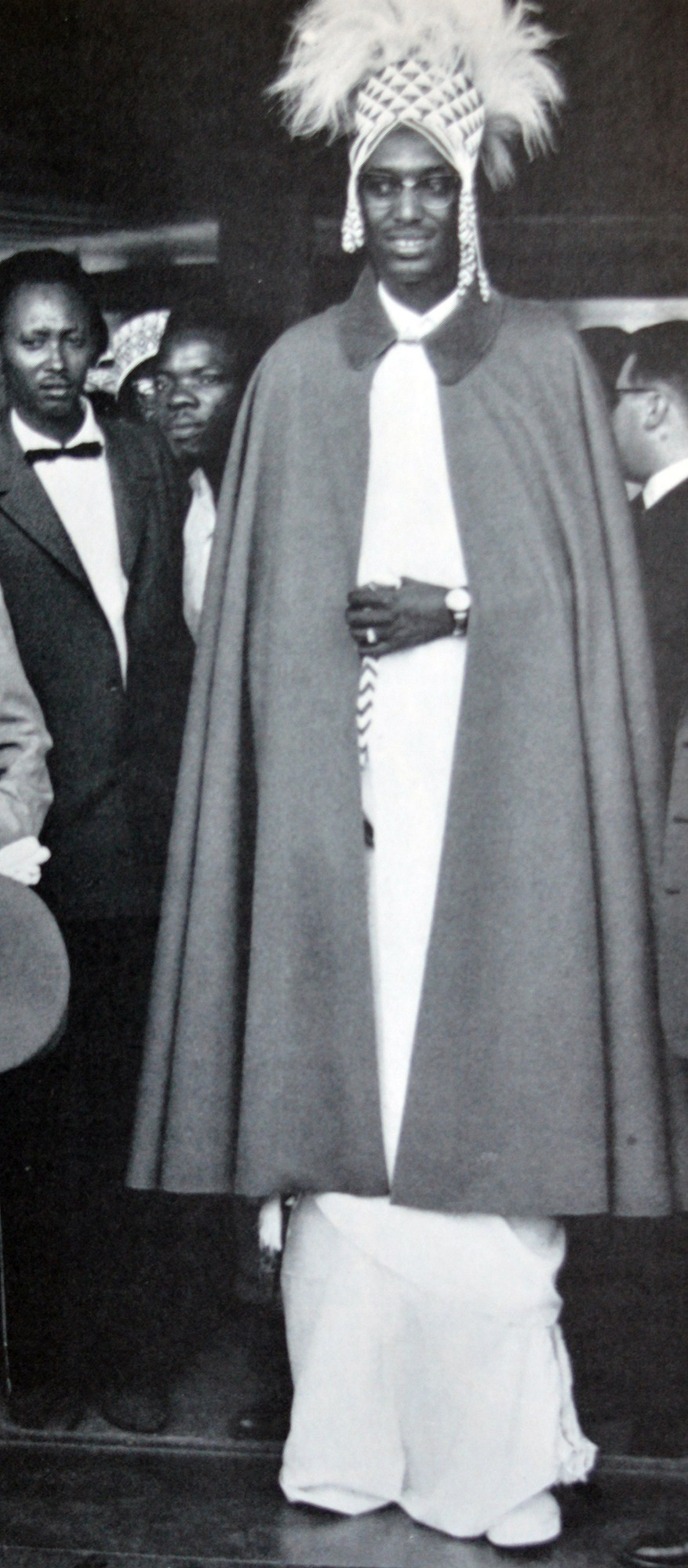
- Last to reign: Kigeli V Ndahindurwa; 28 July 1959 – 28 January 1961

Details
- Style: His Majesty
- First monarch: Gihanga I
- Last monarch: Kigeli V Ndahindurwa
- Formation: Unknown (ancient times)
- Abolition: 28 January 1961
- Residence: Nyanza, Rwanda
- Appointer: Royal Council of Abiru
- Pretender: Prince Emmanuel Bushayija

This article contains a list of rulers of Rwanda. The Kingdom of Rwanda was ruled by sovereigns titled mwami (plural abami), and was one of the oldest and the most centralized kingdoms in the history of Central and East Africa. The First Rwandese Republic abolished the monarchy in 1961 during the Rwandan Revolution, and was followed by the Second Rwandese republic in 1973 and the Third Rwandese Republic in 1994, before the current republic of Rwanda.

== Kings of Rwanda ==
=== Before 14th century ===
- Gihanga I
- Kanyarwanda I Gahima I
- Rukuge
- Rumeza I
- Yuhi I Musindi
- Rumeza II
- Nyarume
- Rubanda (Lugalbanda)
- Ndahiro I Bamara (Wamala)

=== 14th–20th centuries ===
14th–19th centuries
Portrait	Name (Lifespan)	Reign		Notes
Portrait	Name (Lifespan)	Vansina (2004)	Stewart (2006)	Notes
	Ndahiro II Ruyange	–	c. 1350–1386	
	Ndahiro III Ndoba	–	c. 1386–1410	
	Ndahiro IV Samembe	–	c. 1410–1434	
	Nsoro I Samukondo	–	Omitted	
	Nsoro II Byinshi	–	c. 1434–1458	
	Ruganzu I Bwimba	–	c. 1458–1482	
	Cyilima I Rugwe	–	c. 1482–1506	
	Kigeli I Mukobanya	–	c. 1506–1528	
	Mibambwe I Sekarongoro I Mutabazi	–	c. 1528–1552	
	Yuhi II Gahima II	–	c. 1552–1576	Enumerated as Yuhi I by Stewart.
	Ndahiro II Cyamatare	–	c. 1576–1600	
	Ruganzu II Ndoli	–	c. 1600–1624	
	Mutara I Nsoro III Semugeshi	–	c. 1624–1648	
	Kigeli II Nyamuheshera	–	c. 1648–1672	
	Mibambwe II Sekarongoro II Gisanura	c. 1700–1735	c. 1672–1696	
	Yuhi III Mazimpaka	1735–1766	c. 1696–1720	Enumerated as Yuhi II by Stewart.
	Kalemera Rwaka Ntagara	1766–1770	c. 1720–1744	
	Cyilima II Rujugira	1770–1786	c. 1744–1768	
	Kigeli III Ndabarasa	1786–1796	c. 1768–1792	
	Mibambwe III Mutabazi II Sentabyo	1796–1801	c. 1792–1797	
	Yuhi IV Gahindiro	1801–1845	c. 1797–1830	Enumerated as Yuhi III by Stewart.
	Mutara II Rwogera (1802–1867)	1845–1867	c. 1830–1853	
	Kigeli IV Rwabugiri (1840?–1895)	1867 – September 1895	c. 1853–1895	
	Mibambwe IV Rutarindwa	September 1895 – December 1896	c. 1895 – November 1896	
20th century
Portrait	Name (Lifespan)	Reign		Notes
	Yuhi V Musinga (1883–1944)	December 1896 – 12 November 1931		
	Mutara III Rudahigwa (1911–1959)	12 November 1931 – 25 July 1959		
	Kigeli V Ndahindurwa (1936–2016)	28 July 1959 – 28 January 1961		

== List of Presidents of Rwanda ==
Political parties

Party of the Hutu Emancipation Movement (Parmehutu)
National Republican Movement for Democracy and Development (MRND)
Rwandan Patriotic Front (RPF)

Status

‡ Denotes acting president

List of presidents of Rwanda
No.	Portrait	Name (Birth–Death)	Elected	Term of office			Ethnic group	Political party	Prime minister(s)	Ref.
No.	Portrait	Name (Birth–Death)	Elected	Took office	Left office	Time in office	Ethnic group	Political party	Prime minister(s)	Ref.
Republic of Rwanda (part of Ruanda-Urundi)
—		Dominique Mbonyumutwa‡ (1921–1986)	—	28 January 1961	26 October 1961	271 days	Hutu	Parmehutu	Kayibanda	
1	Grégoire Kayibanda	Grégoire Kayibanda (1924–1976)	1961	26 October 1961	1 July 1962	248 days	Hutu	Parmehutu	Himself	
Republic of Rwanda (independent country)
(1)	Grégoire Kayibanda	Grégoire Kayibanda (1924–1976)	1965; 1969	1 July 1962	5 July 1973 (Deposed in coup)	11 years, 4 days	Hutu	Parmehutu	Position abolished	
2	Juvénal Habyarimana	Juvénal Habyarimana (1937–1994) (Note: Styled as Chairman of the Committee for Peace and National Unity until 1 August 1973.)	1978; 1983; 1988	5 July 1973	6 April 1994 (Assassinated)	20 years, 275 days	Hutu	MRND / Military	Position abolished (until 1991) Nsanzimana; Nsengiyaremye; Uwilingiyimana	
Vacant (6 April 1994 – 8 April 1994)
—		Théodore Sindikubwabo‡ (1928–1998) (Note: After the assassination of Habyarimana, Colonel Théoneste Bagosora along with Colonel Rwagafilita gathered supporters and convened a meeting of a Crisis Committee; Sindikubwabo was installed as interim President at the meeting. The committee was officially dissolved, but Bagosora and other senior officers remained de facto leaders of the country during Sindikubwabo's term.)	—	8 April 1994	19 July 1994 (Ousted) (Note: Fled to Zaire at the end of the Rwandan Civil War and the Rwandan genocide.)	102 days	Hutu	MRND	Kambanda	
3	Pasteur Bizimungu	Pasteur Bizimungu (born 1950)	—	19 July 1994	23 March 2000 (Resigned)	5 years, 248 days	Hutu	RPF	Twagiramungu; Rwigema; Makuza	
4	Paul Kagame	Paul Kagame (born 1957)	—	24 March 2000‡	22 April 2000	26 years, 130 days	Tutsi	RPF	Makuza; Habumuremyi; Murekezi; Ngirente; Nsengiyumva	
4	Paul Kagame	Paul Kagame (born 1957)	2003; 2010; 2017; 2024	22 April 2000	Incumbent	26 years, 130 days	Tutsi	RPF	Makuza; Habumuremyi; Murekezi; Ngirente; Nsengiyumva	

== See also ==
- List of kings of Rwanda
- List of presidents of Rwanda
- History of Rwanda
- Kingdom of Rwanda
- Ruanda-Urundi
  - List of colonial residents of Rwanda
- List of presidents of Rwanda
- Vice President of Rwanda
- Prime Minister of Rwanda
