= Joseph Nzirorera =

Rwandan politician and genocide perpetrator (1950–2010)

Joseph Nzirorera (1950 - 1 July 2010) was a Rwandan politician and accused génocidaires who was arrested by the International Criminal Tribunal for Rwanda (ICTR) for his role in the Rwandan genocide.

== Background ==
Nzirorera was born in 1950 in Busogo, Ruhengeri Prefecture. He received a degree in civil engineering from the University of Butare in 1975.

== Career ==
Nzirorema served as national secretary of the National Revolutionary Movement for Development (MRND) and as speaker of the Rwandan Parliament. He also served as Minister of Industry, Mines and Handicraft.

== Arrest and legal proceedings ==
Nzirorera was arrested by the International Criminal Tribunal for Rwanda in July 1998. In a joint trial with Édouard Karemera and Mathieu Ngirumpatse, Nzirorera was accused of conspiracy to commit genocide, direct and public incitement to commit genocide, genocide, complicity in genocide, as well as crimes against humanity.

In 2003, he was described by expert witness Nkiko Nsengimana as the "leader of the Interahamwe". In 2004, he was accused of having asked the Interahamwe to kill a Tutsi child in Busogo, Ruhengeri Prefecture in April 1994.

== Death ==
On 1 July 2010, Nzirorera died at the age of 59 while awaiting trial.
