= Édouard Karemera =

Rwandan politician (1951–2020)

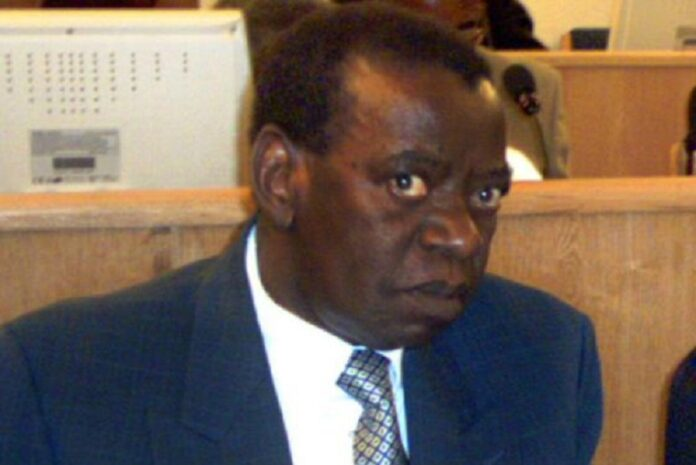
- Edouard Karemera, first Vice President of the MRND party
- Born: 1 September 1951; Kibuye, Rwanda-Urundi
- Died: 31 August 2020 (aged 68); Sebikotane prison, Dakar, Senegal
- Political party: Republican Democratic Movement, MRND
- Conviction: Genocide
- Penalty: Life imprisonment (21 December 2011)

Details
- Date apprehended: 5 June 1998
- Imprisoned at: Senegal

Édouard Karemera (1 September 1951 – 31 August 2020) was a Rwandan politician who was convicted of genocide in 2011 after being apprehended in 1998.

Born in Mwendo commune, Kibuye préfecture, Rwanda, Karemera held the position of Minister of Institutional Relations in the government of Juvénal Habyarimana of May 1987.

After Habyarimana's assassination, he became Minister of the Interior in the interim government of Jean Kambanda until mid-July 1994. In 1994, he was also First Vice President of the MRND party. During the genocide against the Tutsi, he supported the Interahamwe, a youth militia that was responsible for killing and raping Tutsi women. He also travelled across the country and espoused their anti-Tutsi views to incite more killings.

Karemera fled Rwanda after the genocide. On 5 June 1998, he was arrested at his home in Lomé, Togo. His initial trial before the International Criminal Tribunal for Rwanda was suspended after the judge Andresia Vaz resigned because she had lived with a prosecutor. His new trial began on 19 September 2005. He was accused along with the rest of the prisoners and tried together with Matthieu Ngirumpatse, the President of the MRND, and sentenced to life imprisonment on 21 December 2011, at the age of 62, for his role in the genocide. He appealed the verdict, although the sentence of life imprisonment was confirmed on 29 September 2014. Karemera died on 31 August 2020 in Sebikotane prison outside Dakar, Senegal.

== See also ==
- Augustin Bizimana
