= National Development Council =

National Development Council may be:

- National Development Council (India)
- National Development Council (Poland)
- National Development Council (Rwanda)
- National Development Council (Taiwan)
