= 1983 Rwandan parliamentary election =

Parliamentary elections were held in Rwanda on 26 December 1983. Although the previous elections had only been held two years beforehand, the term of that parliament was deemed to have begun in January 1979, so its five-year mandate was due to end. At the time the country was still a one-party state, with the National Revolutionary Movement for Development as the sole legal party. The National Development Council was enlarged from 64 to 70 seats; for each of the 10 constituencies, there were the equivalent of two candidates for each seat. Seventeen MPs lost their seats to challengers.

== Results ==
Party	Votes	%	Seats	+/–
National Revolutionary Movement for Development	2,364,592	100.00	70	+6
Total	2,364,592	100.00	70	+6
Registered voters/turnout	2,433,265	–		
Source: African Elections Database
