= 1988 Rwandan parliamentary election =

Parliamentary elections were held in Rwanda on 26 December 1988. At the time the country was still a one-party state, with the National Revolutionary Movement for Development as the sole legal party. The National Development Council was composed of 70 seats, with 139 candidates contesting the election. Twenty-six MPs lost their seats to challengers, whilst voter turnout was 98.5%.

== Results ==
Party	Votes	%	Seats	+/–
National Revolutionary Movement for Development	2,701,682	100.00	70	0
Total	2,701,682	100.00	70	0
Valid votes	2,701,682	99.99		
Invalid/blank votes	243	0.01		
Total votes	2,701,925	100.00		
Registered voters/turnout	2,740,920	98.58		
Source: Inter-Parliamentary Union
