= 1981 Rwandan parliamentary election =

Parliamentary elections were held in Rwanda on 28 December 1981, the first since 1969. The country was a one-party state with the National Revolutionary Movement for Development (MNRD) as the sole legal party. The MNRD had been formed as a replacement for the previous sole legal party MDR-Parmehutu following a 1978 constitutional referendum. The new constitution created the National Development Council, a 64-seat national legislature. Two candidates contested each constituency. Voter turnout was 96%.

== Results ==
Party	Votes	%	Seats	+/–
National Revolutionary Movement for Development	2,100,770	100.00	64	New
Total	2,100,770	100.00	64	+17
Valid votes	2,100,770	97.02		
Invalid/blank votes	64,505	2.98		
Total votes	2,165,275	100.00		
Registered voters/turnout	2,244,547	96.47		
Source: Inter-Parliamentary Union
