= Joseph Kavaruganda =

Rwandan jurist (1935–1994)

President of the Constitutional Court of Rwanda
- In office 1979 – 7 April 1994

Personal details
- Born: 8 May 1935; Tare, Rwanda
- Died: 7 April 1994 (aged 58); Kigali, Rwanda

Joseph Kavaruganda (8 May 1935 – 7 April 1994) was a Rwandan jurist who served as president of Rwanda's Constitutional Court. He was killed at the beginning of the Rwandan genocide.

== Early life ==
Joseph Kavaruganda was born on 8 May 1935 in Tare, Ruanda-Urundi. He attended primary school in Tare, and then attended the Kigali Junior Seminary before studying law in Belgium, earning his Doctor of Philosophy in 1966. He returned to Rwanda in 1967 and took up work as a president of Caisse d'Épargne, a credit and savings institution.

== Legal career ==
In 1974, Kavaruganda was appointed Prosecutor General of Rwanda.

As President of the Constitutional Court, Kavaruganda came into conflict with President Juvénal Habyarimana over legal matters. In 1991, he ruled against Habyarimana in a case involving the denial of certain political privileges to opposition parties which the president had allowed to his own party, the Mouvement Révolutionaire National pour le Développement (MRND), such as the ability to broadcast positions on the state radio station, Radio Rwanda. Though a Hutu, Kavaruganda rejected the ideology of Hutu Power, which sought to discriminate against Rwanda's Tutsi population. As a lawyer, he believed that Tutsi exiles had a right to return to the country, and believed that the government should pursue negotiations with the Tutsi-dominated rebel group, the Rwandan Patriotic Front (RPF). His family maintained friendships with Hutus and Tutsis.

Kavaruganda came under increased pressure following his break with Habyarimana. In 1991, a bomb was detonated adjacent his bedroom at his country retreat. Soon thereafter he began receiving a steady flow of death threats from Hutu extremists. As the Rwandan Civil War dragged on, Habyarimana would negotiate with the political opposition and agree to reforms only to soon thereafter renege on them. Tired with what he perceived as obstructionism, in 1993 Kavaruganda wrote a letter to the president, listing the occasions in the previous years in which he had violated laws and broken his promises. He questioned, "When you violate the law, do you do it in the interest of the Rwandan people? In the spirit of the constitution? No."

On 4 August 1993, the Rwandan government and the RPF signed the Arusha Accords to end the Rwandan Civil War. Kavaruganda had assisted in drafting the agreement, which provoked the further ire of Hutu extremists. One edition of Kangura displayed a cartoon of him hanging from a tree with copies of the accords below him, captioned with a threat to kill him if a bi-ethnic power-sharing government was installed. The Arusha Accords stipulated the investiture of an interim president and transitional government. As Chief Justice, Kavaruganda was responsible for swearing-in the officials. On the morning of 4 August Habyarimana was sworn in as interim President at the Parliament building, but then suddenly departed before calling up the new prime minister and cabinet to be inaugurated. Confused and surprised, Kavaruganda left. Habyarimana returned that afternoon with a list of new cabinet members to be sworn in from Hutu extremist parties which had not been agreed upon in the Arusha Accords. Having not been formally invited for a second ceremony, Kavaruganda did not appear and the suggested ministers were not sworn-in. Habyarimana was infuriated, and thereafter he and his political allies regarded Kavaruganda as an ally of the RPF.

To assist with implementation of the Arusha Accords, the United Nations established the United Nations Assistance Mission for Rwanda and dispatched an international peacekeeping force to the country. In early February 1994 members of the Interahamwe, a Hutu extremist militia, stoned Kavaruganda's car. The following day they stormed the Constitutional Court building, but Kavaruganda and his colleagues escaped through his office window. On 17 February UNAMIR commander Roméo Dallaire learned that an extremist group known as the Death Escadron was planning to assassinate Tutsi politician Lando Ndasingwa and Kavaruganda. In response, Daillaire sent peacekeepers to both men's homes to protect them. Kavaruganda, his wife Annonciata, and his two children still living with him felt reassured by their presence.

== Death ==
On 6 April 1994, when President Habyarimana's plane was shot down near Kigali Airport, killing him and triggering the start of the Rwandan genocide. Hutu extremists planned to eliminate moderate Hutu leaders across Kigali before killing Rwandan Tutsis. Kavaruganda's Kigali home was in a neighborhood where numerous government officials lived. Minister of Agriculture Frédéric Nzamurambaho, a moderate Hutu and a neighbor of Kavaruganda, telephoned him shortly after midnight on 7 April to inform him that all MRND members were being evacuated from the neighborhood. Kavaruganda then spoke briefly over the phone with his son, Jean-Marcel, who was in Brussels. Nzamurambaho called again to inform him that members of the Presidential Guard had sealed off the neighborhood, leaving only opposition party members in the area. At dawn gunfire erupted nearby and the family took shelter in their bathrooms. Some time thereafter one of the Ghanaian UN peacekeepers knocked on a window and told Kavaruganda, "There are military men here. They've come to take you away for safekeeping." Kavaruganda went to the front door where he was met by Captain Kabera of the Presidential Guard, while about 40 Rwandan soldiers stood in the front yard and the UN peacekeepers stood on the terrace. Kabera informed him that he had orders to take him to join the opposition politicians. Stalling for time, Kavaruganda insisted on getting dressed and locked the door. He then telephoned the Belgian UN contingent and Ghanaian and Bangladeshi UN outposts, telling him his family was under attack and he needed help. The UN personnel assured him that they would send reinforcements.

While Kavaruganda waited for help, Jean-Marcel telephoned to say that he heard on Belgian radio that opposition party members in Kigali were being killed and urged his father to leave. While Kavaruganda explained that he was trapped, Kabera's men broke down the front door and began searching the house. They found his daughter, Julithe, and put a gun to her head and demanded to know where her father was. She cried to her father for help, and Kavaruganda revealed himself and insisted again on getting dressed. Kabera told him that there was no need to do so and that he had to leave right away. Kabera and the soldiers brought him outside to a waiting truck and drove away with him. The UN peacekeepers watched in the yard and did not resist. He was killed later that day. The remaining soldiers then harassed the family and looted their house before leaving. One of the Hutu-loyalist ministers evacuated during the night, Casimir Bizimungu, returned to the neighborhood soon thereafter to gather some things from his home. Annonciata begged him to take herself, her children, and a neighbor to the Canadian embassy, and he reluctantly did so. They were granted refuge there during the genocide.

== Works cited ==
- Neuffer, Elizabeth (2015). The Key to My Neighbor's House: Seeking Justice in Bosnia and Rwanda. Picador. ISBN 9781250082718.
