= 1988 Rwandan presidential election =

- 19 December 1988
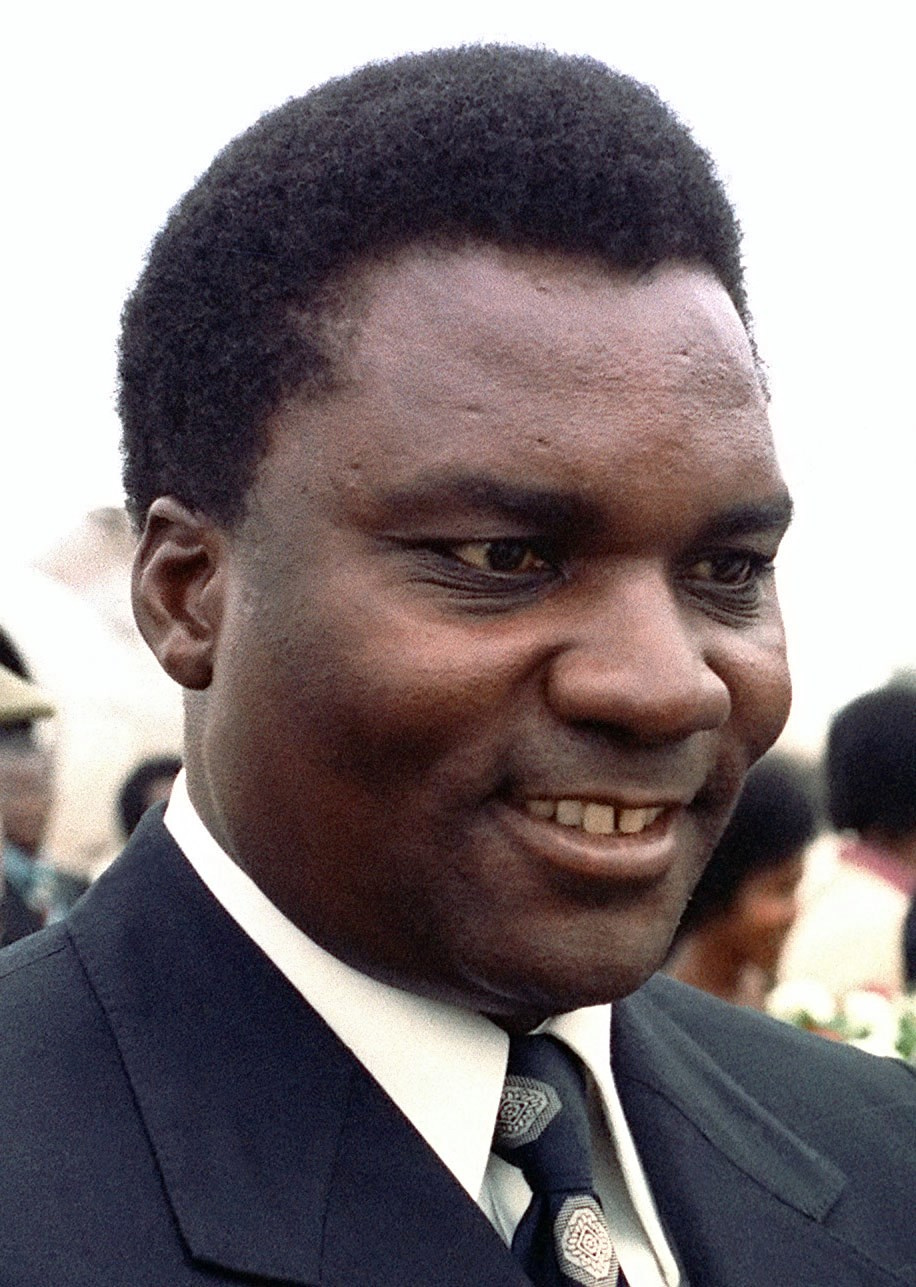
Nominee	Juvénal Habyarimana
Party	MRND
Percentage	99.98%
President before election
Juvénal Habyarimana
MRND
Elected President
Juvénal Habyarimana
MRND

Presidential elections were held in Rwanda on 19 December 1988. The country was a one-party state at the time, with the National Revolutionary Movement for Development (MRND) the sole legal party. Its leader, incumbent President Juvénal Habyarimana, who had taken power in the 1973 coup d'état, was the only candidate. The results showed 99.98% of votes in favour of his candidacy, up from 99.97% in the 1983 elections. The elections were the last presidential contest in Rwanda until 2003.

== Results ==
Candidate	Party	Votes	%
Juvénal Habyarimana	MRND		99.98
Against			0.02
Total			
Source: African Elections Database
