= 1978 Rwandan presidential election =

- 24 December 1978
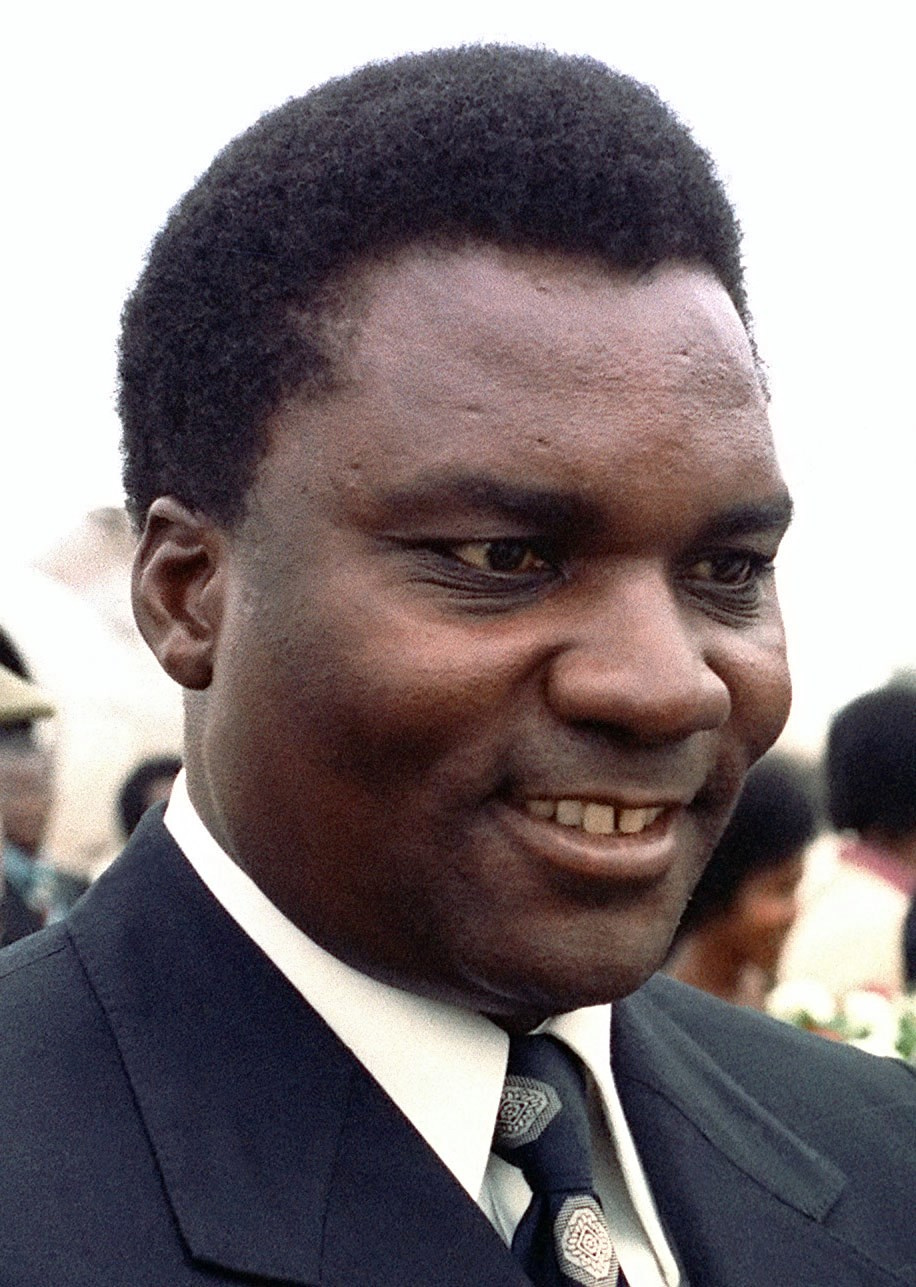
Nominee	Juvénal Habyarimana
Party	MRND
Percentage	98.99%
President before election
Juvénal Habyarimana
MRND
Elected President
Juvénal Habyarimana
MRND

Presidential elections were held in Rwanda on 24 December 1978, a week after the country's new constitution was approved in a referendum. The constitution had made the country a one-party state with the National Revolutionary Movement for Development (MRND) the sole legal party. Its leader, incumbent President Juvénal Habyarimana, who had taken power in the 1973 coup d'état, was the only candidate. The results showed 99% of votes in favour of his candidacy.

== Results ==
Candidate	Party	Votes	%
Juvénal Habyarimana	MRND		98.99
Against			1.01
Total			
Source: African Elections Database
