= Mathieu Ngirumpatse =

War Criminal

- Born: 12 December 1939; Tare, Rwanda
- Status: Sentenced
- Criminal charges: Genocide, crimes against humanity and war crimes
- Penalty: life imprisonment

Mathieu Ngirumpatse (born 1939) is a Rwandan politician, who was president of the MRND.

During a span of three months in 1994 approximately 800,000 ethnic Tutsis and moderate Hutus were killed in what the International Criminal Tribunal for Rwanda (ICTR) ruled was a "joint criminal enterprise" to exterminate Tutsis. Ngirumpatse was sentenced to life imprisonment on 21 December 2011 for his role in the genocide.
