= National Development Council of Rwanda =

Legislature of Rwanda from 1982 to 1994

National Development Council of Rwanda (French: Conseil national de développement) was the unicameral legislature of Rwanda from 1982 to 1994. Members were elected for five-year terms by universal suffrage.

It had 70 members elected by voters from 140 candidates nominated by the MRND, and it exercised legislation on its own. Last elections were held in 1988.

== Speakers ==
Name	Took office	Left office	Notes
Maurice Ntahobari	1982	1988	
Théodore Sindikubwabo	1988	1994	
Joseph Nzirorera	July 1994	1994	

== Elections ==
- 1981 Rwandan parliamentary election
- 1983 Rwandan parliamentary election
- 1988 Rwandan parliamentary election

== See also ==
- Politics of Rwanda
- History of Rwanda
