= Ruhengeri Province =

Former province of Rwanda

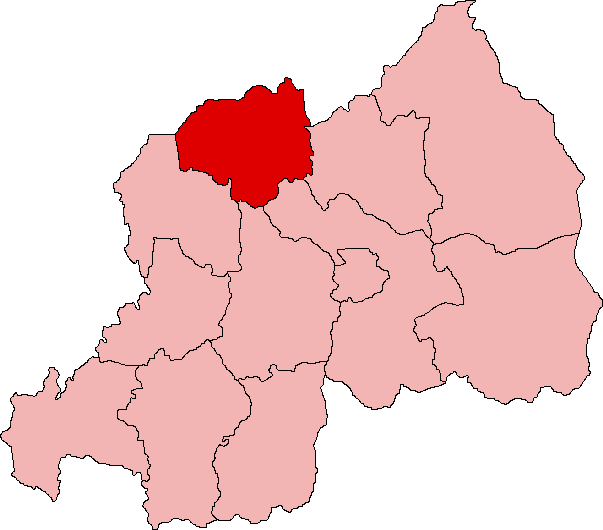
Map showing Ruhengeri Province

Ruhengeri one of the sectors in Musanze district

Ruhengeri Province (prior to January 1, 2002, Ruhengeri Prefecture) was one of the twelve provinces of Rwanda until the end of 2005, when boundaries were redrawn to create five multiethnic provinces. The province was in the north of the country, bordered to the north by Uganda and to the northwest by the Democratic Republic of Congo. It consisted of 10 districts.

It had an area of 1,651.2 square kilometres, of which 1,439.2 are considered habitable. The region is mountainous, and includes the 4,507-meter dormant volcano, Mount Karisimbi.

The 2002 census counted 891,498 people in the province, including 475,424 women and 416,074 men, making Ruhengeri the most populous province of Rwanda, with 11% of the nation's population. It was the fourth most populous province at the time of the 1991 census, which counted 769,297 people, and the fourth most populous in the 1978 census, which counted 531,927.

The 2002 census found that the mean age of the province's population was 20.3 years, while the median was 15.8 years. Most of the inhabitants, 819,987 people, were living in rural areas, with 71,551 in urban areas like the city of Ruhengeri. There were 29,286 urban residents counted in 1991, and 18,942 counted in 1978.

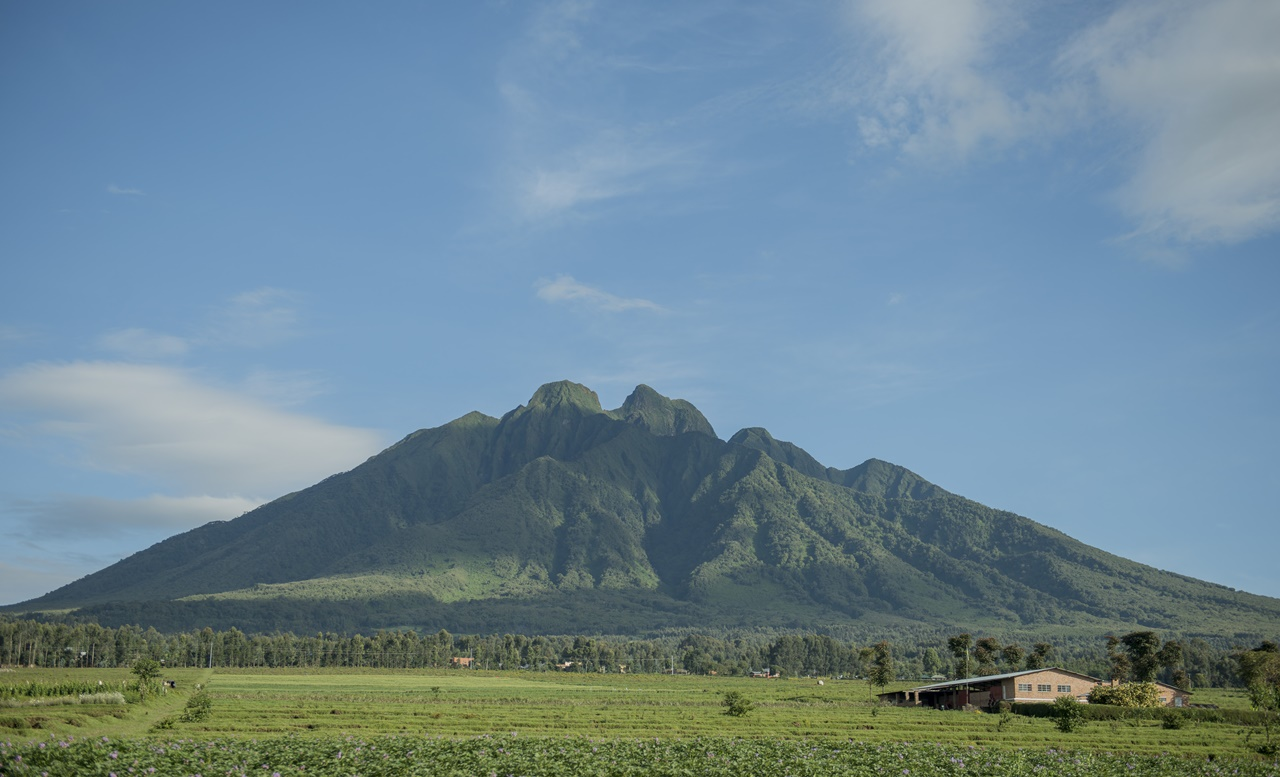
Sabyinyo volcano view from Kinigi sector, Musanze district, Rwanda
