= 1978 Rwandan constitutional referendum =

- 17 December 1978

Results
Choice	Votes	%
Yes	1,830,678	89.09%
No	224,135	10.91%
Valid votes	2,054,813	100.00%
Invalid or blank votes	0	0.00%
Total votes	2,054,813	100.00%
Registered voters/turnout	2,091,688	98.24%

A constitutional referendum was held in Rwanda on 17 December 1978. It followed the 1973 coup d'état by Juvénal Habyarimana and the dissolution of the former sole legal party, MDR-Parmehutu. The new constitution created a presidential republic with no term limits for the President, and made the National Revolutionary Movement for Development the sole legal party. The new constitution replaced the National Assembly, which had been disbanded in 1973, with a new legislative body, the National Development Council.

The constitution was approved by 89% of voters.

== Results ==
Choice	Votes	%
For	1,830,678	89.09
Against	224,135	10.91
Total	2,054,813	100.00
Registered voters/turnout	2,091,688	–
Source: African Elections Database
