= Juvénal Habyarimana =

President of Rwanda from 1973 to 1994

Kinani Major General Juvénal Habyarimana
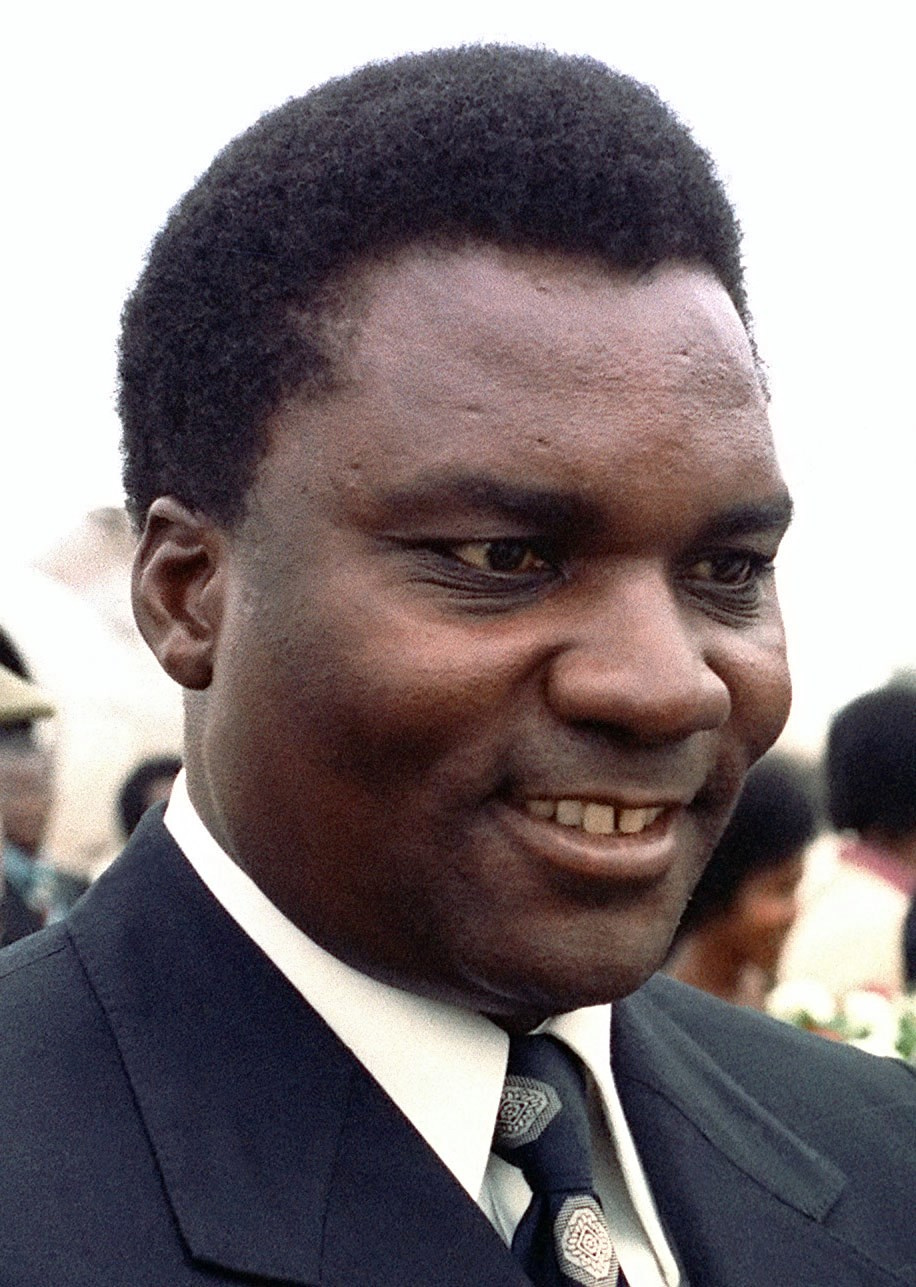
- Habyarimana in 1980

2nd President of Rwanda
- In office 1 August 1973 – 6 April 1994
- Prime Minister: Sylvestre Nsanzimana; Dismas Nsengiyaremye; Agathe Uwilingiyimana
- Preceded by: Grégoire Kayibanda
- Succeeded by: Théodore Sindikubwabo (interim)

Chairman of the Committee for Peace and National Unity
- In office 5 July 1973 – 1 August 1973
- Preceded by: Himself (as Chairman of the Committee for Peace and National Unity)
- Succeeded by: Position abolished (Himself (as President of Rwanda))

Personal details
- Born: 8 March 1937 Gisenyi, Ruanda-Urundi
- Died: 6 April 1994 (aged 57) Kigali, Rwanda
- Cause of death: Assassination (surface-to-air missile)
- Party: MRND
- Spouse: Agathe Kanziga (m. 1963)
- Children: 6
- Education: Lovanium University; Kigali Military Academy

Military service
- Allegiance: Rwanda
- Years of service: 1963–1994
- Rank: Major-general
- Unit: Rwanda National Guard
- Battles/wars: Bugesera invasion Rwandan Civil War

Juvénal Habyarimana (Kinyarwanda: [hɑβɟɑːɾímɑ̂ːnɑ]; French: [ʒyvenal abjaʁimana]; 8 March 1937 – 6 April 1994) was a Rwandan politician and military dictator who was the second president of Rwanda, from 1973 until his assassination in 1994.

An ethnic Hutu, Habyarimana served in several security positions in the First Rwandese republic including minister of defense under Rwanda's first president, Grégoire Kayibanda. After overthrowing Kayibanda in a coup in 1973, he became the country's new president of the Second Rwandese Republic. Habyarimana later continued his predecessor's pro-Hutu policies. He was nicknamed Kinani, a Kinyarwanda word meaning "invincible".

Habyarimana led an authoritarian government, and electoral fraud was suspected for his unopposed re-elections: 98.99% of the vote on 24 December 1978, 99.97% of the vote on 19 December 1983, and 99.98% of the vote on 19 December 1988. During his rule, Rwanda became a totalitarian, one-party state in which his MRND-party enforcers required people to chant and dance in adulation of the president at mass pageants of political "animation". While the country as a whole had become slightly less impoverished during Habyarimana's tenure, the great majority of Rwandans remained in circumstances of extreme poverty.

In 1990, the Tutsi-led Rwandan Patriotic Front (RPF) launched the Rwandan Civil War against his government. After three years of war, Habyarimana signed the Arusha Accords in 1993 with the RPF as a peace agreement. The following year, he died under mysterious circumstances when his plane, also carrying the President of Burundi, Cyprien Ntaryamira, was shot down by a missile near Kigali. His assassination ignited ethnic tensions in the region and helped spark the Rwandan genocide.

== Early life and education ==
Juvénal Habyarimana was born on 8 March 1937, in Gisenyi, Ruanda-Urundi to a wealthy Hutu family. After receiving a primary education, he attended the College of Saint Paul in Bukavu, Belgian Congo, where he graduated with a degree in mathematics and humanities. In 1958 he enrolled in Lovanium University's medical school in Léopoldville. After the beginning of the Rwandan Revolution the following year, Habyarimana left Lovanium and enrolled in the officer training school in Kigali. He graduated with distinction in 1961 and became an aide to the Belgian commander of the force in Rwanda. He married Agathe Kanziga in 1962.

On 29 June 1963 Habyarimana, as a lieutenant, was appointed head of the Garde Nationale Rwandaise. Two years later he was made Minister of the National Guard and Police.

== Presidency ==
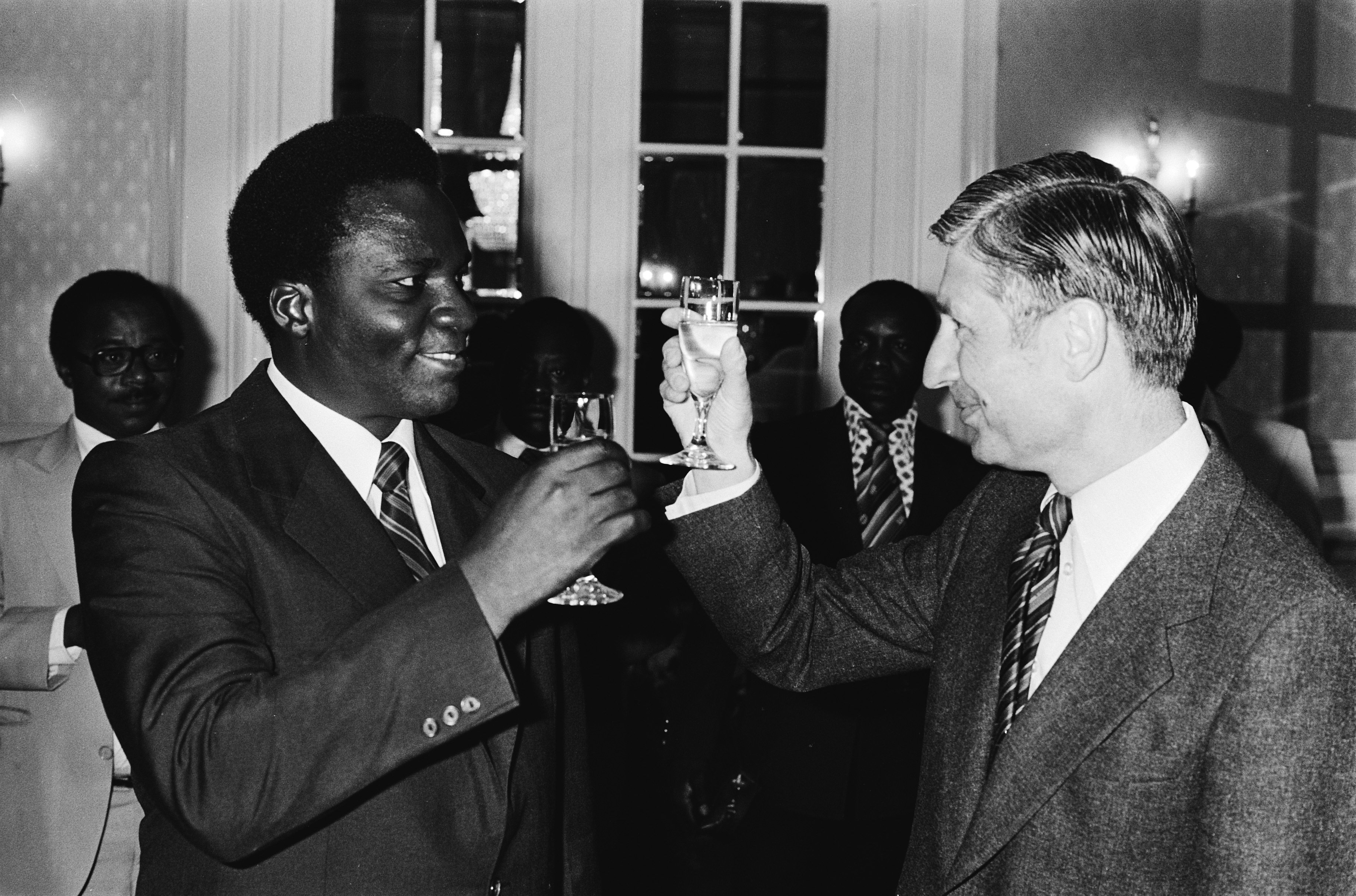
President Habyarimana with Dutch Prime Minister Dries van Agt in the Hague, 1980

On 5 July 1973, while serving as Army Chief of Staff and minister of defense, Habyarimana seized power in a coup d'état against the incumbent President Grégoire Kayibanda, ousting Kayibanda's ruling Parmehutu party. In 1975, he created the Mouvement Révolutionnaire National pour le Développement as the country's only legal party. The government stayed almost entirely in military hands until 1978 when a new constitution was approved in a referendum. At the same time, Habyarimana was elected to a five-year term as president; as president of the MRND, he was the only candidate. He was reelected in 1983 and 1988, both times as the only candidate.

A Hutu himself, he initially won favor among both Hutu and Tutsi groups given his administration's reluctance to implement policies that catered to his primarily Hutu supporters. This restraint did not last and Habyarimana eventually began to oversee a government that mirrored the policies of Kayibanda. Quotas were once again applied to jobs for universities and government services which intentionally disadvantaged Tutsis. As Habyarimana continued to favor a smaller and smaller coterie of supporters, Hutu groups who felt slighted by him cooperated with Tutsis to weaken his leadership. By the start of the invasion from Uganda by the army of the Rwanda Patriotic Front, a rebel army made up mostly of refugee Tutsi who had helped Uganda's Museveni seize control of the presidency, Habyarimana's supporters had shrunk down to the akazu ("little house" or "President's household"), which was mainly composed of an informal group of Hutu extremists from his home region, namely from the northwestern provinces of Gisenyi and Ruhengeri.

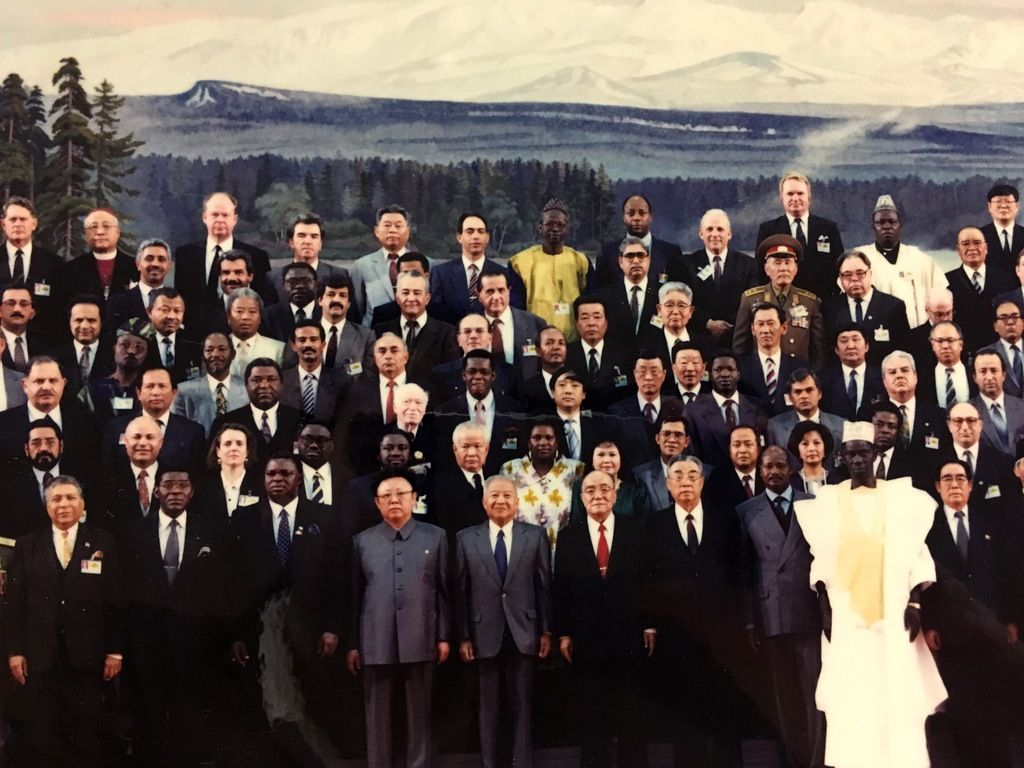
Habyarimana (third row, third from left) at Kim Il Sung's 80th birthday celebration in 1992

From 1975 to 1990, the MRND and the Habyarimana government were one. Under a constitution adopted in 1978, every five years the president of the MRND, Hayarimana, was automatically elected to a five-year term as president of the republic, and was confirmed in office via a referendum. Every four years, voters had the option of choosing between two MRND candidates for the legislature. All citizens of Rwanda became members of the MRND at birth.

Local administrations simultaneously represented the official party as well as the local authority. Legal and party policies were communicated and enforced from the Head of State down through the local administrative units, especially the general policy of Umuganda, in which Rwandans were required to "allocate half a day's labour per week" to infrastructural projects. Habyarimana is sometimes described as a moderate though the party is said to have used right-wing propaganda methods, advanced a conservative political agenda and was anti-communist. Human rights were severely curtailed, and citizens were often required to perform mandatory celebrations of his rule.

However, in 1990, before the Rwandan Patriotic Front (RPF) invasion, and because of mounting pressure from several sources—Rwanda's main ally and financial backer, France, its main funders, the IMF and the World Bank, and from its own citizens wishing for a greater voice and economic change—he agreed to allow the formation of other parties such as the Republican Democratic Movement, the Social Democratic Party, the Liberal Party and the Christian Democratic Party.

=== Economic policy ===
Under Habyarimana's leadership, the country adopted a planned economy called the "liberal planning" based on planned liberalism, and adopted similar economic strategies in 1980 and 1986. In 1988, state-owned enterprises were privatized as part of the liberal planning policy.

Under Habyarimana's government, Rwanda focused on foreign aid and the Rwandan coffee industry, Habyarimana's leadership achieved great accomplishments and economic growth, including the proliferation of health centers at the municipal level, the creation of secondary schools throughout the country, the approval of private schools to supplement the government network from the mid-1980s, integrated rural development projects in different parts of the country, a network of tea projects with modern factories, the improvement of rural housing, water supply, rural electrification and telephone network, the modernization of the national asphalt road network, the construction of inter-municipal roads, the strengthening of the private banking network, and the reforestation of land unsuitable for agriculture. However, problems continued to exist, including an economic crisis caused by a collapse in coffee prices that began in the late 1980s.

=== Rwanda Civil War ===
In October 1990, an attack on Habyarimana's government began when rebels from the RPF, a force of mostly Tutsi Rwandan refugees and expatriates who had served in the Ugandan army (many in key positions), crossed the border from Uganda. Habyarimana was in New York City attending the United Nations World Summit for Children when the attack commenced. When news of the RPF offensive broke, Habyarimana requested assistance from France in fighting the invasion. The French government responded by dispatching troops to his aid under the cover of protecting French nationals. Zairian President Mobutu Sese Seko's contribution was to send several hundred troops of the elite Special Presidential Division (DSP). The Zairian soldiers raped Rwandan civilians in the north of the country and looted their homes, prompting Habyarimana to expel them within a week of their arrival.

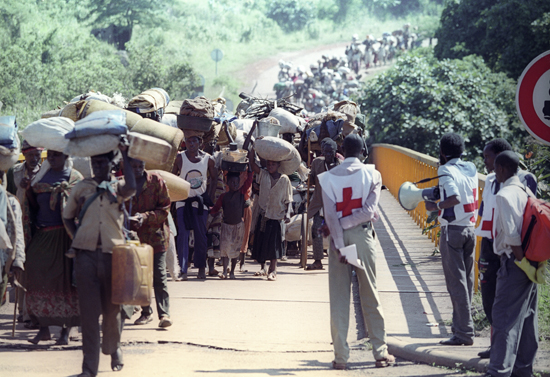
Red Cross volunteers monitoring and assisting displaced populations during the Rwandan Civil War, 1994.

With French assistance, and benefiting from the loss of RPF morale after Fred Rwigyema's death, the Rwandan Army enjoyed a major tactical advantage. By the end of October, they had regained all the ground taken by the RPF and pushed the rebels all the way back to the Ugandan border. Habyarimana accused the Ugandan Government of supplying the RPF, establishing a "rear command" for the group in Kampala, and "flagging off" the invasion. The Rwandan Government announced on 30 October that the war was over.

On 4 August 1993 the Rwandan government and the Rwandan Patriotic Front (RPF) signed the Arusha Accords to end the Rwandan Civil War. As stipulated by the agreement, the new transitional government was to be sworn in on 5 January 1994. Habyarimana was sworn in as interim President at the Parliament building, but then suddenly departed before calling up the new Prime Minister and cabinet to be inaugurated. Habyarimana returned that afternoon with a list of new cabinet members from Hutu extremist parties, who had not been agreed upon in the Arusha Accords, to be sworn in. Having not been formally invited for a second ceremony, Chief Justice Joseph Kavaruganda did not appear and the suggested ministers were not sworn in, infuriating Habyarimana.

== Death ==
A map showing places relevant to the assassination of Juvenal Habyarimana.

On 6 April 1994, Habyarimana's private Falcon 50 jet was shot down near Kigali International Airport, killing Habyarimana. Cyprien Ntaryamira, the President of Burundi, the Chief of Staff of the Rwandan military, and numerous others also died in the attack. The plane crashed on the grounds of the presidential residence.

The circumstances of the crash remain unclear. At the time, the Hutu Power media claimed the plane had been shot down on orders from RPF leader Paul Kagame. Others, including the RPF, accused militant Hutus from within Habyarimana's party of orchestrating the crash to provoke anti-Tutsi outrage while simultaneously seizing power.

Since the aircraft had a French crew, a French investigation was conducted; in 2006 it concluded that Kagame was responsible for the killing and demanded that he be prosecuted. The response from Kagame, the de facto leader of Rwanda since the genocide, was that the French were only trying to cover up their own part in the genocide that followed. A more recent French probe in a January 2012 report was falsely reported to exonerate the RPF. Members of Kagame's inner circle have come out publicly stating that the attack was ordered by Kagame himself. These include his former Chief of Staff and Ambassador to the United States Theogene Rudasingwa, the former army chief and Ambassador to India General Kayumba Nyamwasa, the former secretary in the Ministry of Defense Major Jean-Marie Micombero and others.

== Aftermath ==
=== Fate of remains ===
Habyarimana's body was identified lying in a flowerbed at about 21:30 on 6 April by the crash site. The corpses of the victims were taken into the presidential palace living room. Plans were initially made to take his body to the hospital, but the renewal of conflict made this difficult, and instead his corpse was stored in a freezer at a nearby army barracks. His family shortly thereafter fled to France, making no preparations for his burial. At some point following, Habyarimana's remains were obtained by Zairian President Mobutu Sese Seko and kept in a private mausoleum in Gbadolite, Zaire (now the Democratic Republic of the Congo). Mobutu promised Habyarimana's family that his body would eventually be given a proper burial in Rwanda. On 12 May 1997, as Laurent-Désiré Kabila's ADFL rebels were advancing on Gbadolite, Mobutu had the remains flown by cargo plane to Kinshasa, where they waited on the apron of N'djili Airport for three days. On 16 May, the day before Mobutu fled Zaire and the country was renamed the Democratic Republic of the Congo, Habyarimana's remains were burned under the supervision of an Indian Hindu leader.

=== Political consequences ===
The death of Habyarimana ignited a genocide against the Tutsi minority and Hutus who had opposed the government in the past or who had supported the peace accords by extremists from the majority Hutus. Within 100 days, somewhere between 491,000 and 800,000 Rwandans were massacred.

== Family and personal life ==
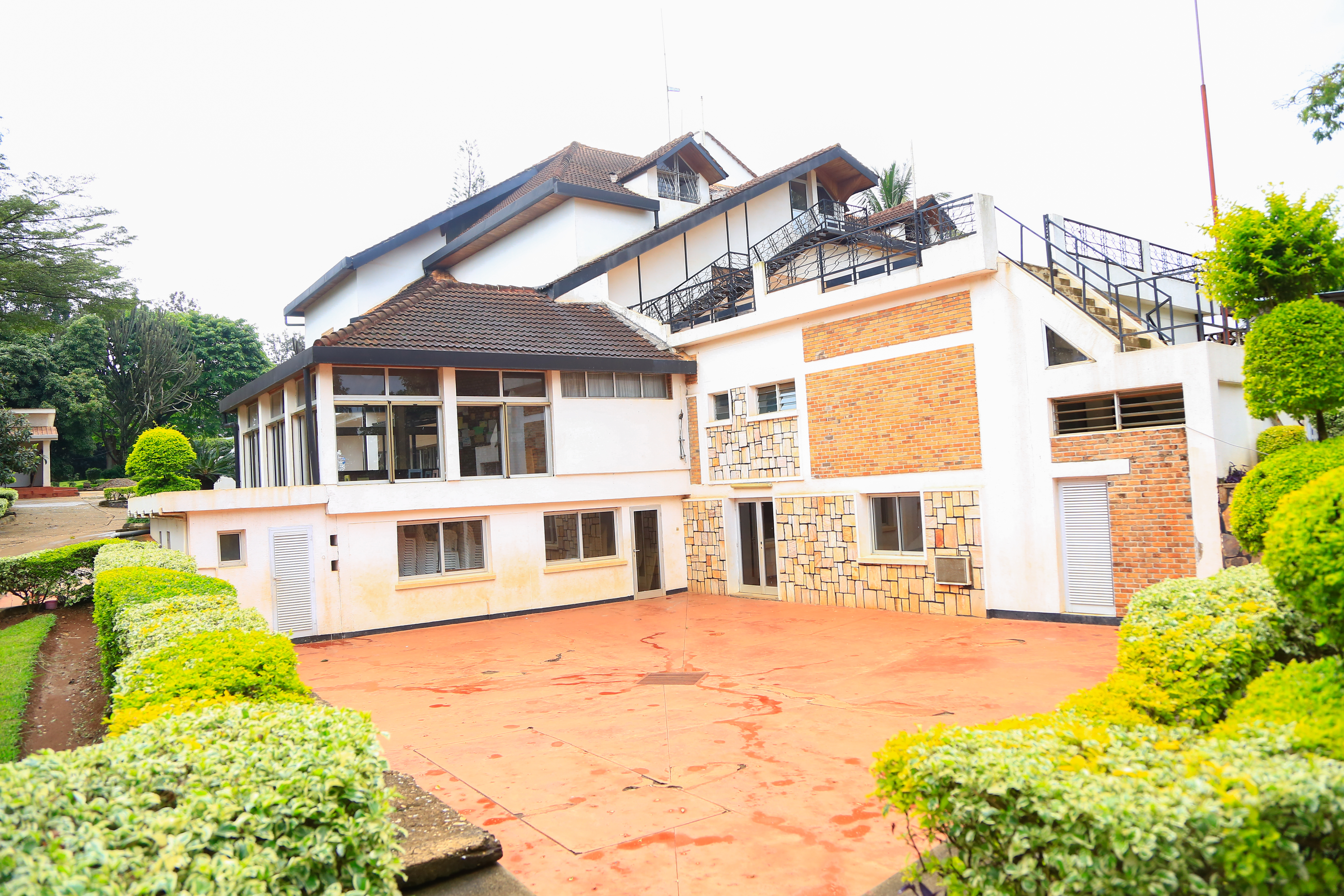
Habyarimana's house

Habyarimana's wife, Agathe Habyarimana, was evacuated by French troops shortly after his death. She has been described as having been extremely influential in Rwandan politics. She has been accused by Rwandan Justice Minister Tharcisse Karugarama of complicity in the genocide and was denied asylum in France on the basis of evidence of her complicity. She was arrested in March 2010 in the Paris region by the police executing a Rwandan-issued international arrest warrant. In September 2011, a French court denied Rwanda's request for extradition of Agathe Habyarimana.

Habyarimana was a devout Catholic.

== See also ==
- List of unsolved murders (1980–1999)
- List of heads of state and government who died in aviation accidents and incidents
- List of heads of state and government who were assassinated or executed

== Citations ==
Political offices
Preceded by Grégoire Kayibanda	President of Rwanda; 5 July 1973 – 6 April 1994	Succeeded by Théodore Sindikubwabo
