= National Revolutionary Movement for Development =

Rwandan ruling party from 1975 to 1994

National Revolutionary Movement for Development Mouvement révolutionnaire national pour le développement
- President: Juvénal Habyarimana (1975–1994); Théodore Sindikubwabo (1994)
- Vice President: Eduoard Karemera
- Founder: Juvénal Habyarimana
- Founded: 5 July 1975 (51 years, 25 days)
- Banned: 15 July 1994 (32 years, 15 days)
- Preceded by: Parmehutu
- Succeeded by: Army for the Liberation of Rwanda (not legal successor)
- Headquarters: Kigali, Rwanda
- Newspaper: Kangura; RTLM (Radio)
- Youth wing: Interahamwe
- Ideology: Hutu nationalism Social conservatism Totalitarianism; Anti-communism; Factions: Hutu Power; Ultranationalism; Ethnonationalism
- Political position: Right-wing to far-right
- International affiliation: Christian Democrat and People's Parties International
- Colours: Black
- National Development Council (1988): 70 / 70

Party flag

The National Revolutionary Movement for Development (French: Mouvement révolutionnaire national pour le développement, MRND) was the ruling political party of Rwanda from 1975 to 1994 under President Juvénal Habyarimana, running with first Vice President Édouard Karemera. From 1978 to 1991, the MRND was the only legal political party in the country. It was dominated by Hutus, particularly from President Habyarimana's home region of Northern Rwanda. The elite group of MRND party members who were known to have influence on the President and his wife are known as the akazu. In 1991, the party was renamed the National Republican Movement for Democracy and Development (French: Mouvement républicain national pour la démocratie et le développement, MRND or MRNDD).

Following the Rwandan genocide in 1994, the party was banned.

== History ==
The party was established by Habyarimana on 5 July 1975, exactly two years after he had ousted the first post-independence president Grégoire Kayibanda in a coup d'état. Habyarimana established a totalitarian state and banned the Parmehutu party, which had been dominated by Hutus from southern Rwanda. The MRND replaced Parmehutu as the sole legally permitted party in Rwanda. A new constitution was approved in a 1978 referendum. It codified the MRND's status as the only legal party, and declared that every Rwandan citizen was automatically a member of the MRND.

Presidential elections were held in 1978 with Habyarimana as the sole candidate. He was re-elected with 99% of the vote. Parliamentary elections followed in 1981, with two MRND candidates contesting each of the 64 seats. Habyarimana was re-elected again in 1983 and 1988, whilst parliamentary elections were held under the same system in 1983 (with the National Assembly enlarged to 70 seats) and 1988.

The party's name was changed after the legalisation of opposition parties in 1991. The youth wing of the party, the interahamwe, later developed into a militia group that played a key role in the Genocide against Tutsi. After Habyarimana's death in April 1994, hardline elements of the party were among the chief architects of the genocide; the Coalition for the Defence of the Republic (CDR), which played a significant role, was originally a hard-line faction of the MRND that became a separate party.

After Rwanda was conquered by the rival Tutsi-dominated Rwandan Patriotic Front led by Paul Kagame, both the MRND and the CDR were driven from power and banned in July 1994.

== Ideology ==
Habyarimana was described as relatively moderate, though he (and his regime) are said to have used propaganda methods, ethnically discriminating against the Tutsi (albeit less extreme than their predecessors), advanced a conservative social agenda and were anti-communist.

== Structure ==
Habyarimana was the president of the party, and as such was the only candidate for president of the republic. However, in a minor concession to democracy, voters were presented with two MRND candidates at Legislative Assembly elections.

== Electoral history ==
=== Presidential elections ===
Election	Party candidate	Votes	%	Result
1978	Juvénal Habyarimana		98.99%	Elected ✓
1983	Juvénal Habyarimana		99.97%	Elected ✓
1988	Juvénal Habyarimana		99.98%	Elected ✓

=== National Development Council elections ===
Election	Party leader	Votes	%	Seats	+/–	Position	Result
1981	Juvénal Habyarimana	2,100,770	100%	64 / 64	▲64	▲1st	Sole legal party
1983	Juvénal Habyarimana	2,364,592	100%	70 / 70	▲6	1st	Sole legal party
1988	Juvénal Habyarimana	2,701,682	100%	70 / 70	Steady	1st	Sole legal party

== See also ==
- Parmehutu
- Edouard Karemera
- Coalition for the Defence of the Republic
