= Bugesera invasion =

1963 Inyenzi rebels attacks and massacres in Rwanda

Date	21–27 December 1963
Location	Rwanda
Result	Rwandan government victory: Anti-Tutsi massacres in Rwanda

Belligerents
Inyenzi movement	Rwanda; Belgium

Commanders and leaders
François Rukeba; Jean Kayitare (WIA); Kigeli V (disputed)	Grégoire Kayibanda; Juvénal Habyarimana (disputed)

Units involved
Armée Royale Rwandaise	Garde Nationale Rwandaise

Strength
Hundreds of exiles Hundreds or thousands of supporters	c. 1,000 soldiers c. 50 Belgian military advisers

Casualties and losses
Hundreds killed	4–9 soldiers killed
- 10,000–20,000 Tutsi civilians killed in subsequent reprisals

The Bugesera invasion (French: Invasion de Bugesera), also known as the Bloody Christmas (French: Noël Rouge), was a military attack which was conducted against Rwanda by rebels called Inyenzi who aimed to overthrow the government in December 1963. The Inyenzi were a collection of ethnically Tutsi exiles who were affiliated with the Rwandan political party Union Nationale Rwandaise (UNAR), which had supported Rwanda's deposed Tutsi monarchy. The Inyenzi opposed Rwanda's transformation upon independence from Belgium into a state run by the ethnic Hutu majority through the Parti du Mouvement de l'Emancipation Hutu (PARMEHUTU), an anti-Tutsi political party led by President Grégoire Kayibanda. In late 1963, Inyenzi leaders decided to launch an invasion of Rwanda from their bases in neighbouring countries to overthrow Kayibanda. While an attempted assault in November was stopped by the government of Burundi, early in the morning on 21 December 1963, several hundred Inyenzi crossed the Burundian border and captured the Rwandan military camp in Gako, Bugesera. Bolstered with seized arms and recruited locals, the Iyenzi—numbering between 1,000 and 7,000—marched on the Rwandan capital, Kigali. They were stopped 12 miles (19 kilometres) south of the city at Kanzenze Bridge along the Nyabarongo River by multiple units of the Garde Nationale Rwandaise (GNR). The GNR routed the rebels with their superior firepower, and in subsequent days repelled further Inyenzi attacks launched from the Republic of the Congo and Uganda.

Shortly after the invasion, the Rwandan regime moved to purge moderate Hutu and leading Tutsi politicians. About 20 opposition leaders from UNAR and the Rassemblement Démocratique du Rwanda were accused of collaborating with the rebels, arrested, and executed in Ruhengeri. Kayibanda assigned ministers in his government to each of the country's ten prefectures—dubbed "emergency regions"—and granted them emergency powers to defend them, including the responsibility of organising Hutu "self-defence" militias. The militias conducted systematic reprisals against Tutsis, with the most intense violence occurring in the prefecture of Gikongoro. Killings lasted into January 1964, with estimates of the death toll reaching as high as 20,000 Tutsi killed. Thousands more fled the country. The massacres provoked international outcry and accusations of genocide, which were denied by the Rwandan government. The invasion and subsequent reprisals left UNAR's domestic bases of support destroyed and resulted in Rwanda becoming a de facto one-party PARMEHUTU state, while the status of the GNR was also improved. Inyenzi attacks persisted for several years but were easily repulsed. There remains disagreement over whether the reprisal killings of Tutsis constituted genocide.

== Background ==
=== Rwandan Revolution ===
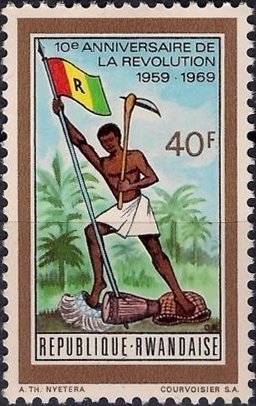
1969 stamp celebrating the Rwandan Revolution

Following the end of World War I in 1918, the victorious states partitioned the colonies of the defeated German Empire. Belgium was awarded the mandate of Ruanda-Urundi—two conjoined territories in East Africa—under the auspices of the League of Nations. In Ruanda, the Belgian colonial administration undermined the traditional monarchy, promoted Christianity, and centralised governance under their direct rule. As part of this, the Belgians institutionalised a racial hierarchy which favoured the Tutsi ethnic minority at the expense of the Hutu majority. The Belgians supported racial theories which held the Tutsis to be of superior, non-African origin and entrusted them with privileged access to education and administrative positions, while most Hutus were relegated to economic subservience to help Belgian businesses.

Ruanda's population became heavily Christian, and most of its Christians were Catholic. A small Hutu counter-elite began to form after World War II, consisting of persons who had been granted access to education and publications through the Catholic Church. Catholic officials maintained close links with the Hutu elite. The latter began to promote an ideology known as Hutu Power, which challenged Tutsi-minority domination of Ruanda as an exploitation of the majority by foreigners. One of the new leaders of the Hutu elite was Grégoire Kayibanda, a former seminarian who had edited Catholic publications. In October 1959 Kayibanda founded the Parti du Mouvement de l'Emancipation Hutu (PARMEHUTU, Party of the Hutu Emancipation Movement), a political party which called for the end of Tutsi domination of social life and rejected anti-European hostility and supported gradual democratisation. At around the same time, conservative Tutsi created the Union Nationale Rwandaise (UNAR, Rwandese National Union), a party which demanded immediate independence under the Tutsi monarchy. Other parties such as the Rassemblement Démocratique du Rwanda (RADER, Democratic Rally of Rwanda), a moderate grouping, were created but failed to gain popular traction. The Belgians began to show favour towards the staunchly Catholic and anticommunist Hutu elite, as the Tutsi elite and UNAR became more aligned with anticolonialism and socialism. Following a period of ethnic unrest in late 1959 and a Belgian military intervention, the colonial administration replaced a substantial amount of Tutsi chiefs with Hutus. In June 1960 the Belgians hosted municipal elections which were overwhelmingly won by PARMEHUTU.

In January 1961 thousands of Ruandan municipal officials gathered in Gitarama and, acting as a constituent assembly, voted to dissolve the monarchy and replace it with a presidential system. The proposed president, Dominique Mbonyumutwa, then requested that Kayibanda form a new government. This arrangement was later altered to give Kayibanda the presidency. In the September 1961 Rwandan parliamentary election, PARMEHUTU won an overwhelming majority of the seats in the Legislative Assembly. Concurrent to the elections was a referendum on the decision to abolish the monarchy; the population voted in favour of abolition. In February 1962 the United Nations brokered a compromise, the New York Accord, in attempt to ensure Rwandan politics remained inclusive. The agreement called for Kayibanda and PARMEHUTU to form a coalition government with UNAR, guaranteeing the latter two ministerial portfolios in the government. The accord split UNAR into an accommodationist faction committed to working through the coalition, and a restorationist faction intent on using armed force to attack the new government. The restorationist faction organized itself as "UNAR extérieure" in exile. On 17 May 1962 Michel Rwagasana, a leader of UNAR's accommodationist faction, declared before the Legislative Assembly that UNAR was committed to working with the Rwandan government. The restorationists were deeply angered by this statement and it resulted in a total fracture in the party between those who remained in Rwanda and those in exile.

Ruanda-Urundi became independent as the two states of Rwanda and Burundi on 1 July 1962. Kayibanda became President of Rwanda. Fearful of majority rule and facing violence, thousands of Tutsis fled to neighbouring countries. Burundi, which retained a Tutsi monarchy, was the most welcoming for the refugees. The UNAR restorationists formed a government-in-exile, with François Rukeba as Prime Minister. (Note: After the Bugesera invasion, the Rwandan military claimed to have captured "two red-and‐white guerrilla flags reputed to belong to a revolutionary government".) They hoped to place King Kigeli V Ndahindurwa back on the throne through force. However, the exiled UNAR elements were deeply divided, fragmented and disorganised. As they were spread across several countries, communication was arduous and slow, making coordinated actions difficult. The party organisation was also weak, and rivalries between different factions hampered the resistance against the Rwandan government: While the UNAR exiles were led by Kigeli and reactionary monarchists, a substantial left-leaning group existed at the basis. In exile, the UNAR's Marxist wing gradually grew more influential. Internal disagreements led to a reforming of the government-in-exile in May 1963 with Michel Kayihura as Prime Minister and Rukeba retained as Minister of Defence. In February 1963 Kayibanda dropped the UNAR ministers from his government.

=== Inyenzi and GNR ===
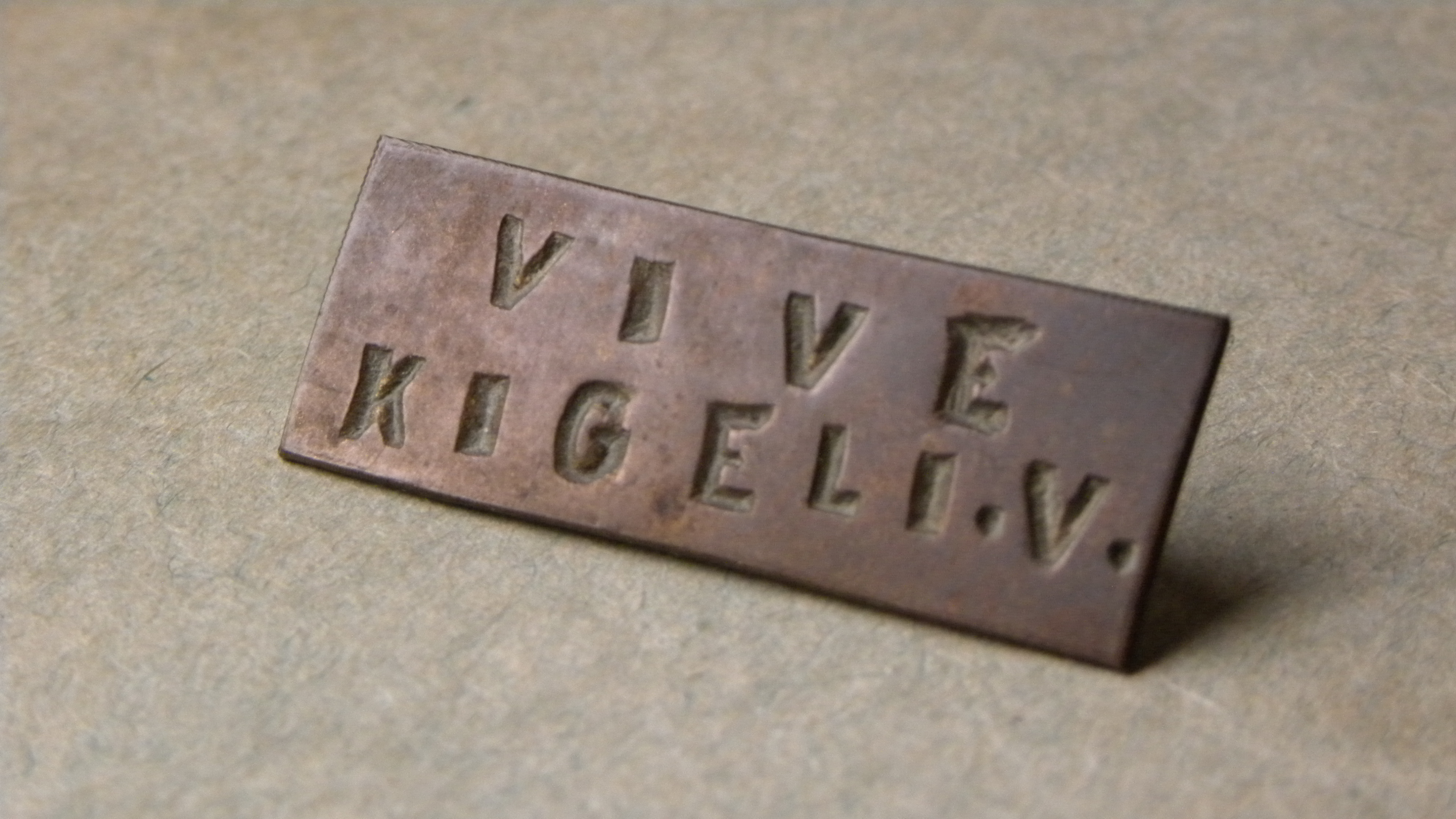
Brass lapel pin Vive Kigeli V "Long Live Kigeli V" from the time of the Rwandan Revolution

Early UNAR Tutsi insurgent activity was confined to acts of terrorism against specific individuals and families. As more Tutsi refugees fled Rwanda, UNAR's exile ranks grew, and more systematic attempts were made to raise bands of combatants to launch raids on targeted areas. Violence in Rwanda dramatically increased as Tutsis fled en masse in early 1960; the first acts of violence were retaliatory attacks by Tutsis against Hutu officials who had mistreated them, but by early 1962 planned raids had become predominant. These were intended to inflict maximum damage to the Hutu-dominated administration and were generally conducted without consideration for government reprisals on local Tutsis. By 1963, about 60,000 Tutsi refugees were living in the Republic of the Congo, 48,000 in Uganda, 25,000 in Burundi, and 16,000 in Tanganyika. As the insurgents were known to attack at night, they were called Inyenzi, meaning "cockroaches". It is unknown whether the rebels themselves or officials of the Kayibanda regime coined the term. While later used in a derogatory sense against Tutsis generally, most contemporary sources refer to the exile rebels with the term in a non-pejorative fashion. Alternatively, the rebels called themselves Inkotanyi ("fighters/warriors"). As a result of the rivalries among the UNAR exile leadership and their geographic division, the insurgents were never able to adopt a cohesive strategy or unified command structure. The People's Republic of China also provided the guerillas with training opportunities and financial support. (Note: The People's Republic of China reportedly chose to support the rebels as a response to Kayibanda's denunciations of communism and his recognition of Chiang Kai-shek's rival Chinese government. The connections of the Inyenzi with leftist Congolese made them more palatable to the Chinese, and the latter hoped that they could gain a foothold in Africa in the case of the insurgents' victory in Rwanda. The People's Republic of China reportedly provided US$ 120,000 to Kigeli and offered to train 10 Inyenzi in revolutionary tactics.) The Tutsi rebels reportedly also enlisted some defectors of the Armée Nationale Congolaise (National Congolese Army), and were known to cooperate with Lumumbist factions in the Congo in the hopes of achieving future assistance against the Rwandan government. However, the Congolese, Ugandan, and Tanganyikan governments were opposed to the radicalisation of the refugees, and tried to curb Inyenzi activity on their soil. In February and March 1962 Inyenzi conducted two raids in the prefecture of Biumba, killing several Hutu policemen and civil servants. From 26 to 27 March the Hutu population of the prefecture retaliated by killing 1,000–2,000 Tutsi civilians, burning their homes, and looting their property.

PARMEHUTU leaders had an exaggerated fear of the Inyenzi, believing they could count on the support of 10,000 exile recruits and forge links with domestic Tutsis. In reality, the UNAR exiles were factionalised and may have possible only numbered several hundred rebels. To counter the threat, the Rwandan government fielded a 1,000-strong Garde Nationale Rwandaise (GNR, Rwandese National Guard), a force which was relatively poorly equipped and preoccupied with guarding Kigali and border outposts. Approximately 50 Belgian officers and subalterns aided it as coopérants techniques militaires (military technical assistants). Despite the military's weaknesses, researcher Simone Paulmichl argued that the even more poorly armed and less organised Inyenzi had no realistic chance of defeating the GNR by 1963. According to researchers Tom Cooper and Adrien Fontanellaz, the GNR proved fairly effective in repelling Inyenzi attacks in the period leading up to the Bugesera invasion.

== Prelude ==
The decision to mount a large attack against Rwanda in late 1963 was made by UNAR leaders in Burundi that November. In August communal elections had been held throughout Rwanda. PARMEHUTU won an overwhelming majority of the offices, but the campaign revealed significant internal disagreements in the party which allowed UNAR to consolidate its domestic support. In October 1963 Kigeli gave $23,000—a portion of the money he had received from the Chinese government—to Papias Gatwa, his personal secretary, with instructions to pass it on to Rukeba, who was in the Congo at that moment. This money enabled UNAR's exiled leaders to buy arms and ammunition. There were rumours that Gatwa and Rukeba had actually embezzled the money given to them by Kigeli, and that Rukeba had ordered the subsequent attacks into Rwanda to "justify" the use of the funds. According to journalist Linda Melvern, the Inyenzi in Burundi also acquired arms with funds garnered by selling food provided by relief organisations to refugees. The Inyenzi could rely upon a large amount of small arms seized from a police armoury in Ngara, Tanganyika earlier in the year. By November, Rukeba's headquarters in Bujumbura had been able to establish effective communications between Tutsi refugee centres in Burundi and Tanzania. Academic René Lemarchand concluded, "if anyone can be said to bear responsibility for the raids that were launched from Burundi, it was Rukeba." Cooper and Fontanellaz argued that the decision for a large invasion, designed to win the conflict in one fell swoop, was motivated by the capture and execution of several rebel leaders in late 1963.

In late November the Inyenzi in Burundi were weakened after Rukeba was arrested by local authorities, who discovered a cache of weapons in his home—purportedly stolen from Congolese rebels—and after the government seized three truckloads of arms near Bujumbura. The first attempt by the Inyenzi in Burundi to invade Rwanda came shortly thereafter on 25 November 1963. Approximately 1,500 refugees from across Burundi mostly armed with spears and bows and arrows, began making the three-day journey towards the Rwandan border. Upon learning of this, United Nations Commission on Human Rights (UNCHR) Representative in Bujumbura Jacques Cuenod and a group of Protestant missionaries alerted the Burundian government and frantically tried to persuade them to stop the attack. Cuenod pointed out that the GNR was probably waiting at the border for the Inyenzi and would certainly defeat them. After some hesitation, the Burundian government dispatched the gendarmerie to disarm the refugees and return them to their camps. One refugee later told UNCHR worker Francois Preziosi that Rukeba had ordered the attack after a meeting in Bujumbura during which Inyenzi leaders from other countries expressed their opposition. The refugee also stated that Kigeli had reportedly asked Rukeba not to launch any attacks in a letter. However, researchers Günther Philipp and Helmut Strizek stated that the rebel force which invaded Rwanda in 1963 was ultimately commanded by Kigeli.

In early December the attitude of the Burundian authorities towards forestalling Inyenzi attacks on Rwanda changed, as a meeting between Rwandan and Burundian delegates in Gisenyi to resolve outstanding issues regarding the dissolution of the Rwanda-Burundi monetary and customs union fell apart due to disagreements. Burundian Vice Prime Minister Pié Masumbuko told a Rwandan official, "Recently we have arrested people who were about to attack you and now you decide to sever economic relations with us. Therefore you do not want collaboration."

== Invasion ==
Map of Rwanda showing the locations of the invasion from Burundi (red), the Congo (blue), and Uganda (green)

On 21 December 1963 the Inyenzi initiated a better-coordinated invasion attempt. The insurgents reportedly called their force the "Armée Royale Rwandaise" (Royal Rwandese Army). According to "reliable sources", Inyenzi leaders hoped to orchestrate simultaneous attacks on Rwanda from four different regions: Kabare, Uganda; Ngara, Tanganyika; Goma, Congo; and Ngozi and Kayanza, Burundi. At 04:30 that day 200–300 Inyenzi mostly armed with hand-made rifles, spears and arrows, crossed the Burundian border at Nemba; some rebels were completely unarmed. This force was led by Rukeba's son Jean Kayitare. As they progressed through the country the Inyenzi were joined by local Tutsis, growing to a size of about 600. About an hour later they overran the Rwandan military in camp in Gako, Kabuga, Bugesera. After ladening themselves with captured arms and ammunition and taking two jeeps, they went to the Tutsi displaced persons camp at Nyamata, where they were joyously received by the locals. According to some observers, the Inyenzi wasted their time by celebrating and drinking alcohol. One rebel participant of the invasion, David Munyurangabo, later claimed that their progress was hindered by supply issues and a lack of coordination. The main Inyenzi leader, Jean Kayitare, had been seriously wounded during the fighting at Gako and was evacuated to Burundi, resulting in a confused chain of command among the insurgents. With their ranks having grown to 1,000–7,000, the Inyenzi force eventually proceeded towards Kigali.

Aaron Segal wrote that Rwandan leaders initially panicked when faced with invasion, fearing a multi-pronged attack supported by Burundi to restore the monarchy. In contrast, historian Dantès Singiza wrote that Major Camille Tulpin—a Belgian military adviser and the de facto head of the Sûreté Nationale Rwandaise—and leaders of the GNR had become informed of the Inyenzi's plans beforehand and aimed to draw them into an ambush. According to François-Xavier Munyarugerero and military historian Frank Rusagara, Lieutenant Juvénal Habyarimana—the commander of the GNR—organised the government counter-offensive. Conversely, Segal wrote that the commander handed control over to a Belgian military adviser, who rallied the Garde to stop the incursion. The Inyenzi were stopped 12 miles (19 kilometres) south of the city at Kanzenze Bridge along the Nyabarongo River by multiple units of the GNR led by Belgian officers and equipped with mortars and semi-automatic weapons. The Belgian officers who were most involved included Commandant Frans, Captain Dubois, and Chief Adjutant Florquin. Among the leading Rwandans involved were Second Lieutenant Ruhashya and Second Lieutenant Mbonampeka as well as cadets from the Rwandan officers' school in Butare. In the ensuing battle the Inyenzi were defeated by the GNR's superior firepower, with several hundred Tutsis and several Congolese killed. It was reported that on one of the bodies of the Congolese the GNR found the Inyenzi's invasion plans and a list of ministers they wished to install upon overthrowing the government. Tulpin accused domestic UNAR politicians of knowing about the document. The Inyenzi survivors fled towards the Burundian border. (Note: Inyenzi veteran David Munyurangabo claimed that the Inyenzi decided to retreat due to their internal problems, taking 40,000 civilian refugees with them to protect them from the Rwandan government. However, this narrative is contradicted by other sources which describe the rebels as being routed and fleeing in disorder.) According to Segal, four Rwandan soldiers were killed in the fighting at Gako. The New York Times reported that the Inyenzi executed four Rwandan soldiers they had captured as they retreated. According to Cooper and Fontanellaz, the Inyenzi retreat was covered by snipers who killed two GNR soldiers, and the rebels killed seven prisoners once back in Burundi.

From 21 to 22 December several small raids were launched by Inyenzi operating from Kivu, Congo across the Ruzizi plain towards Cyangugu. The GNR rebuffed them and executed about 90 prisoners. From Uganda, one group of Inyenzi led by Kibibiro attempted to reach the Rwandan border but was stopped by the local authorities on 25 December. Two days later about 600 Inyenzi crossed into Rwanda at Kizinga. Armed mostly with spears, bows, and machetes, they attacked Nyagatare. The GNR was alert for further incursions and thus the Inyenzi were almost immediately repelled by 110 GNR soldiers armed with semi-automatic rifles. The insurgents suffered 300 dead. The survivors fled back into Uganda, where they were captured or killed by a company of the Uganda Rifles. (Note: While the Inyenzi had initially cultivated support in Uganda through Tutsi refugee communities and the sympathies of the government of the subnational Kingdom of Buganda, Ugandan Prime Minister Milton Obote and his government cracked down on their efforts, as he distrusted Buganda authorities and sought to avoid increasing tensions with neighbouring states.) The attacks from Tanganyika never occurred.

== Repression and atrocities ==
=== Purge of politicians ===
Shortly after the invasion, the Rwandan regime moved to purge moderate Hutu and leading Tutsi politicians. Pierre Claver Karyabwite, vice president of the UNAR youth wing, was tipped off by a local official that UNAR's leadership was to be executed. He drove to Nyamirambo, where UNAR was headquartered and where Rwagasana and party president Joseph Rutsindintwarane lived to warn them of the danger. According to Karyabwite, the two refused to flee. About 20 politicians associated with UNAR and RADER were incarcerated—some of them purportedly appeared on the list of the Inyenzis' desired ministers— and soon thereafter they were taken to Ruhengeri and executed on Nyamagumba hill. (Note: There is disagreement over the circumstances of the detaining of the politicians and their executions. Catholic historian J. J. Carney wrote that the GNR arrested "hundreds" of Tutsi leaders on 21 December and that the politicians were taken to Ruhengeri that evening, put through a secret tribunal overnight—through which over 20 were found guilty of treason, and executed the following day under the alleged instructions of a Belgian military attaché. According to journalist Vincent Gasana, they were arrested on 23 December, taken to Ruhengeri and tortured, and executed the following morning under the supervision of Major Tulpin. Political scientist Filip Reyntjens stated that 15 politicians were executed at Ruhengeri at the order of Belgian military officer Pilate. Lemarchand wrote that the politicians were arrested on 23 December and executed at Ruhengeri "less than a week later". Singiza wrote that the politicians were moved on the night of 22/23 November and executed by a police firing squad on the orders of three Belgian advisers: Tulpin, Commissioner Henri Pilate, and Sub-commissioner Iréné Durieux.) Among those killed were Rutsindintwarane, Rwagasana, as well as RADER president and vice-president Prosper Bwanakweli and Lazare Ndazaro. When asked by Lemarchand why the prisoners were killed in Ruhengeri and not Kigali, a Hutu official stated that Ruhengeri was "the safest spot" for the executions. Most common UNAR sympathisers were arrested but not killed. They were held in Kigali and released six months later. Four Tutsi Catholic priests were detained for allegedly collaborating with the Inyenzi. The apostolic nuncio personally intervened to prevent the execution of several Bugesera Tutsis accused of helping the exiles.

=== Killings of Tutsis ===
In the aftermath of the invasion, Kayibanda hurriedly assigned ministers in his government to each of the ten prefectures—dubbed "emergency regions"—and granted them emergency powers to defend them, including the responsibility of organising Hutu "self-defence" militias—autodéfense civile. Burgomasters and the prefects were heavily involved in the creation of the militias. Radio Kigali made repeated broadcasts warning the population to be "constantly on the alert" for Tutsi terrorists. Roadblocks were established across the country. Many Hutus feared that the invasion would restore Tutsi rule over Rwanda.

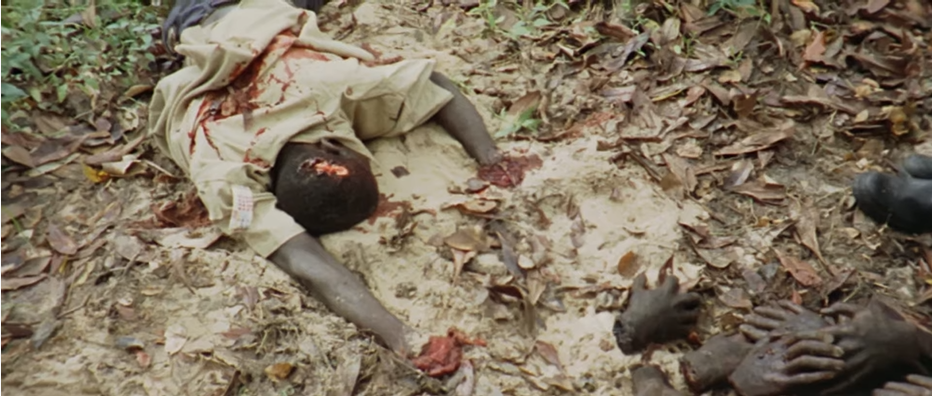
Tutsi murdered by Hutu militia in January 1964

Killings of Tutsis began on 23 December. Hutu militias killed 98 Tutsis in Cyangugu and 100 in Kibungo. Massacres in the prefecture of Gikongoro occurred at the initiative of Prefect André Nkeramugaba. Addressing a meeting of burgomasters and PARMEHUTU activists, he reportedly said, "We are expected to defend ourselves. The only way to go about it is to paralyze the Tutsi. How? They must be killed." The Gikongoro killings began in earnest on 25 December, as Hutus equipped with clubs, spears, and machetes (Note: According to one missionary's account, only "a few notables and [PARMEHUTU] propagandists" had guns.) systematically killed thousands of Tutsis throughout the prefecture. (Note: Lemarchand listed 5,000 Tutsis killed in the prefecture, whereas historian Timothy J. Stapleton estimated 5,000–8,000 deaths, and Carney estimated 8,000–14,000 deaths.) Thousands more sought refuge at the Catholic missions in Kaduha and Cyanika. Minister of Agriculture Damien Nkezabera was assigned to Gikongoro and also helped direct the reprisals. At one point he requested that the missionaries in Kaduha and Cyanika turn over the Tutsis who were hiding in their missions, but the priests refused to accede to his wishes. They requested that the massacres be brought to an end, but the authorities did not stop them until 29 December. Some Catholic and Protestant missionaries equipped with rifles stopped Hutu mobs so Tutsis could seek shelter in their missions. The full extent of peasant participation in the massacres in Gikongoro remains unknown.

The violence quickly spread to other areas, particularly Bugesera and Rusomo. and included acts of extreme brutality; one missionary reported that a group of Hutus "hacked the breasts off a Tutsi woman, and as she lay dying forced the dismembered parts down the throats of her children, before her eyes." Tutsis were clubbed to death, beheaded, burned alive or thrown to crocodiles in the rivers. The Hutu mobs seemed to prefer blunt weaponry during the massacres, with one mob member stating, "We are not guilty if there is no blood". At Shigira it was reported that 100 Tutsi women and children chose to drown themselves in the Nyabarongo River rather than be murdered by Hutu mobs. In Bugesera, 5,000 Tutsi were murdered, and thousands more fled. Some prefects and PARMEHUTU leaders exploited the situation for political gain; realising that by killing Tutsis they could make land "available" to Hutus, they encouraged the massacres to build their political prospects. Sporadic killings lasted through the first two weeks of January 1964. More Tutsis fled Rwanda to escape the violence; 6,000 went to Uganda as a direct result of the massacres, while thousands of others fled to the Murore region of Burundi.

== Aftermath ==
=== Death toll ===
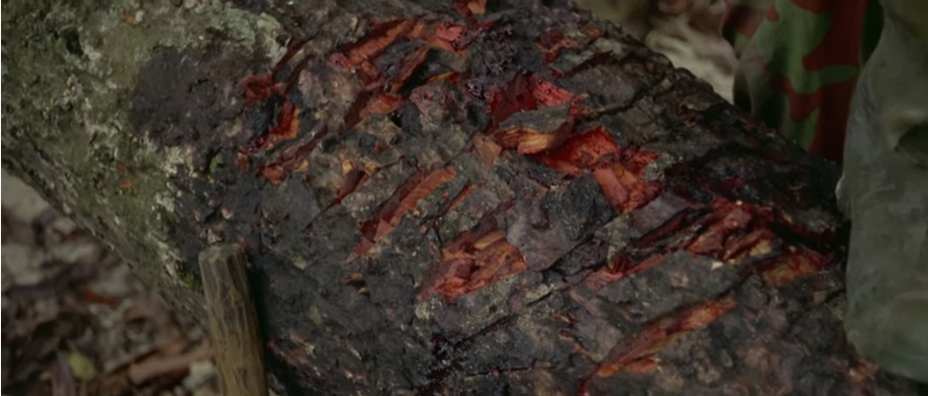
Bloodied tree stump used by Hutu militias to cut off the hands of Tutsis

In its first reports on the killings, Radio Rwanda, the state broadcaster, stated that 750 people had been killed—350 Inyenzi during their attack and 400 civilians. The Rwandan government later issued a white paper in March 1964 which listed 870 deaths. Lemarchand characterised these figures as "patently inaccurate" and estimated that at least 10,000 Tutsis died in the reprisals. The UN estimated 1,000–3,000 deaths, while the World Council of Churches suggested that between 10,000 and 14,000 Tutsis were killed. Estimates of the death toll of civilians in the repression reach as high as 20,000. Lemarchand argued that determining the precise number of casualties was "impossible".

=== Public criticism and response ===
Within Rwanda, Catholic Church officials quickly reacted to the violence. In his Christmas sermon at Kabgayi Cathedral, Archbishop André Perraudin condemned the invasions and the reprisals, appealing for peace and subtly critiquing the government's actions against the political opposition, saying, "the measures of justice and legitimate defence which should be taken by those who retain power can only be approved by God if we make a generous effort of perfect fidelity to his holy laws." Following consultations with one another, Rwanda's four Catholic bishops released a joint statement on the violence, which focused more on the "armed incursions of terrorists" who were "criminals, above all those knowing very well the incalculable evils resulting from their machinations." The document also implored the international community to do more to resolve the Tutsi refugee crisis, but did not make any requests of the Rwandan government in this regard. The bishops instead asked that the Rwandan authorities "scrupulously respect [God]'s holy law" in identifying and punishing the perpetrators of the invasion. Speaking to the massacres in Gikongoro, they called the mass violence "undignified for Christians but also as simply disgraceful and degrading." To protest his actions during the repression, Catholic priest Stany de Jamblinne refused to serve Nkeramugaba communion.

The Rwandan government heavily censored the media to prevent word of the atrocities from spreading. Aaron Segal of the Fabian Society went to Rwanda soon after the massacres to conduct interviews and draft a report and was questioned by the police. News of the Rwandan reprisals reached the international community about a month and a half after their inception, in February 1964, provoking reactions of surprise and disgust. On 4 February Le Monde wrote of a "veritable genocide" in Gikongoro and asserted that while some Catholic priests had defended the victims of the repression, the local Catholic leadership seemed "to desire above all not to deny the reputation of a government attached to church institutions". The British press reported that British nationals visiting Rwanda from Kenya accused the Rwandan government of engaging "in a deliberate policy of genocide against the country's former rules." Historian Margery Perham advocated for Rwanda's expulsion from the United Nations, saying it had conducted "an appalling breach of the convention on human rights and genocide." An article published in Le Monde on 6 February by British philosopher Bertrand Russell described the situation as a "holocaust...not seen since the extermination of the Jews". On 10 February, Vatican Radio labeled the killings "the most systematic genocide since the genocide of the Jews by Hitler." Perraudin defended the Rwandan government on this angle, saying that the use of the word "genocide" was "deeply insulting for a Catholic head of state." The Catholic Rwandan newspaper, Kinyamateka, also denounced the genocide accusations as "false rumours." In an attempt to be conciliatory towards Rwanda's Catholic leaders, Pope Paul VI sent a message to the bishops on 14 February saying that he was "profoundly saddened" by the violence and was meeting a "fervent appeal for appeasement of spirits, respect of persons, and peaceful cohabitation in fraternal charity."

Kayibanda's government accused its critics of defamation and pushing neocolonial agendas. In March Kayibanda delivered a speech in which he said of the attacks, "Assuming the impossible, that you eventually take over Kigali, how can you measure the chaos of which you will be the first victims? Understand this: it would be the total and precipitated end of the Tutsi race." He blamed the Inyenzi for the massacres, saying, "Who is guilty of genocide? Who organised genocide? Who came looking for genocide? Who wants genocide?" In April President of the Legislative Assembly Anastase Makuza delivered a speech in Paris in an attempt to justify the massacres, saying Rwandan Hutus had acted out of a desire "not to fall victim to the fate of losers".

Burundi was the only state to openly condemn the killings. The Burundian government further accused the GNR of crossing into their territory on 22 January and killing Burundian nationals in the border region. The Burundian military was mobilised, and created a "buffer zone" at the border with Rwanda, forbidding anyone from entering it without authorisation. In turn, the Rwandan government accused Burundi of allowing the raid to occur and potentially backing the attack. Burundian Prime Minister Pierre Ngendandumwe denied his government's involvement in the invasion. (Note: On the morning of 23 December Ngendandumwe had told a Rwandan official in Bujumbura that he knew nothing of the invasion, having first heard of it in a radio report.) He attempted to convince the Organisation of African Unity to convene a meeting on the apparent border incident, but called Russell's allegations an "inaccurate generalization" and claimed "that while the majority of those being killed were Watutsi, many Wahutu had also been killed because the massacres were directed primarily at the opposition UNAR party". The invasion also spawned a debate in the Burundian National Assembly in February over possible sanctions against the Inyenzi. The Hutu parliamentary faction advocated extraditing known Inyenzi to Rwanda, while the Tutsi bloc advised against this. Ultimately, no action was taken. The border violation dispute was dropped in April without official resolution, though by then tensions had subsided. Nevertheless, the invasion led the governments to exchange bitter communiques and insult each other on their state radio stations until 1965.

In response to the killings, United Nations Secretary General U Thant dispatched Special Representative Max Dorinsville to Rwanda on two fact-finding missions. The Rwandan government admitted that "excesses" had occurred but Kayibanda assured Dorinsville that all local authorities were instructed to avoid reprisals. He concluded that "these brutal acts were in no sense dictated by the government in Kigali, but rather took place in areas over which the government had little control due to lack of troops. In such areas a popular militia took reprisals on some of the Batutsi populations as a result of the raids of December 20–21 and the fear and panic which they inspired in the Bahutu population." He then sent a letter to Kayibanda, "expressing the hope that his government would do its utmost to calm and pacify ethnic rivalries resulting from the events of December 20–21." No further action was taken by the UN.

=== National impact ===
In January two UN officials in Rwanda resigned from their posts, saying they could not work in a country "which is practicing genocide". In February the head of the Swiss government's technical assistance team in Rwanda, Auguste Lindt, told Kayibanda that Switzerland would terminate its bilateral aid unless the government conducted an investigation into the killings. A commission of inquiry was subsequently established under the leadership of Procureur de la République (Public Prosecutor) Tharcisse Gatwa. The commission's findings implicated at least 89 people in the killings, including two ministers and some prefects and burgomasters. Kayibanda rejected the results and ordered a new commission to investigate the killings. It released its conclusions in a white paper in March 1964, resulting in much fewer incriminations. Most of those implicated received light prison sentences and afterwards the matter was effectively dropped by the Rwandan government. As a result of international outcry at the massacres, the Belgian government requested the repatriation of Tulpin, Commissioner Henri Pilate, and Sub-commissioner Iréné Durieux for their reported role in the repression. The Rwandan government refused to heed this until Belgium threatened to suspend its bilateral aid; the three men were subsequently released from their official responsibilities.

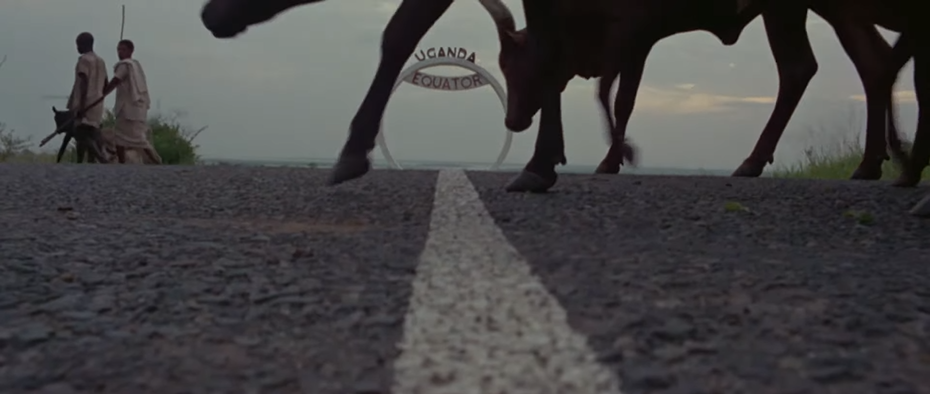
Tutsi refugees fleeing to Uganda with their cattle in January 1964

Politically, the invasion and subsequent reprisals boosted the popular support of the Rwandan government and heightened the status of the GNR. Kayibanda was able to portray himself as the Father of the Nation and champion of the poor Hutu peasants, claiming to defend their hard-won gains of the revolution against the Tutsis who wanted to restore the oppressive feudalism of the old monarchy. UNAR's domestic bases of support were destroyed. Rwanda became a de facto one-party state and the military improved its organisation. While some refugees returned in April as the situation calmed, the Rwandan Tutsi exile population dramatically increased as a result of the massacres, tripling from 120,000 in 1962 to 336,000 in 1964. By late 1964 UNAR's government-in-exile, undermined by internal disagreement and disorganisation, had mostly ceased to exist. It was succeeded by a number of splinter groups which further declined in the following years. PARMEHUTU won all seats in the Legislative Assembly during the 1965 elections. Nkeramugaba launched a candidacy for a seat that year and won an overwhelming majority of the votes in Gikongoro. Foreign-based Inyenzi attacks continued until 1966 but were easily repelled. Kayibanda's regime imposed ethnic quotas based on proportional representation, thus allowing Tutsis to occupy nine percent of civil service positions, but they were excluded from the political sphere. Despite this, Tutsis remained disproportionately represented in the country's higher education system, a fact which continued to generate resentment among Hutus. The country remained free of large-scale ethnic violence until 1973 when new purges against Tutsis and inter-Hutu violence resulted in the overthrow of Kayibanda's regime.

=== Regional impact ===
The failure of the invasion as well as the suppression of Inyenzi activity resulted in the radicalisation of some exiled rebels in the Congo. They consequently joined the Simba rebellion against the Congolese government in 1964, hoping that the uprising's success would result in a regime supportive of the Rwandan exiles. High-ranking Inyenzi such as Rukeba played a relatively important role in the rebel movement before it was ultimately defeated by the Congolese government and its allies. The failures of the Inyenzi in Rwanda and their lack of success in the Congo led to further splintering and infighting among the geographically dispersed rebels. According to Rusagara, "UNAR was virtually dead" by 1965/66 due to its intense factionalism.

== Academic analysis ==
Lemarchand wrote that it was "not accidental" that most of the killings took place in Gikongoro, as it was a base of Tutsi political opposition to the government. He noted that in October 1961 the Belgian Resident in Rwanda had predicted that a major UNAR attack on the country would provoke the government into committing massive reprisals against Tutsis, and the resident stated that the Tutsi population was generally conscious of this. Lemarchand concluded that the leaders behind the invasion were fanatical in their cause to restore UNAR and the monarchy to power and thus blind to the possible outcomes of their actions. According to academic Emmanuel Viret, the Gikongoro massacres "could only assume the scale they did because of the mobilization of the peasantry". Catholic historian J. J. Carney questioned the validity of the supposed list of the Inyenzi's desired ministers found on the dead Congolese, particularly its inclusion of domestic UNAR and RADER leaders, writing, "It seems more likely that PARMEHUTU fabricated the document and used it as a pretext to eliminate any remaining political rivals...there was no love lost between UNAR exiles and internal UNAR leaders...RADER leaders like Bwanakweli and Ndazaro never developed close relations with their rivals in UNAR." Carney also criticised the response of Rwanda's Catholic leaders to the violence, writing "the bishops condemned the violence but did not hold anyone responsible for it." He conceded, "In fairness, the bishops did critique government detentions of the political opposition...[but] seemed to give the benefit of the doubt to the government." Paulmichl argued that the massacres following the invasion achieved PARMEHUTU's ultimate aims, namely to cement its power and to unify the country's Hutus. Melvern compared the 1963 reprisals to the 1994 Rwandan genocide against Tutsis, writing, "The planning and the methods used, thirty years apart, are similar."

There is disagreement over whether the reprisal killings of Tutsis constituted genocide. Numerous survivors of the violence in Gikongoro characterised the killings as genocidal in nature. Lemarchand wrote "it would be...misleading to speak of genocide." According to political scientist Deborah Mayersen, "Despite the many risk factors for genocide...the crisis abated relatively quickly." Melvern wrote that "the accusation of genocide against the Kayibanda regime was unproven." She reasoned that it was "widely accepted" that the killings occurred due to the "extreme interpretation" by local officials of their mandate to organise self-defence groups and noted that the 6,000 Tutsis who fled to Uganda did so unhindered by the government. Political scientist Scott Straus called the reprisals an "ethnic massacre". Carney characterised the reprisals as a "genocidal event". Historian Timothy J. Stapleton wrote, "In retrospect, the massacres of Tutsi in 1963–1964 would seem to correspond to the international legal definition of genocide; they were intentional and aimed at the extermination of at least part of a group defined along racial lines."

== Works cited ==
- Brecher, Michael; Wilkenfeld, Jonathan (1997). A Study of Crisis. University of Michigan Press. ISBN 9780472108060.
- Carney, J.J. (2014). Rwanda Before the Genocide: Catholic Politics and Ethnic Discourse in the Late Colonial Era. Oxford University Press USA. ISBN 9780199982271.
- Cooper, Tom; Fontanellaz, Adrien (2015). The Rwandan Patriotic Front. Solihull: Helion & Company. ISBN 9781910294567.
- Gatwa, Tharcisse (2005). The Churches and Ethnic Ideology in the Rwandan Crises, 1900-1994. Milton Keynes: Regnum Books International. ISBN 9781870345248.
- Harroy, Jean-Paul (1989). Rwanda: souvenirs d'un compagnon de la marche du Rwanda vers la démocratie et l'indépendance [Rwanda: memories of a companion of Rwanda's march towards democracy and independence] (in French) (2nd ed.). Hayez. ISBN 9782871260073.
- Lemarchand, René (1970). Rwanda and Burundi. New York: Praeger Publishers. OCLC 254366212.
- Melvern, Linda (2000). A People Betrayed: The Role of the West in Rwanda's Genocide (reprint ed.). Zed Books. ISBN 9781856498319.
- Mamdani, Mahmood (2002). When Victims Become Killers: Colonialism, Nativism, and the Genocide in Rwanda (reprint ed.). Princeton: Princeton University Press. ISBN 9780691102801.
- Mamdani, Mahmood (2020). When Victims Become Killers: Colonialism, Nativism, and the Genocide in Rwanda (revised ed.). Princeton: Princeton University Press. ISBN 9780691193830.
- Munyarugerero, François-Xavier (2003). Réseaux, pouvoirs, oppositions: La compétition politique au Rwanda [Networks, powers, oppositions: Political competition in Rwanda] (in French). L'Harmattan. ISBN 9782296308244.
- Mushemeza, Elijah Dickens (2007). The Politics and Empowerment of Banyarwanda Refugees in Uganda, 1959-2001. Kampala: Fountain Publishers. ISBN 9789970027194.
- Onoma, Ato Kwamena (2013). Anti-Refugee Violence and African Politics. Cambridge: Cambridge University Press. ISBN 978-1-107-03669-7.
- Paulmichl, Simone (1998). Ferdowsi, Mir A.; Opitz, Peter J. (eds.). "Die Determinante des Völkermordes in Ruanda: Ethnizität als politische Waffe" [The Determinant of the Genocide in Rwanda: Ethnicity as a Political Weapon] (PDF). Arbeitspapiere zu Problemen der Internationalen Politik und der Entwicklungsländerforschung (in German). 26 (1998). Forschungsstelle Dritte Welt am Geschwister-Scholl-Institut für Politische Wissenschaft der Ludwig-Maximilians-Universität München. ISSN 1430-6794.
- Philipp, Günther (1978). "Rwanda". In Sternberger, Dolf; Vogel, Bernhard; Nohlen, Dieter; Landfried, Klaus (eds.). Afrika: Politische Organisation und Repräsentation in Afrika (in German). Berlin: De Gruyter. pp. 1691–1730. ISBN 9783110904802.
- Riot, Thomas; Bancel, Nicolas; Rutayisire, Paul (October 2017). "Un art guerrier aux frontières des Grands Lacs. Aux racines dansées du Front patriotique rwandais" [Warlike art at the borders of the Great Lakes. Expressing one’s roots though dance within the Rwandan Patriotic Front]. Politique Africaine (in French) (147). Karthala: 109–134. doi:10.3917/polaf.147.0109.
- Rosenberg, Sheri P.; Galis, Tibi; Zucker, Alex, eds. (2016). Reconstructing Atrocity Prevention. Cambridge University Press. ISBN 9781107094963.
- Rusagara, Frank K. (2009). Resilience of a Nation : A History of the Military in Rwanda. Kigali: Fountain Publishers Rwanda. ISBN 9789970190010.
- Segal, Aaron (1964). Massacre in Rwanda. Fabian Research Series (240). London: Fabian Society. ISSN 0305-3555.
- Sinema, Kyrsten (2015). Who Must Die in Rwanda's Genocide?: The State of Exception Realized. Lexington Books. ISBN 9781498518659.
- Stapleton, Timothy J. (2017). A History of Genocide in Africa. ABC-CLIO. ISBN 9781440830525.
- Straus, Scott (2013). The Order of Genocide: Race, Power, and War in Rwanda. Cornell University Press. ISBN 9780801467141.
- Strizek, Helmut (1996). Ruanda und Burundi: von der Unabhängigkeit zum Staatszerfall : Studie über eine gescheiterte Demokratie im afrikanischen Zwischenseengebiet [Rwanda and Burundi: From independence to state collapse: Study of a failed democracy in the African Great Lakes region] (in German). Munich: Weltforum. ISBN 3-8039-0451-X.
- Thompson, Allan, ed. (2007). The Media and the Rwanda Genocide. London: Pluto Press. ISBN 9780745326252.
- Waugh, Colin M. (2013). Paul Kagame and Rwanda: Power, Genocide and the Rwandan Patriotic Front. McFarland. ISBN 9781476613154.
- Weinstein, Warren (1976). Historical Dictionary of Burundi. Metuchen: Scarecrow Press. ISBN 978-0-8108-0962-8.
