= David Munyurangabo =

Rwandan retired official (born 1943)

Commissioner in Charge of the Eastern Province in the Rwanda Demobilisation and Reintegration Commission
- In office 2001 – May 2024

RPF Secretary of Security and Mobilisation for "Region D" (Burundi)
- In office 1990–1994

Personal details
- Born: 1943 (age 82–83) Nyanza, Kingdom of Rwanda (Ruanda-Urundi)
- Party: Rwandan Patriotic Front (RPF)

Military service
- Allegiance: Inyenzi movement Rwandan Patriotic Army (RPA)
- Years of service: 1962–1968; 1990–1994
- Unit: Jean Kayitare's rebel group (1960s)
- Battles/wars: Bugesera invasion Simba rebellion Rwandan Civil War

David Munyurangabo (born c. 1943) is a Rwandan retired official and former rebel. He participated in the Inyenzi movement of the 1960s, taking part in raids by armed Rwandan exiles who sought to overthrow the Rwandan government of Grégoire Kayibanda. After repeated rebel failures and his own imprisonment in Burundi, Munyurangabo temporarily fought in the Congolese Simba rebellion and rose to become an advisor to prominent Inyenzi leader Jean Kayitare. From 1968, he mostly lived as a civilian in Burundi, though continued to be active among the exiled Rwandan opposition. In the 1990s, he resumed his armed struggle and joined the Rwandan Patriotic Army (RPA). After the Rwandan Civil War, Munyurangabo worked for two decades as an official responsible for the reintegration of ex-soldiers into Rwandan civil life.

== Biography ==
=== Early life and rebel activity ===
Munyurangabo was born in Nyanza, Rwanda, then part of Belgian-ruled Ruanda-Urundi, around 1943. (Note: David Munyurangabo was reported to be 64 in 2007, and 80 in 2024. However, military historian Frank Rusagara described him as being 18 in 1963.) He attended school until 1962, when he became a rebel and joined the armed Inyenzi movement to fight against the new Rwandan government, established during the Rwandan Revolution. Unlike many Inyenzi, Munyurangabo was not particularly loyal to the deposed Rwandan monarchy. At first, he joined a group which launched attacks in Umutara Province, but they were defeated by security forces and fled to Tanzania. There, Munyurangabo and his comrades were imprisoned.

Tanzania repatriated several of Munyurangabo's comrades who were promptly executed by Rwandan authorities. However, he avoided the same fate by chance. He and another Inyenzi were detained at the Muyenzi prison in Ngara when he was recruited into the facility's football team. Even though he had no experience in the sport, Munyurangabo managed to score the winning goal in his first match against a rival prison's team. This greatly boosted his reputation among the Muyenzi prison's wardens who subsequently appointed him their football team captain and granted him temporary leave to that he could get some new clothes. Instead, Munyurangabo used the opportunity to escape, crossing the border to Burundi and seeking shelter at the Kigamba refugee camp, set up for Rwandan refugees and a center of Inyenzi operations.

In Burundi, Munyurangabo joined an Inyenzi group commanded by Jean Kayitare (alias "Masudi") which in turn was loyal to UNAR exile leader François Rukeba. He was part of an raid which captured weaponry from the Ngara police station in early 1963, several armed attacks in Rwanda, and fought in the Bugesera invasion later that year. Even after the rebels' heavy defeat in the Bugesera invasion, he continued to fight as an Inyenzi. Military historian Frank Rusagara assessed that Munyurangabo became a "battle hardened [...] veteran". He was repeatedly arrested by Burundian security forces, but quickly regained his freedom. As the Inyenzi remained ineffective at toppling the Rwandan government and diplomatic pressure gew, however, Burundi became more and more opposed to the rebels' presence in its borders.

=== Simba rebellion and collapse of the Inyenzi movement ===
On 21 April 1965, Munyurangabo and thirty of his comrades were again arrested by Burundian security forces. This time, the insurgents were supposed to be deported to Rwanda, but this extradiction was halted by King Mwambutsa IV of Burundi. Munyurangabo later claimed that his group had "in one way or the other also assisted" the Burundian monarch on previous occasions, explaining his intervention on their behalf. Regardless, the Inyenzi were detained for five months at the Mpinga Central Prison in Bujumbura. There, they were joined by another detainee, Butera, a son of Rukeba and brother of Kayitare. Conditions at the facility were harsh, as Munyurangabo and his comrades were kept in small latrine rooms where they were forced to drink running toilet water to survive and often were near starvation.

However, Munyurangabo and other rebels eventually managed to escape from the prison and fled to Congo-Leopoldville which was embroiled in the Simba rebellion. Various Inyenzi groups had allied themselves with the Simbas, seeking to gain allies for their struggle. Regarding this as "the only choice we had", Munyurangabo and the other prison escapees thus opted to join the Simbas' struggle. In this position, Munyurangabo did not just fight against forces of the Congolese government, but was also part of the Simba contingent which received military training by Cuban revolutionaries under Che Guevara. Munyurangabo and other Inyenzi eventually quit the Simba rebellion, returning to Burundi to resume the struggle against Rwanda. He became part of the "High Command" of Jean Kayitare's rebel group, (Note: Other ranking members of Kayitare's group included Joseph Bitangimpuruza (alias "Mwarimu"), Dolphine Gasana, Alphonse Muhindanziga, Desire Ruzindana, Charles Ngoga, Viatore Habyarimana, and Romeka.) but the Inyenzi were increasingly suppressed by Burundians authorities. Around 1967, Kayitare was killed in a shootout with a member of the Burundian security forces. This event further undermined the morale of the Rwandan rebels who were already viewing their insurgency as unsuccessful and futile. By 1968, Munyurangabo and his comrades had ended their armed struggle, seeking to live a "normal" life in Burundi.

=== Refugee ===
In December 1979, Rwandan diplomatic pressure caused Burundi to expel Munyurangabo and other ex-rebels. He applied for asylum in Kenya, but this was rejected. UNHCR obtained asylum for him in Canada on the condition that his family could only follow him after six months. Feeling that Canada was too far away from his home and not wanting to leave his family, he turned down this offer. Instead, he requested aid from a Burundian friend, Rutagamirwa, who was the father-in-law of Burundian President Jean-Baptiste Bagaza. Rutagamirwa arranged a meeting between Munyurangabo and the president, with the latter actually asking his head of external and internal security agencies, Colonel Nzohabanayo, look into the issue. Much to Munyurangabo's disappointment, Nzohabanayo later informed him that could only stay in Burundi if he found another state which would temporarily take him for three months.

Feeling that "things went back to square one", Munyurangabo temporarily moved to Kinshasa in Zaire. There, he witnessed a demonstration in front of the Burundian embassy, staged by Rwandan refugees to protest against Burundi expelling ex-Inyenzi. After three months, he returned to Burundi. There, Munyurangabo was shocked to discover that Colonel Nzohabanayo held him responsible for the Kinshasa demonstration. The refugee eventually managed to convince the officer that he had nothing to do with the event, ultimately securing permission to stay in Burundi by 1984. He settled in the Ngara neighbourhood of Bujumbura.

=== Rwandan Civil War and RDRC work ===
For the rest of the 1980s, Munyurangabo remained in touch with the wider Rwandan opposition movement. For instance, he repeatedly met with Fred Rwigyema and other Rwandans who were fighting in the Ugandan Bush War. These Uganda-based soldiers eventually founded the Rwandan Patriotic Front (RPF) as a rebel group to invade Rwanda. In 1990, the RPF launched the Rwandan Civil War, and Munyurangabo officially joined the RPF on 8 October of that year. He abandoned his abandoned his business in Burundi to become part of the RPF's armed wing, the Rwandan Patriotic Army (RPA), spending time with other troops in the bush. He served as the RPF's Secretary of Security and Mobilisation for "Region D" (Burundi) during the civil war. After the Rwandan Civil War and the RPF's victory, Munyurangabo was able to return to live in Rwanda.

In 2001, he was appointed Commissioner in Charge of the Eastern Province in the Rwanda Demobilisation and Reintegration Commission (RDRC). In this position, he oversaw the reintegration of former combatants into Rwandan civil society. On 4 July 2007, he received a medal for his contributions to the "liberation cause". In May 2024, aged 80, Munyurangabo retired from the RDRC, being lauded for his work by RDRC Chairperson Nyirahabineza Valerie.
