= Inyenzi movement =

Collection of Rwandan armed groups

- Leaders: François Rukeba; Jean Kayitare "Masudi"
- Dates active: c. 1960–1970s
- Active regions: African Great Lakes region

The Inyenzi movement or Inyenzi guerrilla movement was a collection of Rwandan armed groups in the 1960s. Mainly composed of Tutsi militants, the movement emerged as royalists and radical refugees unsuccessfully sought to defend the Rwandan monarchy during the Rwandan Revolution. Following the establishment of the Hutu-dominated Republic of Rwanda under Grégoire Kayibanda in 1961, the Inyenzi waged an insurgency from exile. Being split into factions based in Burundi, Uganda, Congo-Léopoldville, and Tanganyika (later Tanzania), the Inyenzi were never organizationally united and became ideologically diverse, resulting in the rise of republican factions. Lacking substantial international support and a coherent structure, the movement was unsuccessful in its insurgency against Kayibanda's government. After a failed attempt to gain reliable allies by involving itself in the Congolese Simba rebellion, the Inyenzi suffered from growing infighting and ceased attacks in Rwanda in 1968.

== Etymology ==
The Kinyarwanda term Inyenzi can be translated as "cockroaches", though its origin is unclear and disputed. It is unknown whether the rebels themselves or officials of the Kayibanda regime initially coined the term. A veteran and leader of the movement, Aloys Ngurumbe, stated in 2003 that the term was a rebel invention. He argued that Inyenzi had emerged as an acronym for "Ingangurarugo yemeye kuba ingenzi". This can be translated as "a member of Ingangurarugo who has committed himself to bravery", with Ingangurarugo being the name of traditional division of the Rwandan royal army. Another ex-rebel leader, David Munyurangabo, agreed that Ingangurarugo was a term initially used for the rebel movement, but described Inyenzi as a title mainly used by the Rwandan government.

The Inyenzi label may also have been connected to the insurgents' strategy of attacking at night as well as terrorizing civilians. This could have led Rwandans to liken the rebels to cockroaches which were regarded as pests which mainly move in the dark. If the insurgents chose the label themselves, they may have likened themselves to cockroaches because their nightly operations were "eating away at the vitals of the Hutu state". Though Inyenzi eventually became a derogatory ethnic slur for Tutsi in general, contemporary sources referred to the exile rebels with the term in a non-pejorative fashion. Similarly, later historians have also continued to use the label for the rebel movement.

Alternatively, the rebels called themselves Inkotanyi ("fighters/warriors") or Kamarade ("comrade"). During the Bugesera invasion, the Inyenzi insurgents reportedly dubbed their umbrella force the "Armée Royale Rwandaise" (Royal Rwandese Army).

== History ==
=== Rwandan Revolution and emergence of the Inyenzi ===
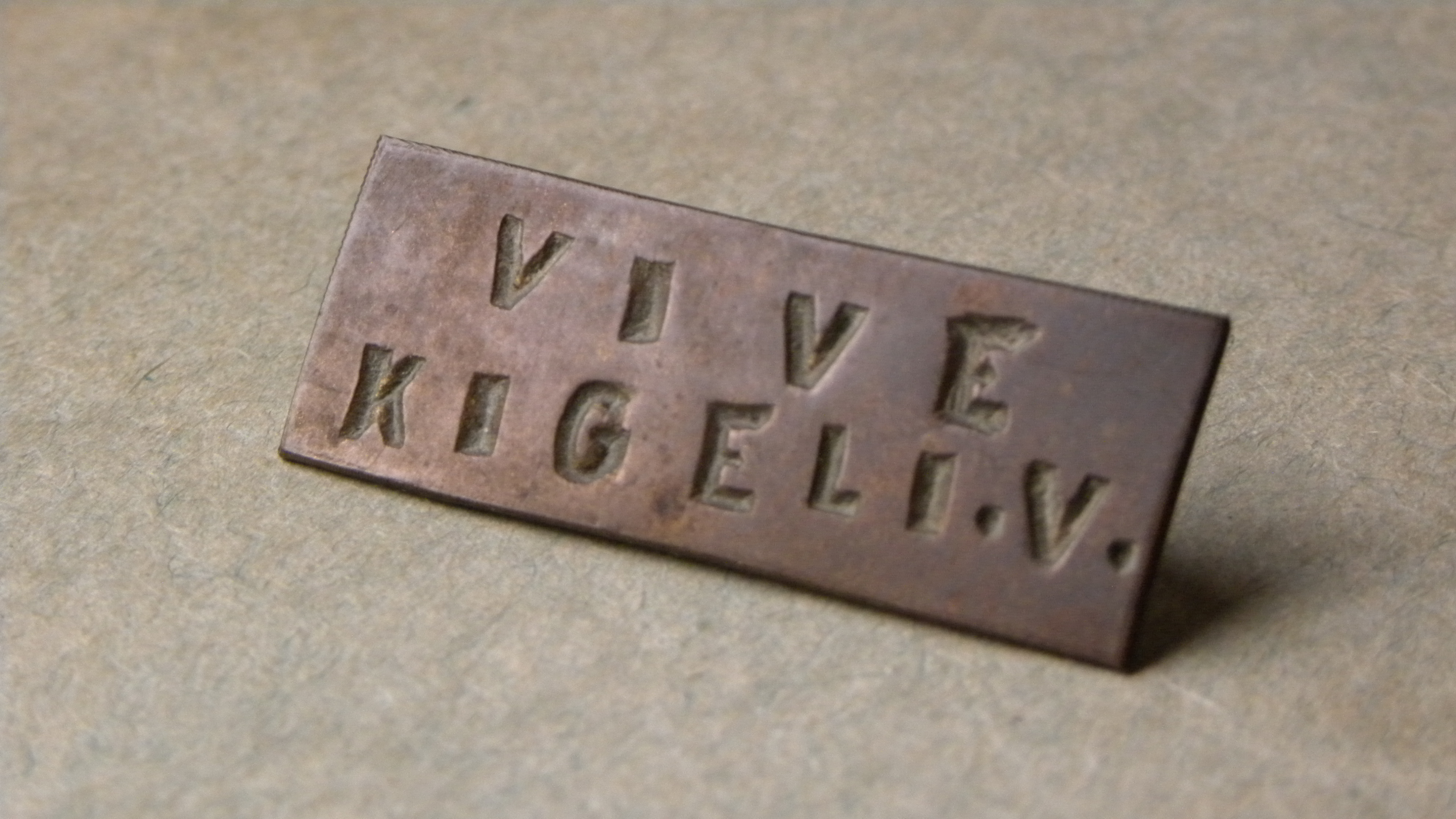
Brass lapel pin Vive Kigeli V "Long Live Kigeli V" from the time of the Rwandan Revolution

By the late 1950s and early 1960s, the Kingdom of Rwanda was subject to the violent Rwandan Revolution. As the country transitioned from Belgian colonial rule to independence, royalists (mainly Tutsi) and republicans (mainly Hutu) struggled for control. Both sides began to arm themselves, and radical royalists sought to revive the old royal army by forming a militia consisting of Tutsi, Twa and Hutu under Tutsi officers. In 1959 King Kigeli V Ndahindurwa appointed a sub-chief, Nkuranga, as the new chief commander of the armed royalists and instigated his followers to target republicans as well as anti-royal nobles. As violence escalated ascross the country, royalist militias carried out several attacks and assassinations, but failed to defeat the republicans. Pro-Kigeli militants suffered a major setback during an attempt to storm Save hill to kill opposition leader Joseph Gitera on 10 November 1959. Afterward, Belgian security forces intervened in force and restored some order, siding with the Hutu opposition and suppressing the royalist forces. Many Tutsi and Twa leaders among the pro-royal militias were arrested, while others fled. Scattered royalist militants reorganized as guerrillas, acquired modern guns, and began to carry out nightly raids, targeting Belgian security forces and Hutu leaders. By the end of 1959, a "maquis" had reportedly emerged in the forests of the Congo-Nile Divide. Munyurangabo dated the origins of the Inyenzi movement to this time. According to historians Déogratias Byanafashe and Paul Rutayisire, some young refugees first began to plan the creation of a rebel army in exile in Uganda in 1960.

Despite the emerging royalist guerrilla activity, Kigeli V's loyalists had been largely defeated and the Hutu republicans had factually assumed government control in Rwanda by 1960. As a result, formerly royalist Twa and Hutu abandoned the king's cause, and the royal militias rapidly shrank in membership. In May 1960, the Belgians created the Garde Territoriale, a Rwandan military unit which was recruited from Hutu and supposed to protect the new Hutu-led government. Kigeli V went abroad, meeting with some of his loyalists to discuss the creation of an army in exile. In August 1960, the monarch declared in Bukavu that his followers were ready to attack Rwanda. Small-scale rebel raids mounted, though these were largely aimed at stealing cattle and killing a few Hutu officials. Growing in strength and enjoying de facto Belgian backing, the Hutu-dominated republicans ultimately overthrew the monarchy in January 1961. Thousands of people, mainly Tutsi, fled Rwanda in response to the republican takeover and ongoing unrest. These refugees would swell the ranks of the Inyenzi.

=== UNAR split and rebel growth ===
The Parti du Mouvement de l'Emancipation Hutu (PARMEHUTU, Party of the Hutu Emancipation Movement) under Grégoire Kayibanda won an overwhelming majority of the seats in the Legislative Assembly in the September 1961 Rwandan parliamentary election, and the monarchy's abolition was formally confirmed by a referendum. These developments were opposed by many Tutsi. To secure a compromise, the United Nations brokered the New York Accord, with PARMEHUTU agreeing to form a coalition government with the Tutsi-dominated Union Nationale Rwandaise (UNAR, Rwandese National Union).

The New York Accord split UNAR into an accommodationist faction committed to working through the coalition, and a militant faction. The latter sought to restore the Rwandan monarchy by using force; it organized itself as "UNAR extérieure" in exile. As the "UNAR extérieure" still focused on diplomatic work, radical refugees organized more substantial armed raids into Rwanda. Small-scale rebel attacks in Rwandan border regions killed about 34 people in course of 1961. Not all of the raids were carried out by Inyenzi, as some could be attributed to bandits and cattle raiders. Byanafashe and Rutayisire emphasized that the earliest Inyenzi were largely independent and were not connected to UNAR, though party members would ultimately assume command of several armed groups.

A more formal structure emerged in the rebel movement in 1962, often described as the founding year of the Inyenzi. By this point, tens of thousands of Rwandans had fled their home country and settled in neighboring states such as Tanganyika (later Tanzania), Uganda, Burundi, and Congo-Léopoldville. The "UNAR extérieure" and Kigeli V began to recruit and arm militant refugees, seeking to eventually invade Rwanda. One self-described co-founder of the Inyenzi movement, Aloys Ngurumbe, argued that the insurgents initially aimed at disrupting the efforts of Hutu parties to stabilize and govern Rwanda. The Inyenzi movement was never able to become a coherent force and was generally quite disorganized, though its leaders were able to partially rely on the still-existing mobilization system of the traditional Rwandan royal army; military historian Frank Rusagara argued that the earliest Inyenzi were probably exiled members of Kigeli V's guard. Despite his importance to the rebel cause, Kigeli V himself never assumed a strong role within the developing rebel movement. Among the budding movement, the most significant early leaders were UNAR politician François Rukeba and his son Jean Kayitare "Masudi" who forged links with the MNC party which had led a short-lived government of the newly independent Congo-Léopoldville.

The Iyenzi operated from refugee camps in Burundi, Tanganyika, Uganda, and the Congo. Of these countries, only Burundi initially tolerated the rebels' presence, though it never armed them. Tanganyika was initially hostile to the rebel movement and extradited arrested insurgents to Rwanda; however, the state later began to support the Inyenzi. The Ugandan and Congolese governments actively sought to suppress Inyenzi activity in their territories.

=== Early insurgency and Chinese aid ===
In 1962, the Inyenzi increased their raids into Rwanda, though these efforts did not produce tangible results. Instead, their raids often targeted civilians, undermining the rebels' support among the population. Furthermore, Kayibanda's government quickly implemented draconian policies in response to the raids, brutalizing and intimidating any potential Inyenzi supporters after each attack. One early example of the resulting mass violence was the Byumba massacre of March 1962, when 1,000 to 2,000 UNAR members –mainly Tutsi, but also Hutu– were murdered after Inyenzi had killed policemen and civil servants in raids at Nkana, Mugira, and Gatuna. Furthermore, the Ministry of Interior and the Rwandan National Guard (GNR) started to plan for self-defense militias to secure the countryside against insurgents. Inside Rwanda, the UNAR accommodationist faction sought to distance itself from the Inyenzi, declaring the insurgents "criminals" who committed "terrorist acts". UNAR had completely fractured into opposing factions by mid-1962.

In early 1963, the rebels overran a Tanganyikan police station in Ngara and captured weaponry, one of the few successes of the movement. In the night of 3-4 July 1962, about 80 to 100 Inyenzi led by Nzamwita Jovite moved from Goma across the Congo–Rwanda border, advancing into the volcano-dominated area of northwestern Rwanda. Unlike previous raids, this operation aimed at taking territory to use as a rebel base. Yet the Rwandan government had been warned, and the GNR ambushed the Inyenzi contingent on 5 July, killing a large number and capturing four who were publicly executed in Ruhengeri.

Meanwhile, Kigeli V managed to secure Chinese aid to the Inyenzi. The Communist People's Republic of China sought to gain a foothold in central Africa, and regarded the Rwandan insurgents as potential springboard for this purpose. The alliance with the ostensibly royalist Inyenzi was resulted from circumstantial factors: Kayibanda's regime had denounced communism and recognized Chiang Kai-shek's rival Chinese government, causing the People's Republic to regard the anti-Kayibanda insurgents with approval. Furthermore, the existing connections of the Inyenzi with the leftist MNC made them more palatable to the Chinese. Yet the Chinese support remained very limited, as the People's Republic of China reportedly provided US$ 120,000 to Kigeli V and trained 10 Inyenzi in revolutionary tactics for guerrilla warfare and population mobilization.

=== Bugesera invasion ===
With the Chinese aid improving their military fortunes, some Inyenzi felt that a large attack on Rwanda should be organized. The decision to mount such an operation was made by UNAR leaders in Burundi in late 1963. In October 1963 Kigeli V gave $23,000—a portion of the money he had received from the Chinese government—to Papias Gatwa, his personal secretary, with instructions to pass it on to Rukeba, who was in the Congo at that moment. This money enabled UNAR's exiled leaders to buy arms and ammunition. There were rumours that Gatwa and Rukeba had actually embezzled the money given to them by Kigeli V, and that Rukeba had ordered the subsequent attacks into Rwanda to "justify" the use of the funds. Yet the Inyenzi preparations for the large attack became widely known in Burundi by November 1963, and it was feared that the GNR had been forewarned. Various Inyenzi leaders reportedly argued that they should halt the operation, and even Kigeli V allegedly requested the rebels to pause their attacks. It is disputed whether Rukeba or Kigeli V ultimately ordered the invasion to go ahead.

The preparations culminated in the Bugesera invasion of December 1963. It was planned as a four-pronged operation by hundreds of rebels, organized as Inyenzi bands from Burundi, Uganda, Tanganyika, and Congo-Léopoldville. The contingents from Burundi crossed the border on 21 December and overran a military camp in Gako, Bugesera, but their advance on Kigali was stopped and defeated by the GNR and allied Belgian forces. The attacks from the Congo and Uganda were easily repelled by the GNR at the borders. The attacks from Tanganyika never occurred. In response to the Bugesera invasion, Kayibanda's government and Hutu militias carried out massacres which probably killed between 10,000 and 20,000 civilians across Rwanda. The large majority of the victims were Tutsi, but moderate Hutu politicians and accommodationist UNAR members were also targeted and killed. The accommodationist UNAR was effectively destroyed by the purge. Kayibanda publicly blamed the Inyenzi for the violence, and also declared that continued rebel operations would result in the "end of the Tutsi race".

=== Decline and involvement in the Simba rebellion ===
After the failure of the Bugesera invasion, Inyenzi attacks in Rwanda declined in numbers; the movement never recovered from this defeat. The last major raids by Inyenzi into Rwanda took place in Bugarama in 1964 and Nshili as well as Bweyeye in 1966. Meanwhile, several Inyenzi bands in Congo-Léopoldville had become radicalized by their repeated setbacks. They consequently joined the Simba rebellion against the Congolese government in 1964, hoping that a Simba victory would result in a regime supportive of the Rwandan exiles. The Simbas were broadly left-leaning and described as "Lumumbist" by researcher Ato Kwamena Onoma, with the rebellion being supported by the MNC-L party which had previously developed links to UNAR leaders like Rukeba. Rwandan exiles gradually assumed prominent positions within the Simba hierarchy, with Inyenzi leader Jerome Katarebe serving as Simba chef de cabinet. (Note: René Lemarchand also described Simba commander Louis Bidalira as a Rwandan exile, but Bidalira was an ethnic Fuliru born in Belgian Congo.) The Rwandan exiles held a reputation as good and disciplined fighters among the Congolese insurgents. As a result of their connections with the Simbas, the Inyenzi forged links with leftist states such as Cuba. Rwandan exiles were thus among the rebel forces personally trained by Che Guevara.

However, the Inyenzi alliance with left-leaning groups such as the MNC and states such as China further alienated the rebels from major regional players such France and Belgium. The latter increasingly deemed the Inyenzi as disruptive factions to be destroyed, and these Western states ultimately helped to protect and stabilize Kayibanda's government. Furthermore, the Simba rebellion was defeated by the Congolese government and its allies in 1965. At this point, thousands of pro-Simba Rwandan militants operated in eastern Congo-Léopoldville, and they suffered heavy losses as the insurgency was put down. At the end of 1965, the Simbas were reduced to a few holdouts, and Inyenzi no longer played a significant role in the Congo.

Inyenzi attacks targeting the Rwandan government ceased in 1967. Cuban promises of aid to the Inyenzi, made in 1967, were never fulfilled. Burundi stopped tolerating the Inyenzi presence around this time, confiscating weaponry of the rebel groups of Rukeba and Mudandi. Jean Kayitare was even killed in a shootout with the Burundian police. By 1968, many Inyenzi had laid down arms, and the remainder were disillusioned with their leadership. This caused more infighting, especially among the dwindling royalists and a growing number of exiled activists critical of Kigeli V. Rumors concerning rebel activity in Rwanda persisted until 1972, though the Inyenzi movement had been dismantled by this point.

=== Legacy ===
The Inyenzi rebellion resulted in an increased repression of Tutsi inside Rwanda. The role of the Inyenzi in the Simba rebellion also caused the Congolese government to order the expulsion of all Rwandan refugees from Congo-Léopoldville. Rwandan refugees were consequently the target of ethnic violence and blamed "for all sorts of evil" by Congolese authorities.

According to researcher Jean-Marie Vianney Higiro, the Hutu elite of the Rwandan Republic eventually turned the label Inyenzi "on its head" by using it as a derogatory slur for all Tutsi. By the 1990s, the term became widely used by Hutu hardliners and racists to dehumanise Tutsi. Some ex-Inyenzi such as David Munyurangabo later played a role in the Rwandan Patriotic Front (RPF) and the Rwandan Civil War (1990−1994). From 1999, the new RPF government launched purges of pro-Kigeli royalists in and outside Rwanda, claiming that they had sought to organize an insurgent "army of the king" (Ingabo z'Umwami). Former Inyenzi leader Rukeba was among those who were kidnapped and tortured by Rwandan security forces due to alleged connections with this royalist conspiracy.

== Organization ==
As a result of the rivalries among the UNAR exile leadership and their geographic division, the Inyenzi were never able to adopt a cohesive strategy or unified command structure. They initially relied on the still-existing mobilization system of the old Rwandan royal army. The latter had effectively ceased to exist after World War I, but its traditional structures had persisted and continued to assign each Rwandan to a regiment. The early royalist militias of 1959 were deliberately modelled on the traditional army in regards to their mobilization, command structure, and organization. Among the exiled refugees, however, the old regiment structure was left in disarray and the rebels ultimately rallied into small bands led by individual commanders, many of them political leaders. In general, Inyenzi tended to operate as small armed groups which either sought to assassinate supporters of the Rwandan government or loot money, cattle, and guns. At its height, the movement had thousands of members, most of them Tutsi.

Despite taking some influences from UNAR, the Inyezi movement lacked a unifying ideology. Though Kigeli V was a rallying figure to many exiled royalists, he never assumed an active role as Inyenzi leader. Rusagara argued that the deposed monarch was "very much part of the [rebels'] problem", as he lacked the abilities and "vision" to unite the Rwandan diaspora, squandered funds for his lavish lifestyle, and was often passive when his followers requested orders. This further encouraged factionalism and the development of major ideological differences within the movement. Though many Inyenzi wished for the restoration of the Rwandan monarchy, others were republicans. The anti-Kigeli current in the movement grew over time.

"No one feared battle, we had been trained. [...] We had become very resilient. We could dance for hours, and also jump, attack by surprise, anticipate a blow [...]"

— Athanase Sentore, praising traditional war dances as a training tool (Note: Translated from French. In the original, this reads: "Personne ne craignait la bataille, on avait été formés. [...] On était devenus très endurants. On pouvait danser pendant des heures, et aussi sauter, attaquer par surprise, anticiper un coup.")

Many members of Inyenzi groups regularly practiced traditional Rwandan war dances. These dances had historically functioned as a way of warrior training by honing skills such as control of the body, flexibility, opportunism, endurance, and coordination. These were much-needed abilities for Inyenzi militants, and the dances also helped in regards to mobilization and group cohesion through cultural patriotism. Rebel veterans later retold that the dance training had steeled their bodies and instilled bravery. Leaders of dance groups often rose to officers in the rebel groups, with famous Rwandan musician, dancer and royal aide Athanase Sentore being an example.

=== Known Inyenzi groups ===
- Front de Libération Rwandaise (FLR)
- Movement Populaire Rwandais (MPR)
- Jeunesse Nationaliste Kigeri V
- Congrès de la Jeunesse Rwandaise (COJER)
- Jeunesse de l'UNAR (JUNAR)
- Rwandese Liberation Front

=== Major Inyenzi leaders ===
- François Rukeba (UNAR, JUNAR)
- Gabriel Sebeza (FLR)
- Joseph Mudandi (MPR)
- Léopold Nkurikiye (Jeunesse Nationaliste Kigeri V)
- Kanobayire (COJER)
- Jean Kayitare "Masudi" (JUNAR)
- Aloys Ngurumbe
- Pierre Mungalurire (UNAR)
- Michel Kayihura (UNAR, Rwandese Liberation Front)
- Nzamwita Jovite
- Numa Mpambara
- Nyabujangwe
- Francois Uwiragiye "Saiba"
- David Munyurangabo
- Jerome Katarebe
- Athanase Sentore

== Assessment ==
Byanafashe and Rutayisire assessed three main reasons for the Inyenzi movement's failure: They had a splintered leadership and lacked a coherent ideology; they were divided into various independent groups instead of acting as a united military force; and they never had sufficient equipment due to a lack of reliable foreign allies. Similarly, Rusagara described the Inyenzi movement as "doomed" from the start due to its lack of organization as well as foreign support, never truly threatening Kayibanda's government. Researcher Simone Paulmichl argued that the poorly armed and organised Inyenzi had no realistic chance of defeating the GNR by 1963. Historian Helmut Strizek characterized the Inyenzi movement as a terrorist organization founded by Tutsi nobles who refused to work with a Hutu-led government. According to Strizek, the rebels achieved little aside further escalating existing ethnic hatred and fuelling the catastrophic violence which would mark the next decades of Rwanda's history.
