= Ministry of Interior (Rwanda) =

Government ministry of Rwanda

- Minisiteri y'Umutekano mu Gihugu
- Emblem of Rwanda

Ministry overview
- Jurisdiction: Government of Rwanda
- Headquarters: KG 7 Avenue, Kigali
- Minister responsible: Vincent Biruta, Minister of Interior
- Ministry executive: Benjamin Sesonga, Permanent Secretary
- Child agencies: Rwanda National Police; Rwanda Correctional Service
- Website: mininter.gov.rw

The Ministry of Interior (Kinyarwanda: Minisiteri y'Umutekano mu Gihugu; MININTER) is a government ministry of Rwanda. It is responsible for internal security, public order and correctional services.

The ministry oversees the Rwanda National Police and the Rwanda Correctional Service. Since June 2024, the Minister of Interior has been Vincent Biruta.

== Mandate ==
The mission of MININTER is to maintain internal security, peace and stability. It also ensures that correctional services work well.

The main responsibilities of the ministry are:

- protecting people and property;
- drafting policies, laws and regulations on internal security and correctional services;
- overseeing the work of its affiliated institutions;
- involving citizens in internal security activities;
- preventing the illegal possession of firearms;
- managing explosives used in mining and fireworks;
- cooperating with regional and international security and correctional bodies.

The Permanent Secretary, Benjamin Sesonga, has been in office since January 2022.

The institutions under MININTER include the Rwanda National Police (RNP) and the Rwanda Correctional Service (RCS).

== History ==
A Ministry of Internal Security existed until October 2016. It was then abolished, and the Rwanda Correctional Service was placed under the Ministry of Justice.

On 4 November 2019, the Ministry of Interior was re-established. General Patrick Nyamvumba became its minister. In April 2020, Nyamvumba was removed from office. The ministry was then abolished again.

On 10 December 2021, Alfred Gasana was appointed Minister of Interior. Before this appointment, he worked at the National Intelligence and Security Service (NISS).

On 12 June 2024, Vincent Biruta replaced Gasana. Biruta had previously been Minister of Foreign Affairs.

== Ministers ==
- Musa Fazil Harerimana (until October 2016, Minister of Internal Security)
- Patrick Nyamvumba (November 2019 – April 2020)
- Alfred Gasana (December 2021 – June 2024)
- Vincent Biruta (since June 2024)
