= Vincent Biruta =

Rwandan physician and politician (born 1958)

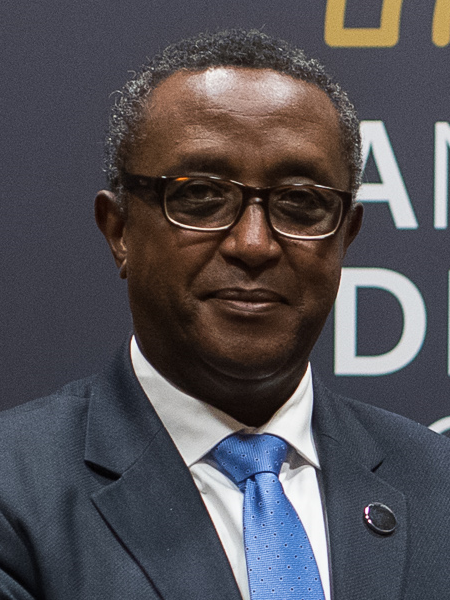
- Biruta in March 2022

Minister of the Interior
- Incumbent
- Assumed office June 12, 2024
- President: Paul Kagame
- Preceded by: Alfred Gasana

Minister of Foreign Affairs and International Cooperation
- In office November 4, 2019 – June 12, 2024
- President: Paul Kagame
- Preceded by: Richard Sezibera
- Succeeded by: Olivier Nduhungirehe

Minister for Environment
- In office August 31, 2017 – November 4, 2019
- President: Paul Kagame

Minister of Natural Resources
- In office July 24, 2014 – August 31, 2017
- President: Paul Kagame

Minister of Education
- In office December 2011 – July 24, 2014
- President: Paul Kagame

1st President of the Rwandan Senate
- In office August 23, 2003 – October 10, 2011
- Preceded by: Office established
- Succeeded by: Jean-Damascène Ntawukuriryayo

3rd President of the Transitional National Assembly
- In office January 19, 2000 – August 23, 2003
- Preceded by: Joseph Sebarenzi
- Succeeded by: Office abolished

Minister of Public Services, Transport and Communications
- In office 1999 – January 19, 2000
- President: Pasteur Bizimungu

Minister of Health
- In office 1997–1999
- President: Pasteur Bizimungu

Personal details
- Born: July 19, 1958 (age 68) Rwanda
- Party: PSD
- Education: National University of Rwanda (MD); Université libre de Bruxelles (Masters in Planning and Management)
- Occupation: Physician; politician

Vincent Biruta (born July 19, 1958) is a Rwandan physician and politician who served as the Minister of Foreign Affairs and International Cooperation from November 2019 to June 2024. He previously served in various other positions in the Rwandan cabinet under Presidents Paul Kagame and Pasteur Bizimungu.

== Background and education ==
He was born on July 19, 1958. He is a trained physician. He also holds post-graduate qualifications in planning and management of health services in developing countries, obtained from Université libre de Bruxelles, in Belgium.

== Career ==
Biruta has a long civil services record in Rwanda, post the 1994 genocide. From 1997 until 1999, he served as the Minister of Health. From 1999 until 2000, he served as the Minister of Public Services, Transport and Communications.

He was the President of the Transitional National Assembly from January 2000 until 2003. From August 2003, until October 2011, he was the first President of the Rwandan Senate, the upper chamber of the bicameral Parliament of Rwanda created in 2003.

In December 2011, he was named the Minister of Education, serving in that capacity until July 2014, when he was named Minister of Natural Resources. He was appointed Minister of Natural resources on July 24, 2014.

He served as the Minister for Environment from August 31, 2017 until his appointment as Foreign Minister in 2019. As foreign minister, Biruta agreed to implement the Rwanda asylum plan with British Home Secretary Priti Patel. His term as minister of foreign affairs ended on June 12, 2024, when he was appointed minister of the interior, succeeding Alfred Gasana. In this capacity Biruta became chair of the council of ministers of the Eastern Africa Police Chiefs Cooperation Organization in January 2025 for a one-year term.

== See also ==
- Politics of Rwanda
