= Transitional National Assembly of Rwanda =

Transitional National Assembly of Rwanda was the unicameral legislature of Rwanda from 1994 to 2003. It was based on Arusha Accords of 1993 following Rwandan Civil War. It had 70 members and it first convened in Kigali on 12 December 1994.

In 2003, it was replaced by a bicameral Parliament of Rwanda.

== Speakers ==
Name	Took office	Left office	Notes
Juvénal Nkusi	1994	10 February 1997	
Joseph Sebarenzi	7 March 1997	6 January 2000	
Vincent Biruta	19 January 2000	23 August 2003	

== See also ==
- Politics of Rwanda
- History of Rwanda
