= Alfred Gasana =

Rwandan politician

Member of the Senate
- Incumbent
- Assumed office 21 October 2025

Minister of Interior
- In office December 2021 – June 2024
- Succeeded by: Vincent Biruta

Alfred Gasana is a Rwandan politician who has been member of the Senate since October 2025. He served as minister of interior between December 2021 and June 2024.

== Career ==
In 2003 Gasana became a member of the Chamber of Deputies for the Rwandan Patriotic Front. In 2010, Gasana was elected chairperson of the Parliamentary Standing Committee on Political and Legal Affairs, replacing Bernadette Kanzayire. Prior to that Gasana headed the Parliamentary Standing Committee on Security and National Sovereignty.

Gasana at one point served as director general of internal security at the National Intelligence and Security Service. While in this position, Gasana became Minister of Interior of the newly re-created ministry in December 2021. His term as minister ended in June 2024 and he was replaced by Vincent Biruta.

In January 2025, Dutch newspaper NRC Handelsblad reported that the Rwandan government had nominated Gasana for the position of Rwandan ambassador to the Netherlands but that the Dutch government had refused this nomination. The Dutch government did not confirm he had been refused.

On 21 October 2025 Gasana together with Valentine Uwamariya was appointed to the Senate by Rwandan president Paul Kagame, replacing Epiphanie Kanziza and André Twahirwa.
