= Michel Rwagasana =

Rwandan politician

Member of the Rwandan Legislative Assembly for Nyanza
- In office 1961–1963

Personal details
- Born: 1927 Ruhango District, Ruanda-Urundi
- Died: 24 December 1963 (aged 35–36) Ruhengeri, Rwanda
- Party: Union Nationale Rwandaise
- Relations: Gregoire Kayibanda (cousin)

Michel Rwagasana (1927 – 24 December 1963) was a Rwandan politician who served as secretary general of the Union Nationale Rwandaise (UNAR) and represented Nyanza in the Rwandan Legislative Assembly from 1961 to 1963. Born to Hutu and Tutsi parents in Ruanda-Urundi, Rwagasana worked for the colonial administration and advised King Mutara III Rudahigwa of Ruanda before cofounding UNAR, a Tutsi-dominated monarchist political party. UNAR lost out to the majority party, Parmehutu led by Rwagasana's cousin Grégoire Kayibanda, but supported the integration of UNAR into a coalition government as the country became independent as the Republic of Rwanda. He was killed in a purge in 1963, and is currently recognized by the Rwandan government as a national hero.

== Early life ==
Michel Rwagasana was born in 1927 in Ruhango District, Gitarama Province, Ruanda-Urundi to a Hutu father and Tutsi mother. He attended primary school in Kabgayi from 1945 to 1950, and then studied for an additional five years at the Groupe Scolaire de Astrida in Butare. Graduating with a diploma in administrative assistance, he joined the Belgian colonial administration in January 1950, working in the Native Labor Office in Bujumbura. He married Suzana Nzayire in 1956 and had five children with her.

== Political career ==
"Our party can assure you that it will spare no effort in working for the achievement of a genuine understanding between the majority and the opposition, which, by virtue of its entry into the government, can no longer be considered an opposition, but a partner."

— Rwagasana on UNAR joining the governing coalition with Parmehutu, May 17, 1962

Ideologically, Rwagasana was a nationalist. He acted as a special secretary for King Mutara III Rudahigwa and served as secretary of the Conseil Superieur du Pays from 1958 until 1959. He cofounded the Union Nationale Rwandaise (UNAR), a monarchist, Tutsi-dominated political party, and became its first secretary general in September 1959. He also emerged as a leader of the progressive faction within the party. Shortly thereafter a relative of Rwagasana, Grégoire Kayibanda, founded the Parti du Mouvement de l'Emancipation Hutu (Parmehutu), which pushed for the democratization of Ruanda's institutions and the political empowerment of Hutu people at the expense of Tutsis. Faced with this exclusionary trend in national politics, Rwagasana and other UNAR leaders went into self-imposed exile in British Tanganyika in 1960. He later returned to continue campaigning for UNAR.

In January 1961 thousands of Rwandan municipal officials gathered in Gitarama and, acting as a constituent assembly, voted to dissolve the monarchy and replace it with a presidential system. The proposed president then requested that Kayibanda form a new government. In the September 1961 Rwandan parliamentary election, Paremhutu won an overwhelming majority of the seats, though Rwagasana was elected on an UNAR ticket in the Nyanza constituency. He subsequently represented the constituency in the Legislative Assembly from 1961 to 1963. Concurrent to the elections was a referendum on the decision to abolish the monarchy; the population voted in favor of abolition. In February 1962 the United Nations brokered a compromise, the New York Accord, in attempt to ensure Rwandan politics remained inclusive. The agreement called for Kayibanda and Parmehutu to form a coalition government with UNAR. The accord split UNAR into an accommodationist faction committed to working through the coalition, and a restorationist faction intent on using armed force to attack the new government. Rwasagana led the accommodationists, but when Kayibanda offered him a ministerial portfolio in his government he refused the position. Rwanda became independent as a republic later that year.

== Death and legacy ==
On 21 December 1963 Rwandan Tutsi exiles from Burundi attacked a military camp in Gako, Bugesera. They then advanced on Kigali before being stopped and defeated by the Rwandan National Guard. The Rwandan regime subsequently moved to purge moderate Hutu politicians and UNAR members, including Rwagasana. Pierre Claver Karyabwite, vice president of the UNAR youth wing, was tipped off by a local official that UNAR's leadership was to be executed. He drove to Nyamirambo, where UNAR was headquartered and where Rwagasana lived to warn him of the danger. According to Karyabwite, he refused to flee, saying, "Don't you get it? I came back to remain with the people. They will only be killed after I am dead. Under no circumstances will I flee to leave them to be killed by Parmehutu." On 23 December Rwagasana and other moderates were detained and taken to Ruhengeri. Over the course of the night they were tortured and early the following morning they were brought to Nyamagumba hill and executed.

Rwagasana's last child was born after his death. His wife died in 1988, and one of his sons died in the 1994 Rwandan Genocide. In February 2002 Ibuka, a genocide remembrance organization, published a list of suggested Rwandan "national heroes", including Rwagasana. He is currently recognized as a national hero by the Rwandan Chancellery for Heroes, National Orders and Decorations of Honour under the Imena category.

== Works cited ==
- Atterbury, Mary Catharine (1970). Revolution in Rwanda. Madison: University of Wisconsin. OCLC 4755754.
- Harroy, Jean-Paul (1989). Rwanda: souvenirs d'un compagnon de la marche du Rwanda vers la démocratie et l'indépendance (in French) (2nd ed.). Hayez. ISBN 9782871260073.
- Lemarchand, René (1970). Rwanda and Burundi. New York: Praeger Publishers. OCLC 254366212.
- Mamdani, Mahmood (2002). When Victims Become Killers: Colonialism, Nativism, and the Genocide in Rwanda (reprint ed.). Princeton: Princeton University Press. ISBN 9780691102801.
- Mamdani, Mahmood (2020). When Victims Become Killers: Colonialism, Nativism, and the Genocide in Rwanda (revised ed.). Princeton: Princeton University Press. ISBN 9780691193830.
- Mushemeza, Elijah Dickens (2007). The Politics and Empowerment of Banyarwanda Refugees in Uganda, 1959-2001. Kampala: Fountain Publishers. ISBN 9789970027194.
- Rosoux, Valerie (2005). "La gestion du passé au Rwanda : ambivalence et poids du silence". Genèses (in French). 4 (61): 28–46. doi:10.3917/gen.061.46.
