= Michel Kayihura =

Rwandan politician and veterinarian

Michel Kayihura (1924–2003) was a Rwandan politician and veterinarian.

== Early life ==
Michel Kayihura was born in 1924. The son of Chief Jean-Berchmans Manzi, he was a member of the Banyiginya clan and the Bakobwa lineage and was ethnically Tutsi. He was a younger brother of Jean-Baptiste Gahamanyi, who served as the Roman Catholic Bishop of Butare from 1962 to 1997.

Kayiruha enrolled at the Groupe Scolaire d'Astrida in 1936. After completing his basic studies in 1940 he began studying veterinary science. On 30 December 1942 he graduated at the top of his class with a diploma in veterinary science. In February 1943 he began work at the Kisenyi veterinary laboratory. He married Véronique Nyirakaragwe and had ten children with her.

== Political career ==
In July 1944 Kayihura was appointed Chief of Nyaruguru. He held this office until 1954, when he became Chief of Bugoyi. He was a close confidant of Mwami (king) of Rwanda, Mutara III Rudahigwa, and accompanied him on his trip to Belgium in 1949. Kayihura also served as vice president of the Conseil Superior du Pays of Ruanda. He became a vice president of the Rwandese National Union (UNAR), an anticolonial political party, after its formation in 1959 and served as a leader of its progressive faction. In October, Governor Jean-Paul Harroy of Ruanda-Urundi attempted to transfer Kayihura from his chiefdom to head off political disorder. Kayihura and two other chiefs who had been reassigned resisted the move and refused to leave their jurisdictions. He was opposed to André Perraudin's prominent role in the Rwandan Catholic hierarchy. When the newly crowned Mwami, Kigeli V Ndahindurwa, called on his loyalists to strike at republicans and anti-royal nobles in late 1959, Kayihura was one of the chiefs who organized attacks.

By December 1959, Kayihura had fled Rwanda and relocated to eastern Belgian Congo, where he met with Kigeli V to discuss the formation of an royalist army in exile. The former chief later relocated to Kenya, where he eventually obtained a doctorate in veterinary science. The UNAR restorationists formed a government-in-exile shortly before Rwanda's independence, with François Rukeba as Prime Minister. Upset by these developments, Kayihura returned to the Congo. Internal disagreements led to a reforming of the government-in-exile in May 1963 with Kayihura as Prime Minister. By late 1964 the government was under a new prime minister but, undermined by internal disagreement and disorganisation, had mostly ceased to exist. Kayihura founded a rebel group, the Rwandese Liberation Front, and spent most of his time traveling between Geneva and Brussels to win foreign support for it.

== Later life ==
Kayihura returned to Rwanda after the 1994 Rwandan genocide. He died in 2003.

== Works cited ==
- Carney, J.J. (2014). Rwanda Before the Genocide: Catholic Politics and Ethnic Discourse in the Late Colonial Era. Oxford University Press USA. ISBN 9780199982271.
- Lemarchand, René (1970). Rwanda and Burundi. New York: Praeger Publishers. OCLC 254366212.
- Weinstein, Warren (1977). "Military Continuities in the Rwanda State". In Mazuri, Ali (ed.). The Warrior Tradition in Modern Africa. Leiden: Brill. pp. 48–68. ISBN 90-04-05646-7.
