= Prosper Bwanakweli =

Prosper Bwanakweli (1924 – December 1963) was a Rwandan chieftain and politician.

== Early life ==
Prosper Bwanakweli was born in 1924 in Bunyambiriri, Ruanda-Urundi to Grand Chief Paul Nturo and Angeline Kampororo. Ethnically, he was Tutsi and descended from the ruling (royal) Banyiginya clan of the Banana lineage. The Banyiginya had ruled Rwanda for centuries. He attended primary schools in Muyunzwe and Kabgayi before enrolling at the Groupe Scolaire de Astrida, where he graduated in 1945. He married Pascasie Mukakimenyi.

== Chieftainship and political career ==
On 2 February 1945 Bwanakweli was made chief of Kabagali in Nyanza District. In the 1950s he served on the Rwandan Conseil Superieur du Pays (High Council of the Land). In 1954 amidst the "Second School War" in Belgium, the Belgian Minister of African Affairs decided to cancel all state subsidies for Catholic schools in the colonies. Most chiefs in Ruanda-Urundi sided with the Catholic Church in the affair. In Rwanda this led to division on the Conseil Superieur between Mwami Mutara III Rudahigwa and a faction led by Bwanakweli. In December 1954 he led 14 councilors in petitioning the Mwami to allow for discussion of the school question in the council. This move was unprecedented and led the Mwami to accused Bwanakweli of committing lèse-majesté. In 1956 he attempted to implement social reforms in his jurisdiction, but Mutara opposed this and transferred him to the remote chiefdom of Rusenyi-Itabire in Kibuye Territory.

Politically, Bwanakweli favored inter-caste cooperation, the election of chiefs, the institution of a constitutional monarchy, and supported agrarian reform following the abandonment of the ubuhake system. On 14 September 1959 he founded the Rassemblement Démocratique du Rwanda (RADER, Democratic Rally of Rwanda), a moderate political party. Its stated goal was "to work towards the realisation of a social, economic, political, and cultural order based on authentic democracy and harmony among the constituent groups of Rwanda." The party never gained much of a following aside from some Tutsi students, as Bwanakweli's ethnicity garnered suspicion among Hutus and his reputation as a progressive democrat who had challenged Mutara alienated conservative Tutsis. He was killed in a political purge in December 1963.

== Works cited ==
- Atterbury, Mary Catharine (1970). Revolution in Rwanda. Madison: University of Wisconsin. OCLC 4755754.
- Lemarchand, René (1970). Rwanda and Burundi. New York: Praeger Publishers. OCLC 254366212.
- Weinstein, Warren; Grotpeter, John J. (1973). The Pattern of African Decolonization: a New Interpretation. Syracuse University. ISBN 9780915984077.
