= François Rukeba =

François Rukeba (born 23 April 1912 - 1989) was a Rwandan politician and rebel leader.

== Early life ==
François Rukeba was born on 23 April 1912 in Murehe, Ruanda-Urundi. He was considered ethnically Hutu by most Rwandans, though he was of mixed origins. According political scientist René Lemarchand, his father was Congolese while his mother was Hutukazi. According to Warren Weinstein, his maternal ancestry traced to the Shi people of the eastern Democratic Republic of the Congo.

== Political career ==
Rukeba was a close companion of the deposed Mwami (king) of Rwanda, Yuhi V Musinga. He was initially a subchief who presided over a jurisdiction near Cyangugu, but was dismissed by the Belgian colonial administration in 1944 after they ruled that he had falsified court register entries. In 1947 the administration served him with a deportation order, and the following year appealed to the Visiting United Nations Mission, accusing the authorities of mistreating him. He grew anti-Belgian in outlook and became a staunch supporter of the monarchy. He eventually found work as a merchant.

Throughout the 1950s, Rukeba petitioned the United Nations for reforms in Ruanda-Urundi. At the funeral of the late Mwami, Mutara III Rudahigwa, on 28 July 1959 Rukeba led the crowd in demanding the naming of a successor to the throne. In August he cofounded the Rwandese National Union (UNAR), a party which quickly became the political voice of Tutsi traditionalists, and was made its president. He founded the party's youth wing. UNAR organised a meeting in Kigali on 13 September, and there Rukeba declared the party's programme and criticised Belgian colonialism. He also declared that, "He who does not belong to this party will be regarded as the people's enemy, the Mwami's enemy, Rwanda's enemy."

== Life in exile ==
Rukeba went into exile in 1961, eventually settling in Burundi. The UNAR restorationists formed a government-in-exile shortly before Rwanda's independence, with Rukeba as Prime Minister. Internal disagreements led to a reforming of the government-in-exile in May 1963 with Michel Kayihura as Prime Minister and Rukeba retained as Minister of Defence. The exiled Mwami, Kigeli V Ndahindurwa, remained nominal head of state of this government, though in time Rukeba lost contact with him. Rukeba and his son Jean Kayitare (alias "Masudi") emerged as important leaders in the Inyenzi movement which sought to overthrow the new Rwandan government of Grégoire Kayibanda. The two forged links to the Congolese MNC party in an effort to gain international support. Another son of Rukeba, Butera, also became active as an insurgent.

On 3 October Rukeba was arrested by Burundian authorities for stealing weapons from Congolese rebels. He was released shortly thereafter due to parliamentary pressure placed upon the Burundian monarchy. He chose to support the Simba rebels in the eastern Congo in 1964, and regularly partook in their political meetings in Uvira. Jean Kayitare mobilized a battalion of Rwandan exiles to fight on the Simbas' behalf.

By 1967, the Burundian government had begun to increasingly restrict the activities of Inyenzi rebels, confiscating weaponry of Rukeba's followers. His son Jean Kayitare was killed in a shootout with the Burundian police around this time. In 1968 Rukeba was arrested on the orders of Burundian President Michel Micombero, after Micombero discovered he was Hutu. Upon being detained he told the authorities that he could place 700 armed men at their disposal in the event of a Hutu rebellion. He was released in 1969 and became a businessman. He was arrested again two years later during Micombero's purge of Tutsi-Banyaruguru and sentenced to death, though this was later reduced to a light sentence. In December 1979, Rukeba and several other ex-Inyenzi rebels were expelled from Burundi after continued diplomatic pressure by Rwanda; he subsequently moved to Kenya.

He later returned to Burundi. In February 2000, soldiers of the Rwandan Patriotic Army (RPA) kidnapped Rukeba from his home and brought him to Rwanda. There, he was tortured into signing a confession of conspiring with other opposition figures, including Joseph Sebarenzi, Innocent Byabagamba, and the singer Sankara, to overthrow the Rwandan government and restore King Kigeli V Ndahindurwa.

== Works cited ==
- Lemarchand, René (1970). Rwanda and Burundi. New York: Praeger Publishers. OCLC 254366212.
- "Les problèmes du Ruanda". Courrier Hebdomadaire du CRISP (in French) (51). Centre de recherche et d'information socio-politiques: 1–23. 1960.
- Reyntjens, Filip (1994). L'Afrique des grands lacs en crise: Rwanda, Burundi, 1988-1994. Paris: Karthala. ISBN 9782811122508.
- Rusagara, Frank K. (2009). Resilience of a Nation. A History of the Military in Rwanda. Kigali: Fountain Publishers. ISBN 978-9970190010.
- Stapleton, Tim (2017). "Refugee-warriors and other people's wars in post-colonial Africa: the experience of Rwandese and South African military exiles (1960–94)". In Falola, Toyin; Mbah, Emmanuel (eds.). Dissent, Protest and Dispute in Africa. New York City: Routledge. pp. 241–259. ISBN 978-1-138-22003-4.
- Weinstein, Warren (1976). Historical Dictionary of Burundi. Metuchen: Scarecrow Press. ISBN 9780810809628.
