= Kabuga =

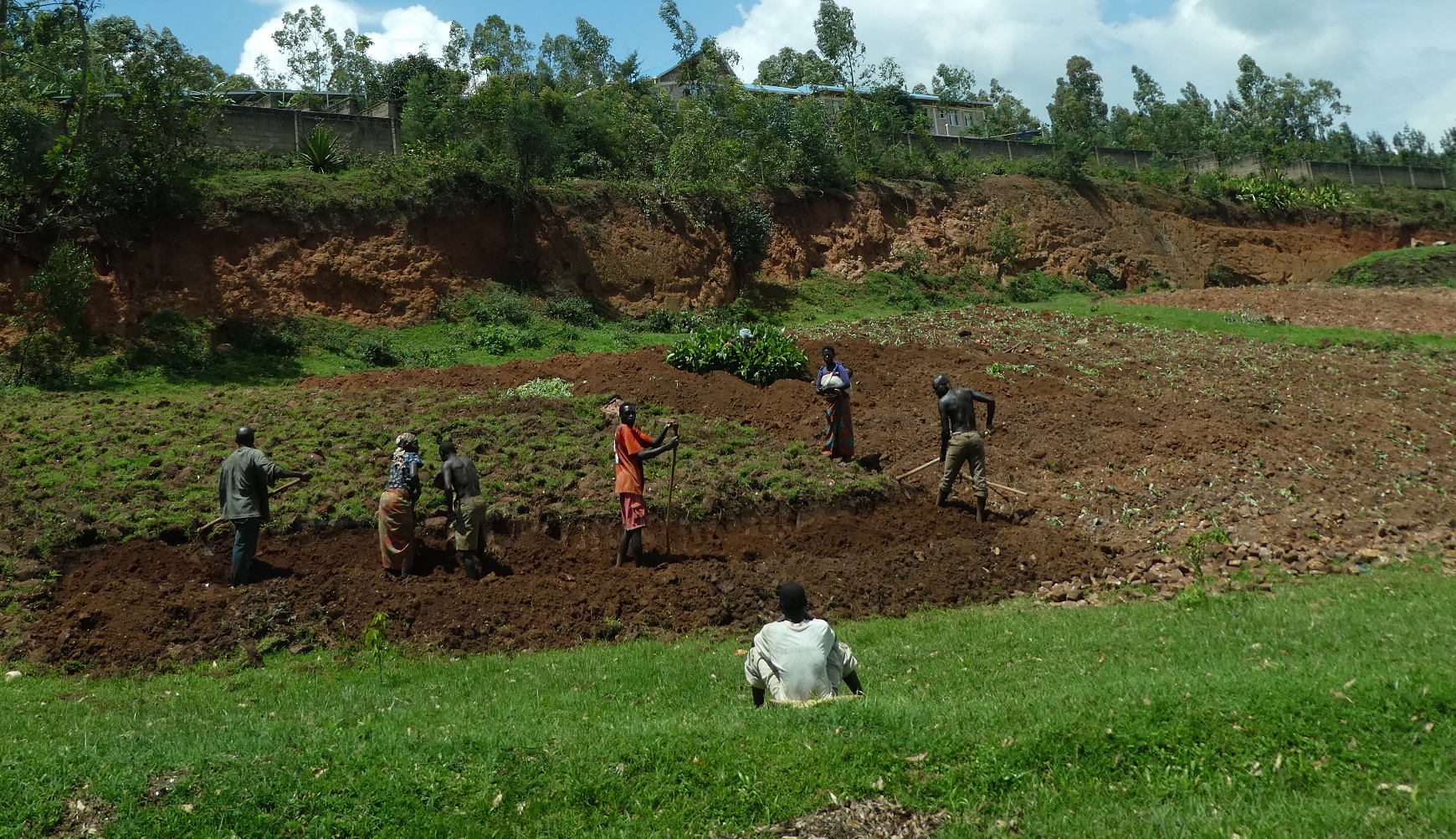
- Farmers in Kabuga

- Location in Rwanda
- Coordinates: 1°58′0″S 30°13′0″E
- Country: Rwanda
- Province: City of Kigali

Population (2012 census)
  - Total: 40,202
- Time zone: UTC+2 (CAT)
  - Summer (DST): UTC+2 (not observed)

Kabuga is a town in the Gasabo and Kicukiro districts, Kigali City, Rwanda. Kabuga is a satellite town of Kigali.

The name Kabuga translates to, "a place where cattle are kept" in Kinyarwanda.

Circa 2008, Oxfam funded the establishment of a medical clinic in Kabuga, substantially reducing the distance pregnant women would have to travel from north-eastern Rwanda.

In April 2014 it was announced by State Minister for Transport, Alexis Nzahabwanimana that the Chinese state-owned China Road and Bridge Corporation had started construction of the 6.3 km Kabuga-Masaka road on 17 April, at a cost of $12 million USD.

It is home to a Divine Mercy shrine, where the African offshoot of the World Apostolic Congress on Mercy was held in 2016.

== Mass graves ==
In April 2018 a mass grave was discovered in Gahoromani locality of Kabuga, estimated to contain at least 3,000 bodies, the grave was the former location of the Conseil National de Development (CND), the Rwandan legislature between 1982 and 1994. The building of the CND was used as a compound to imprison and kill Tutsi, and others targeted by the Rwandan Armed Forces, like moderate Hutu, during the Rwandan civil war as part of the Rwandan genocide. Some clothing found with the human remains was able to be used to identify some victims. Another mass grave was found nearby at Kariyeri locality. A total of four mas graves were found in April 2018.

A further two mass graves were discovered by early May 2018, underneath residential houses in Kabeza locality, containing up to 2,000 more bodies, the graves were difficult to exhume with bodies buried up to 25 metres deep. Locals stated the graves had been prepared as early as 1992 in preparation for the Rwandan genocide. A third mass grave was found close by.

By December 2018, 41 mass graves had been tracked down in Kabuga with 30,000 bodies exhumed, another five graves were found underneath houses which had to be demolished to unearth the bodies, all of which from all 46 mass graves were temporarily sent to Nyanza memorial site to await proper burial.
