= National Intelligence and Security Service (Rwanda) =

Rwandan security agency

- Types: government organization
- Country: Rwanda

The National Intelligence and Security Agency is a Rwandan security and intelligence agency created in 1994 by the Republic of Rwanda following the Rwandan genocide.

== Creation ==
The National Intelligence and Security Agency (NISS) of Rwanda was created in 1994 by the Rwandan Patriotic Front after it took power following the genocide against the Tutsi in 1994.

== Aims ==
The initial aim of NISS was to monitor dissidents supportive of the previous government and suspected perpetrators of the 1994 genocide against the Tutsi. By around 2019, NISS had both internal and external security aims and a role in monitoring immigration.

== Presence ==
As of 2024, in addition to its presence in Rwanda, NISS was present in Eastern Africa, Belgium and the United States.

== Human rights violations ==
In 2011, according to Amnesty International and the Rwandan League for the Promotion and Defense of Human Rights, NISS was responsible for forced disappearances.
