= Rwandese National Union =

Rwandese National Union Union nationale rwandaise
- Abbreviation: UNAR
- Founder: François Rukeba
- Founded: 3 September 1959
- Dissolved: December 1963 (in Rwanda)
- Headquarters: Nyamirambo
- Ideology: Conservatism; Monarchism

The Rwandese National Union (French: Union nationale rwandaise, UNAR) was a conservative, pro-monarchy political party in Rwanda.

== History ==
=== Founding and early activities ===
Union Nationale Rwandaise (Rwandese National Union), or UNAR, was a conservative Rwandan political party. Founded on 3 September 1959, by François Rukeba, and strongly supported by King Kigeri V. At the time, Rwanda was still under Belgian administration, and UNAR was the leading monarchist party. It called for immediate independence under a hereditary Tutsi constitutional monarchy. Michel Rwagasana became its secretary general.

The party boycotted the 1960 local elections, but participated in the 1961 parliamentary elections, receiving 17% of the vote, winning 7 of the 44 seats in the Legislative Assembly. Its rival PARMEHUTU won the majority in the assembly. In February 1962 the United Nations brokered a compromise, the New York Accord, in attempt to ensure Rwandan politics remained inclusive. The agreement called for PARMEHUTU under Grégoire Kayibanda to form a coalition government with UNAR, guaranteeing the latter two ministerial portfolios in the government. UNAR subsequently joined a coalition government with the victorious PARMEHUTU, and was given the cabinet posts responsible for cattle and public health.

=== Split, armed conflict, and demise ===
However, sections of UNAR disagreed with the compromise of New York. The accord thus split UNAR into an accommodationist faction committed to working through the coalition, and a restorationist faction intent on using armed force to attack the new government. The restorationist faction organized itself as "UNAR extérieure" in exile, seeking to restore the Rwandan monarchy. On 17 May 1962 Michel Rwagasana, a leader of UNAR's accommodationist faction, declared before the Legislative Assembly that UNAR was committed to working with the Rwandan government. The restorationists were deeply angered by this statement and it resulted in a total fracture in the party between those who remained in Rwanda and those in exile.

On 21 December 1963 Rwandan Tutsi exiles from Burundi attacked a military camp in Gako, Bugesera. They then advanced on Kigali before being stopped and defeated by the Rwandan National Guard. The Rwandan regime subsequently moved to purge moderate Hutu politicians and UNAR members. Pierre Claver Karyabwite, vice president of the UNAR youth wing, was tipped off by a local official that UNAR's leadership was to be executed. He drove to Nyamirambo, where UNAR was headquartered and where Rwagasana and party president Joseph Rutsindintwarane lived to warn them of the danger. According to Karyabwite, the two refused to flee. On 23 December the UNAR leaders and moderates were detained and taken to Ruhengeri. Over the course of the night they were tortured and early the following morning they were brought to Nyamagumba hill and executed under the supervision of a Belgian officer, Major Turpin. After the purge, UNAR effectively ceased to exist inside Rwanda. In 1965, Rwanda became a one-party state under Parmehutu.

Elements of the UNAR's armed wing continued to carry out attacks until 1967. However, the exiled UNAR never recovered from the failure of the 1963 invasion, instead further descending into infighting. According to Frank Rusagara, the "UNAR was virtually dead" due to intense factionalism by 1965/66. At this point, splinter groups of the UNAR included the Front de Libération Rwandaise (FLR) under Gabriel Sebeza, the Movement Populaire Rwandais (MPR) under Joseph Mudandi; the Jeunesse Nationaliste Kigeri V led by Léopold Nkurikiye; the Congrès de la Jeunesse Rwandaise (COJER) under Kanobayire; and the Jeunesse de l'UNAR (JUNAR) headed by François Rukeba and his son Jean Kayitare.

== Works cited ==
- Cooper, Tom; Fontanellaz, Adrien (2015). The Rwandan Patriotic Front. Solihull: Helion & Company. ISBN 9781910294567.
- Lemarchand, René (1970). Rwanda and Burundi. New York: Praeger Publishers. OCLC 254366212.
- Mamdani, Mahmood (2002). When Victims Become Killers: Colonialism, Nativism, and the Genocide in Rwanda (reprint ed.). Princeton: Princeton University Press. ISBN 9780691102801.
- Mamdani, Mahmood (2020). When Victims Become Killers: Colonialism, Nativism, and the Genocide in Rwanda (revised ed.). Princeton: Princeton University Press. ISBN 9780691193830.
- Mushemeza, Elijah Dickens (2007). The Politics and Empowerment of Banyarwanda Refugees in Uganda, 1959-2001. Kampala: Fountain Publishers. ISBN 9789970027194.
- Rusagara, Frank K. (2009). Resilience of a Nation. A History of the Military in Rwanda. Kigali: Fountain Publishers. ISBN 978-9970190010.
