= Joseph Sebarenzi =

Rwandan politician

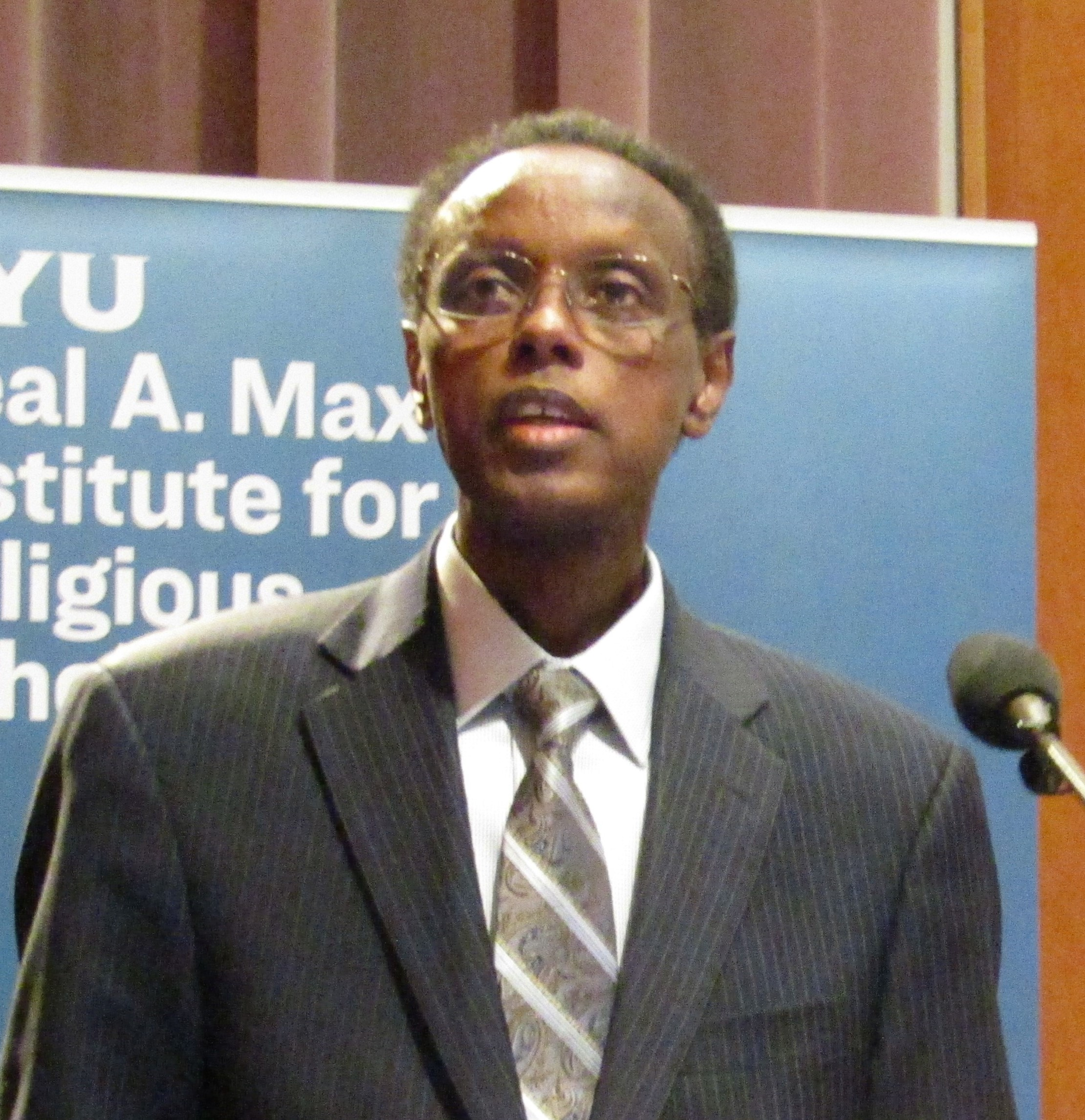
Joseph Sebarenzi in 2018

Joseph Sebarenzi is the former President of the Parliament of Rwanda (1997–2000). He was born in Rwanda in 1963 during the civil war between the Hutu and Tutsi ethnic groups. Before his election to the Rwandan Parliament, Sebarenzi worked as an executive for national and international nonprofit organizations in the Democratic Republic of Congo, Burundi and Rwanda.

During the Rwandan genocide in 1994, Joseph lost his parents and many family members. The tragedies his country endured contribute to his being an advocate for peace and reconciliation.

In 2000, he resigned Parliament and fled Rwanda because he feared assassination. He had emerged as an independent politician who denounced abuses and enhancing the independence and role of the Parliament, particularly with regard to oversight of government action. This commitment to good government won him approval among ordinary people, Hutu as well as Tutsi.

He fled to the United States where he has taught the Conflict Transformation Across Cultures (CONTACT) program at the SIT Graduate Institute since 2003.

Sebarenzi earned his doctorate in International Human Rights Law from the National University of Ireland in Europe, a master's degree in International and Intercultural Management from SIT Graduate Institute in the United States, and a bachelor's degree in sociology from the University of Lubumbashi in the Democratic Republic of Congo. He holds an Honorary Doctorate in Law from Marlboro College in the United States.

Sebarenzi's memoir God Sleeps in Rwanda: A Journey of Transformation was published in New York in 2009 by Simon & Schuster. The memoir combines recollections of his survival of civil wars and genocide in Rwanda, his professional career including his years in politics, and insights about conflict prevention and reconciliation.

In 1989, he married Liberata Kayitasire with whom he has two sons (Respect and Pacifique) and three daughters (Esther, Nicole, and Sandrine).

Through his public speaking and involvement in peacebuilding activities, Sebarenzi uses his experience in resisting revenge and embracing forgiveness to inspire others. He speaks about reconciliation, forgiveness, and conflict resolution at colleges, universities, high schools, and events in the United States and Canada. He is fluent in French, English, Kinyarwandan, and Swahili.
