= Ngara =

- Town
- Location in Tanzania
- Coordinates: 02°30′44″S 030°39′21″E
- Country: Tanzania
- Region: Kagera Region
- District: Ngara District
- Time zone: UTC+3 (EAT)
- UFI: -2571660
- Climate: Cwb

Ngara is a small town in Ngara District, Kagera Region, in Tanzania, East Africa.

Ngara town is small with an estimated population of 8,000 to 10,000 people. The international community is small with the Anglican Church of Tanzania, Diocese of Kagera, and four NGOs employing a handful of expatriate staff. Occasionally, there are also visiting staff, consultants and missionaries.

Market day in Ngara town is Saturday. Vendors come from surrounding villages to sell their seasonal produce. During the week, the market is open, but the availability of produce is more limited. Most basic items are available. In season, fruits and vegetables include tomatoes, carrots, eggplant, spinach, green peppers, pineapple, papaya, mango and oranges. Major staple food crops such as maize, bananas, rice, potatoes, beans and milled products such as wheat flour and sugar are readily obtainable in Ngara.

Ngara is also a location in Kenya, in the County of Nairobi.

== See also ==
- Rusumo, Rwanda
