= Frank Rusagara =

Rwandan military officer and political prisoner (1955–2025)

- Born: 1955; Ruanda-Urundi
- Died: March 2025 (aged 69–70); Kigali, Rwanda

Frank Rusagara (1955–2025) was a Rwandan military officer and political prisoner. He was arrested and charged with inciting insurrection and tarnishing the government’s image. Initially sentenced to 20 years imprisonment, the Court of Appeal in Kigali reduced his sentence while upholding his conviction in 2019.

== Background ==
Rusagara held multiple senior positions in the Rwanda Defense Force. These include secretary general of the Defence Ministry and military attaché in the Rwandan High Commission in the United Kingdom. In 2013, he returned to Rwanda and was forced into retirement, along with 78 other military officers.

== 2014 Arrest and Sentence ==
Frank Rusagara was arrested on August 18, 2014. It was claimed by the prosecution that Rusagara had criticized President Paul Kagame, had made complimentary remarks about the Rwanda National Congress (an exiled opposition group), and had called the country a “police state” and a “banana republic.”

On January 5, 2016, he was tried jointly in the Kanombe Military High Court with his brother-in-law Colonel Tom Byabagamba, the former head of the Presidential Guard unit, as well as his driver, retired Sergeant François Kabayiza. On March 31, 2016, the court found Rusagara guilty of all charges against him and sentenced him to 20 years imprisonment.

In December 2019, the Court of Appeal in Kigali upheld his conviction while reducing his sentence to 15 years. He will be released in 2029. During the appeal, he told the court that he was subject to solitary confinement and close surveillance by cameras.

Rusagara’s arrest was part of a series of arrests against former members of Rwanda’s ruling party, the Rwandan Patriotic Front, who have been critical of the government.

== International Response ==
In July 2017, human rights focused non-profit Freedom Now submitted a petition to the UN Working Group on Arbitrary Detention on behalf of Rusagara, Byabagamba, and Kabayiza. In December 2017, the Working Group determined that their detention was arbitrary and violated international. In February 2018, the Rwandan government denied the allegations and claimed it was not aware of the UN Working Group’s communications.

In November 2017, Amnesty International submitted a report to the African Commission on Human and Peoples' Rights which stated that "judges have failed to adequately address allegations of torture during interrogation” in the trial of Rusagara.

On December 4, 2018, Kate Barth, then Legal Director at Freedom Now, highlighted the case while testifying before the U.S. House of Representatives’ Tom Lantos Human Rights Commission. As well, Freedom Now submitted a report detailing the case to the Office of the United Nations High Commissioner for Human Rights. This report was delivered on March 19, 2020 in advance of Rwanda’s Universal Period Review conducted by the UN in 2021.

Lewis Mudge, Central Africa Director of Human Rights Watch, condemned the arrest and stated: "Serious allegations of torture and witness tampering emerged during the flawed trial in 2016. The court of appeals had an opportunity to investigate these allegations and hold those responsible to account, but instead they doubled down on the decision to stamp out criticism of government policy and action.”

On November 4, 2019, six British legislators sent a letter to President Paul Kagame which conveyed concern over the ongoing detention of Rusagara and Byabagamba. They stated: "We commend Rwanda’s progress over the last three decades, particularly the strides it has made in creating a more inclusive society that has drawn in marginalized populations. However, we are troubled that Rwanda has imposed disproportionate sentences on individuals who are suffering from serious health issues in poor prison conditions,”. In response, Rwanda justice minister Johnston Busingye stated "It would be inappropriate for the Executive to comment on any pending case, seek to influence the outcome or intervene as proposed in your letter,”.

== Death ==
Frank Rusagara died in March 2025, after several years in prison, He was serving a 20-year prison sentence at the time of his death.

== See also ==
- Human rights in Rwanda
- Rwandan genocide
- Rwandan Civil War
- Rwanda National Congress
- Paul Kagame
