= Ministry of Gender and Family Promotion (Rwanda) =

Government ministry of Rwanda

- Emblem of Rwanda

Ministry overview
- Formed: 1992
- Jurisdiction: Government of Rwanda
- Headquarters: Kigali
- Minister responsible: Consolée Uwimana, Minister of Gender and Family Promotion
- Ministry executive: Mireille Batamuliza, Permanent Secretary
- Website: www.migeprof.gov.rw

The Ministry of Gender and Family Promotion (MIGEPROF) is a ministry of the Government of Rwanda. It is in charge of gender equality, family promotion and the protection of children's rights.

Since June 2024, the Minister of Gender and Family Promotion has been Consolée Uwimana.

== History ==
The ministry was created in 1992. At that time, it was called the Ministry in charge of Family and Women Promotion (MIFAPROFE).

In 1997, the ministry also received social affairs. It became the Ministry of Gender, Family and Social Affairs (MIGEFASO). In 1999, it was renamed the Ministry of Gender and Women Promotion (MIGEPROF). It focused on gender equality and the empowerment of women.

In 2005, it took its current name. It was placed under the Office of the Prime Minister. In 2013, it became autonomous again.

== Mandate ==
MIGEPROF coordinates national policies on gender equality and family promotion. It also coordinates policies on the empowerment of women and the protection of children's rights. It works with other government institutions, development partners, non-governmental organisations and the private sector.

The objectives of the ministry include the eradication of gender-based violence. They also include strengthening family unity and positive parenting.

== Leadership ==
On 21 October 2018, Espérance Nyirasafari handed over the ministry to Solina Nyirahabimana.

On 26 February 2020, Jeannette Bayisenge became minister. She replaced Nyirahabimana.

In August 2023, Bayisenge was moved to the Ministry of Public Service and Labour. Valentine Uwamariya, until then Minister of Education, replaced her.

On 12 June 2024, Consolée Uwimana was appointed minister. Uwamariya was moved to the Ministry of Environment. In 2026, Uwimana is still the minister.

Mireille Batamuliza has been Permanent Secretary of the ministry since November 2021.

== See also ==
- Gender equality in Rwanda
- Women in Rwanda
- Cabinet of Rwanda
