= Ministry of Public Service and Labour (Rwanda) =

Government ministry of Rwanda

- Minisiteri y'Abakozi ba Leta n'Umurimo
- Emblem of Rwanda

Ministry overview
- Jurisdiction: Government of Rwanda
- Headquarters: KG 7 Avenue, Kacyiru, Kigali
- Minister responsible: Judith Uwizeye, Minister of Public Service and Labour
- Ministry executive: Clément Kabiligi, Permanent Secretary
- Website: www.mifotra.gov.rw

The Ministry of Public Service and Labour (MIFOTRA) is a ministry of the Government of Rwanda. It is in charge of the public service and of labour.

The ministry aims at public institutions that deliver good services. It also aims at decent employment for Rwandans. Since June 2026, the Minister of Public Service and Labour has been Judith Uwizeye.

== Mandate ==
The mission of MIFOTRA is to give public institutions effective structures and competent staff. This helps them to deliver services at an affordable cost. The ministry also aims at a fair workplace that meets international health and social security standards. This supports job creation.

The vision of MIFOTRA is an efficient public administration that serves citizens well. It is also a country with good jobs and a competitive workforce.

The headquarters are on KG 7 Avenue in Kacyiru. The Permanent Secretary, Clément Kabiligi, has been in office since September 2025.

The main responsibilities of MIFOTRA are:

- drafting, disseminating and coordinating policies, strategies and programmes;
- drafting laws on the public service;
- building the capacity of institutions and staff;
- monitoring and evaluating policies on the management of public servants;
- supervising the institutions under its authority;
- mobilising resources for public institutions and the labour sector.

== History ==
Judith Uwizeye was minister from July 2014 to September 2017. On 4 September 2017, she handed over the ministry to Fanfan Rwanyindo Kayirangwa.

Jeannette Bayisenge was appointed minister on 23 August 2023. She took over from Rwanyindo Kayirangwa on 28 August 2023.

On 14 June 2024, Bayisenge handed over the ministry to Jeanne d'Arc Mujawamariya. On 25 July 2024, Mujawamariya was dismissed from her post.

In August 2024, Christine Nkulikiyinka replaced her. Before that, Nkulikiyinka was chief executive of the Rwanda Cooperation Initiative.

On 10 June 2026, Judith Uwizeye became minister again. She replaced Nkulikiyinka, who was appointed Ambassador of Rwanda to Spain. Before that, Uwizeye was Minister in the Office of the President.

== Ministers ==
- Judith Uwizeye (July 2014 – September 2017)
- Fanfan Rwanyindo Kayirangwa (September 2017 – August 2023)
- Jeannette Bayisenge (August 2023 – June 2024)
- Jeanne d'Arc Mujawamariya (June 2024 – July 2024)
- Christine Nkulikiyinka (August 2024 – June 2026)
- Judith Uwizeye (since June 2026, second term)

== See also ==
- Cabinet of Rwanda
