= Ministry of Youth and Arts (Rwanda) =

Government ministry of Rwanda

- Emblem of Rwanda

Ministry overview
- Preceding ministry: Ministry of Youth and Culture
- Jurisdiction: Government of Rwanda
- Headquarters: Kigali
- Ministers responsible: Jean Nepo Abdallah Utumatwishima, Minister of Youth and Arts; Sandrine Umutoni, Minister of State
- Ministry executive: Parfait Ishungure, Permanent Secretary
- Website: www.moya.gov.rw

The Ministry of Youth and Arts (MoYA) is a ministry of the Government of Rwanda. It is in charge of promoting youth and the arts.

The ministry helps young people to develop economically and socially. The Minister of Youth and Arts is Jean Nepo Abdallah Utumatwishima.

== Mandate ==
The mission of the ministry is to create an environment for the social and economic empowerment of young people. It also aims to promote and develop the arts.

Its main responsibilities are:

- developing, implementing and evaluating national policies, laws and programmes on youth and the arts;
- building the capacity of institutions and staff in the sector;
- supporting the organisations of young people and artists;
- encouraging young people and artists to take part in government programmes;
- coordinating the activities of government bodies and partners;
- promoting exchanges of young people and artists at national, regional and international level.

The ministry has three directorates: youth economic empowerment, arts promotion, and youth mobilisation and social empowerment. It oversees the National Youth Council (NYC), the AGUKA programme and YouthConnekt Rwanda.

== History ==
Before 2023, the ministry was called the Ministry of Youth and Culture. Rosemary Mbabazi had led it since 2017.

In March 2023, Jean Nepo Abdallah Utumatwishima was appointed Minister of Youth. On 31 March 2023, Mbabazi handed over the ministry to him. On the same day, culture was transferred to the Ministry of National Unity and Civic Engagement (MINUBUMWE).

Sandrine Umutoni has been Minister of State since 22 August 2023. Before that, she was Director General of the Imbuto Foundation. On 15 July 2026, Parfait Ishungure was appointed Permanent Secretary of the ministry.

== See also ==
- Youth in Rwanda
- Culture of Rwanda
- Music of Rwanda
- Cabinet of Rwanda
