= Ministry of ICT and Innovation (Rwanda) =

Government ministry of Rwanda

- Emblem of Rwanda

Ministry overview
- Jurisdiction: Government of Rwanda
- Headquarters: Kigali
- Ministers responsible: Paula Ingabire, Minister of ICT and Innovation; Yves Iradukunda, Minister of State
- Website: www.minict.gov.rw

The Ministry of ICT and Innovation (MINICT) is a ministry of the Government of Rwanda. It is in charge of information and communications technology, communications and innovation.

Since October 2018, the Minister of ICT and Innovation has been Paula Ingabire.

== Mandate ==
The mission of MINICT is to develop and coordinate national policies and programmes on ICT, communications and innovation. These programmes aim at economic growth and poverty reduction. They also aim at empowering citizens.

== Leadership ==
On 22 October 2018, Jean de Dieu Rurangirwa handed over the ministry to Paula Ingabire. In 2026, Ingabire is still the minister.

Yves Iradukunda is Minister of State in MINICT. Before that, he was Permanent Secretary of the ministry from 2020 to 2025.

== See also ==
- Telecommunications in Rwanda
- Kigali Innovation City
- Cabinet of Rwanda
