= Ministry of Environment (Rwanda) =

Government ministry of Rwanda

- Emblem of Rwanda

Ministry overview
- Jurisdiction: Government of Rwanda
- Headquarters: Kigali
- Minister responsible: Bernadette Arakwiye, Minister of Environment
- Website: www.environment.gov.rw

The Ministry of Environment (MoE) is a ministry of the Government of Rwanda. It is in charge of protecting the environment and of the response to climate change.

The ministry is also in charge of the sustainable management of water, land and forests. Since July 2025, the Minister of Environment has been Bernadette Arakwiye.

== Mandate ==
The mission of the Ministry of Environment is to protect and conserve the environment. It also aims to reduce the effects of climate change. It must manage natural resources, such as water, land and forests, sustainably for national development.

The main responsibilities of the ministry are:

- developing policies, strategies, laws and regulations on the environment and climate change;
- monitoring and evaluating the implementation of these policies in all sectors;
- guiding and supervising the institutions under its authority and local government;
- mobilising resources for environmental protection and climate change adaptation and mitigation.

== History ==
In August 2017, the new government had a Ministry of Environment, led by Vincent Biruta. It also had a Ministry of Lands and Forestry, led by Francine Tumushime.

== Affiliated agencies ==
The following agencies implement the policies of the Ministry of Environment:

- Rwanda Environment Management Authority (REMA);
- Rwanda Meteorology Agency (Meteo Rwanda);
- National Land Authority (NLA);
- Rwanda Forestry Authority (RFA);
- Rwanda Water Resources Board (RWB);
- Rwanda Green Fund.

== Ministers ==
Vincent Biruta led the Ministry of Environment for five years. On 14 November 2019, he handed it over to Jeanne d'Arc Mujawamariya. On 12 June 2024, Mujawamariya was appointed Minister of Public Service and Labour.

In June 2024, Valentine Uwamariya was moved to the Ministry of Environment. Before that, she was Minister of Gender and Family Promotion.

On 24 July 2025, Bernadette Arakwiye replaced Uwamariya. Before that, Arakwiye led land restoration programmes in Africa at the World Resources Institute (WRI).

== See also ==
- Geography of Rwanda
- Umuganda
- Cabinet of Rwanda
