= Ministry of Disaster Management and Refugee Affairs =

Government ministry of Rwanda

Ministry in charge of Emergency Management
- Emblem of Rwanda

Agency overview
- Formed: 2018
- Preceding agency: Ministry of Disaster Management and Refugee Affairs (MIDIMAR)
- Jurisdiction: Government of Rwanda
- Headquarters: Pension Plaza, KN 3 Road, Kigali
- Minister responsible: Albert Murasira, Minister in charge of Emergency Management
- Agency executive: Aristarque Ngoga, Permanent Secretary
- Website: www.minema.gov.rw

The Ministry in charge of Emergency Management (MINEMA) is the ministry of the Government of Rwanda in charge of disaster management and refugee affairs. Until 2018, it was called the Ministry of Disaster Management and Refugee Affairs (MIDIMAR; Kinyarwanda: Minisiteri y'Imicungire y'Ibiza n'Impunzi; French: Ministère de la Gestion des Catastrophes et des Réfugiés).

The ministry prepares the country for disasters and responds to emergencies. It also manages the refugees hosted in Rwanda. Since August 2023, the minister has been Albert Murasira.

== History ==
The Ministry of Disaster Management and Refugee Affairs (MIDIMAR) was in place by 2010. It published documents in French and Kinyarwanda. In October 2018, a new cabinet was formed. The disaster management and refugee affairs ministry was then placed into a new Ministry of Emergency Management. Its head office, once in the Blue Star House in Kacyiru, is now in Pension Plaza, in central Kigali.

== Role ==
The ministry leads disaster management and refugee affairs policies. It coordinates and directs them. It also coordinates humanitarian assistance in emergencies. Its vision is "to build a disaster resilient nation and ensure effective management of refugee affairs".

Rwanda hosted about 135,000 refugees and other people of concern in August 2024. About 61% were Congolese and 38% were Burundian. Some evacuees from Libya are hosted at the Gashora Emergency Transit Mechanism.

== Ministers ==
- Marcel Gatsinzi (April 2010 – February 2013)
- Séraphine Mukantabana (February 2013 – August 2017)
- Jeanne d'Arc Debonheur (August 2017 – October 2018)
- Germaine Kamayirese (October 2018 – February 2020)
- Marie-Solange Kayisire (March 2020 – August 2023)
- Albert Murasira (since August 2023)
