= Office of the Prime Minister (Rwanda) =

Rwandan government office

- Primature
- Emblem of Rwanda

Agency overview
- Jurisdiction: Government of Rwanda
- Headquarters: Kigali
- Ministers responsible: Justin Nsengiyumva, Prime Minister; Ines Mpambara, Minister in the Office of the Prime Minister
- Agency executive: Michelle Byusa, Permanent Secretary
- Website: www.primature.gov.rw

The Office of the Prime Minister (Primature) is a body of the Government of Rwanda. It is led by the Prime Minister of Rwanda. It coordinates the work of the government.

Since July 2025, the Prime Minister has been Justin Nsengiyumva.

== Mandate ==
The Office of the Prime Minister coordinates government action. It also monitors how government policies and programmes are implemented.

The Prime Minister leads the work of the government. He follows the guidelines of the President of the Republic. He prepares government programmes with the other members of the Cabinet. He also carries out other duties given by the Constitution and other laws.

In 2005, the Ministry of Gender and Family Promotion was placed under the Office of the Prime Minister.

== Leadership ==
On 25 July 2025, Justin Nsengiyumva was sworn in as Prime Minister. He succeeded Édouard Ngirente.

Ines Mpambara has been Minister in the Office of the Prime Minister since 26 February 2020. She ensures that the Cabinet process runs effectively.

Michelle Byusa is the Permanent Secretary of the Office.

== See also ==
- Prime Minister of Rwanda
- Cabinet of Rwanda
