= Ministry of Local Government (Rwanda) =

Government ministry of Rwanda

- Minisiteri y'Ubutegetsi bw'Igihugu
- Emblem of Rwanda

Ministry overview
- Jurisdiction: Government of Rwanda
- Headquarters: KG 7 Avenue, Kigali
- Minister responsible: Dominique Habimana, Minister of Local Government
- Deputy Minister responsible: Marie-Solange Kayisire, Minister of State for Local Government
- Ministry executive: Bob Gakire, Permanent Secretary
- Website: www.minaloc.gov.rw

The Ministry of Local Government (MINALOC) is the ministry of the Government of Rwanda in charge of good governance and territorial administration. It coordinates the programmes of the local governments, such as the provinces and districts.

The ministry is based in Kigali. Since July 2025, the minister has been Dominique Habimana.

== Mission ==
The ministry coordinates good governance and territorial administration programmes. These programmes aim at the economic, social and political development of the country. Its tasks were set by Prime Minister's Order No. 107/03 of 15 October 2020. The ministry develops policies and legal frameworks. It builds the capacity of local governments and monitors their programmes. It also oversees the state organs placed under its supervision.

== Organisation ==
The headquarters are on KG 7 Avenue in Kigali, east of the Ministry of Education. The minister is assisted by a Minister of State for Local Government. Since August 2023, this post has been held by Marie-Solange Kayisire. The Permanent Secretary, Bob Gakire, has led the technical and administrative work since January 2024.

== Ministers ==
- Francis Kaboneka (2014–2018)
- Anastase Shyaka (October 2018 – March 2021)
- Jean-Marie Vianney Gatabazi (March 2021 – November 2022)
- Jean-Claude Musabyimana (November 2022 – 2024)
- Patrice Mugenzi (2024 – July 2025)
- Dominique Habimana (since July 2025)

== See also ==
- Politics of Rwanda
- Cabinet of Rwanda
- Decentralization
