= Ingabire =

Ingabire is a surname that is mainly found in Rwanda. Notable people with the surname include:

- Assumpta Ingabire, Rwandan politician
- Charles Ingabire (died 2011), Rwandan journalist and editor
- Diane Ingabire (born 2001), Rwandan road racing cyclist
- Marie Immaculée Ingabire (c.1962–2025), Rwandan feminist and human rights activist
- Pascaline Ingabire (born 1995), Rwandan filmmaker, film producer and actress
- Paula Ingabire (born 1983), Rwandan technology professional and politician

== See also ==
- Jo Ingabire Moys (born 1990), Rwandan-British writer, actress and director
- Victoire Ingabire Umuhoza (born 1968), Rwandan politician
