= Fanfan Rwanyindo Kayirangwa =

Rwandan politician

- Born: Rwanda
- Citizenship: Rwandan
- Education: National University of Rwanda (Bachelor of Laws); Wits University (Master of Laws)
- Occupation: Politician
- Years active: 2000–present
- Known for: Politics
- Title: Cabinet Minister of Public Service and Labour in the Cabinet of Rwanda

Fanfan Rwanyindo Kayirangwa is a Rwandan politician who has been the Cabinet Minister of Public Service and Labour in the Rwandan cabinet, since 31 August 2017.

== Background and education ==
She holds a Bachelor of Laws, obtained in 1997, from the National University of Rwanda. She also holds a Master of Laws, awarded in 2010, by the University of the Witwatersrand, in Johannesburg, South Africa.

== Career ==
Prior to 2004, Rwanyindo Kayirangwa worked in the financial services industry. From 1998 until 2004, she served as the legal adviser and credit officer of Commercial Bank of Rwanda, which today trades as I&M Bank Rwanda Limited.

From 2004 until 2017, she worked in the judiciary of Rwanda. In 2004, she was appointed a Justice of the High Court of Rwanda. In 2008 she was moved to the Commercial High Court. She was appointed Vice-President of the Commercial High Court of Rwanda in October 2013.

In the cabinet reshuffle of 31 August 2017, Fanfan Rwanyindo Kayirangwa was appointed the new cabinet minister of public service and labour, replacing Judith Uwizeye, who took up the position of Minister in the Office of the President.

== Other considerations ==
She is a member of "Autism Speaks", a non-government organization (NGO). She is also one of the founders of "Private Sector Association against HIV/AIDS", another NGO.

== See also ==
- Francine Tumushime
- Judith Uwizeye
- Rosemary Mbabazi
