= Solina Nyirahabimana =

Rwandan diplomat and politician

- Born: Rwanda
- Citizenship: Rwandan
- Occupations: Diplomat, politician
- Years active: 2000–present
- Known for: Politics
- Title: Cabinet Minister of Gender and Family Promotion in the Cabinet of Rwanda

Solina Nyirahabimana is a Rwandan diplomat and politician who has served as the Minister of State in Charge of Constitution and Legal Affairs since 2020. She was previously appointed cabinet Minister of Gender and Family Promotion in the Rwandan cabinet on 18 October 2018.

Nyirahabimana served as Rwanda's Ambassador to Switzerland, before she was recalled in 2013.

She represented Rwanda at the third summit of Women7 which occurred at Unesco in Paris in May 2019.

== See also ==
- Germaine Kamayirese
- Espérance Nyirasafari
- Marie-Solange Kayisire
