= Uwera =

Uwera is a surname. Notable people with this surname include:

- Claudine Uwera, Rwandan politician and economist
- Sarah Uwera (born 1996), Rwandan cricketer
- Ley Uwera (born 1989), Congolese photojournalist
- Pélagie Uwera (born 1974), Rwandan politician
- Alexia Mupende Uwera, Rwandan model
