= Jeanne d'Arc Debonheur =

Rwandan lawyer and politician

- Born: 19 April 1978 (age 48); Rwanda
- Citizenship: Rwandan
- Education: National University of Rwanda (Bachelor of Laws) (Master of Laws in Business law)
- Occupations: Lawyer and politician
- Years active: 2008–present
- Known for: Politics
- Title: Cabinet Minister of Refugees and Disaster Management in the Cabinet of Rwanda

Jeanne d'Arc Debonheur (born 19 April 1978) is a Rwandan lawyer and politician who has been the Rwandan Cabinet Minister of Refugees and Disaster Management since 30 August 2017.

== Background and education ==
She was born on 19 April 1978, and attended local Rwandan schools for her pre-university education. In 2012 she obtained a Master of Laws degree from the National University of Rwanda.

== Career ==
Debonheur started her career in 2008, working as a Court Registrar in the Commercial Court, based in Musanze and Nyarugenge, serving in that capacity until 2011.

From 2011 until 2012 she worked as Legal Drafter and Advisor in the Chamber of Deputies of the bicameral Rwanda Parliament. For a period of three months, from January 2013 to 23 April 2013, she served as the Legal Officer in "Rwanda Environment Management Authority" (REMA).

From 24 April 2013, Debonheur worked as a specialist in legislative drafting and as legal advisor to the Rwanda Senate, serving in that capacity until 29 August 2017.

On 31 August 2017, she was sworn in as the Rwanda Minister for Disaster Management and Refugee Affairs.

== Personal life ==
Jeanne d'Arc Debonheur is a married mother of three children.

== See also ==
- Francine Tumushime
- Rosemary Mbabazi
