= Gerayo Amahoro =

Gerayo Amahoro is the title of a Rwandan road safety campaign of 50 weeks It was launched on May 13, 2019 by Rwandan National Police. Gerayo amahoro campaign have been used by Government of Rwanda through Traffic Police as way of teaching road users safeties and precautions they have to follow in order to avoid and reduces accidents that caused by ignorance.

Teaching procedures has been taken place through many different ways in Rwanda like on Social Medias, Audio and Video advertisements, Religious community, outdoor advertisement, in schools, and many places. Gerayo Amahoro had halted on its 46th week when COVID-19 broke out in the country and it has resumed on June 2, 2020

== Joiners of campaign ==
religious groups like Islam, Catholic Church, Protestant church, Adventist and others were the first to join this campaign through teaching about it in church meeting

== Impacts of Gerayo Amahoro ==
Gerayo amaho campaign has achieved more in arrive safe, according to official police data, road crash rates in Rwanda have decreased 17% since the start of Gerayo Amahoro (which means “arrive safely”).

However more road accident has been decreased as the as data shows of 17 percent decreased as it saves life of many people die in road crash.
