= Anastase Shyaka =

Rwanda academic and politician

Ambassador of the Republic of Rwanda to the Republic of Poland Ambassador to Rwanda
- In office 2021–present
- President: Paul Kagame
- Preceded by: —

Minister of Local Government
- In office 2018–2021
- President: Paul Kagame

Personal details
- Citizenship: Rwandan
- Spouse: Beata M. Shyaka
- Children: 3
- Education: PhD
- Alma mater: Warsaw University of Technology, University of Gdańsk
- Occupation: Diplomat
- Awards: Fulbright Scholar-in-Residence (2007)

Professor Anastase Shyaka, is a Rwandan academic, politician, and diplomat. He currently serves as the Ambassador of the Republic of Rwanda to the Republic of Poland. Prior to that, he was the Minister of Local Government (MINALOC) from 2018 to 2021. He was also the founding CEO of the Rwanda Governance Board (RGB) from 2011 to 2018. Before that, he held various administrative, academic, and research positions in Universities in Rwanda and abroad. During his career, Shyaka has served on multiple national, regional, and international boards—especially those related to governance, leadership, and education.

== Career ==
In 2021, Anastase Shyaka was appointed as the first Ambassador of the Republic of Rwanda to the Republic of Poland. In his role as Ambassador, Shyaka has been instrumental in building bilateral relations with Poland, especially in revamping economic and academic diplomacy. Prior to this, he served as the Minister of Local Government (MINALOC) in the Cabinet of Rwanda since October 2018. At MINALOC, Shyaka was tasked with driving the implementation of government policies in four main areas: territorial administration, decentralization and local government empowerment, community development, and social affairs and protection.

From 2008, Anastase Shyaka was the Executive Secretary of the Rwandan Governance Advisory Council until it was merged with other institutions to become the Rwandan Governance Board (RGB) in 2011. As its founding chief executive officer, Shyaka developed the annual Rwanda Governance Scorecard and directed its first 5 editions.

Following the completion of his academic education in Poland, Anastase settled in present-day Huye (former Butare) as a Professor of Political Science. He served as Deputy Director (2002-2005) and then Director (2005-2008) of Center for Conflict Management (CCM) at the University of Rwanda (formerly the National University of Rwanda). Anastase Shyaka's research focused on two main areas: identity questions in Rwanda, and conflicts and se in the Great Lakes Region. Among his many contributions at CCM, he spearheaded the establishment of two Masters programs: Genocide Studies and Prevention, and Peace and Development Studies. Additionally, he was the first Rwandan recipient of a Fulbright Scholar in Residence at George Mason University and Northern Virginia Community College in the 2006-2007 academic year.

== Leadership and Governance ==
In addition to his professional engagements, Anastase Shyaka has held various leadership roles in his career. As the chairperson of the National Consultative Committee (NCC), an institution created to fast track the East African Community (EAC) Political Federation, Shyaka led the national committee through critical engagements with stakeholders and communities around the country. These engagements revolved around fundamental issues of Rwanda's integration into the EAC and raising awareness about the regional group that Rwanda had just joined. Between 2009-2012, he served as the Coordinator of the Joint Governance Assessment (JGA)—a framework for dialogue around governance issues from political, economic, and social spectrums—and spearheaded discussions between the Government of Rwanda and its bilateral and multilateral development partners from donor countries and various institutions. The JGA aimed at creating constructive discussions and data-based convergence on governance in Rwanda. As noted in the 2008-2009 annual review, the JGA was initiated with three fundamental objectives:

i. To develop a common (Government and Donors) understanding of governance issues in Rwanda;

ii. To reduce transaction costs by consolidating different donor governance assessment activities; and

iii. To provide an objective, evidence-based assessment that reflects Rwanda's specific governance history and its current context and realities; and to develop a framework for future programming, monitoring and evaluation of governance trends.

Between 2013-2016, he served as a Board Member of the UNDP Global Center for Public Service Excellence (based in Singapore). While CEO at RGB, Shyaka spearheaded government of Rwanda's program on homegrown solutions and evidence-based governance. He particularly championed people-centered governance, accountability, and quality service delivery to all. This was evidenced by the tools that were developed by the Rwandan Governance Board during his tenure. Among them, he created the Rwandan Governance Scorecard (RGS), a "comprehensive governance assessment tool constructed from data based on over 200 questions, which are structured based on a set of 8 indicators, 35 sub-indicators and 143 sub-sub indicators". As noted in the first RGS report from 2012, its main objectives aimed to:

- To generate credible and reliable data on governance issues for national and international stakeholders;
- To serve as a practical tool that will drive policy reform through the identification of areas for improvement and actionable recommendations;
- To contribute to current knowledge about governance in Rwanda.

The annual publication aimed to spur accountability and service delivery across all governing agencies in the country and gauge the state of governance in Rwanda.

Shyaka was a founding Member of the Section on African Public Administration of the American Society of Public Administration (ASPA), and subsequent Advisory Member. Shyaka has served on various boards of Rwandan Universities.

== Early life ==
Originally from the region of Mutara, Shyaka was born and raised in Rwempasha, Nyagatare District. His attended Le Petitt Seminaire Rwesero, where he pursued the Latin-Bio-Chem option. Upon graduation from high school, he continued his education in Polish Universities. He received a Masters in Chemical Technology from Warsaw University of Technology (WUT), and a Master HEC en Sciences de Gestions Approffondies from WUT in collaboration with HEC Paris. He holds a PhD in Political Science from the University of Gdańsk in Poland.

Throughout his youth and adulthood, Shyaka has been passionate about poetry, composing and publishing several poems, including Amarenga y'urwejo mu marembo y'urweya, a collection published in 1998. He was featured in a recent collection of Rwandan poets, Inganzo Nyarwanda: Imivugo y'Abahanzi Nyarwanda by Bangambiki Habyarimana.

== Selected publications ==
Anastase has written several books and dozens of articles, primarily on identity, governance, and politics in Rwanda and the Great Lakes Region.

- Shyaka, A., Haque, S., & Mudacumura, G. (Eds.). (2017). Democratizing Public Governance in Developing Nations (1st ed.). Routledge. https://doi.org/10.4324/9781315671925
- Shyaka, A. (2003). Conflits en Afrique des Grands Lacs et Esquisse de leur Résolution. Wydawnictwo Akademickie Dialog Sp. Z o.o. https://wydawnictwodialog.pl/conflits-en-afrique-des-grands-lacs-et-esquisse-de-leur-r%C3%A9solution,80,823.html
- Shyaka, A. (2006). The Rwandan Conflict: Origin, Development, Exit Strategies. The National Unity and Reconciliation Commission https://repositories.lib.utexas.edu/server/api/core/bitstreams/8f5561a2-c08c-4bb4-9a94-e1838eb14baa/content
- Shyaka, A., Rutembesa, F., & National University of Rwanda. (2004). Afrique des grands lacs : sécurité et paix durable. https://search.worldcat.org/fr/title/afrique-des-grands-lacs-securite-et-paix-durable/oclc/60359771?referer=di&ht=edition
- Gasarasi, C., Shyaka, A. (2009), Performance of Past and Present Political Parties in Rwanda, Palotti Press.
- Shyaka, A. (2008a). Understanding the conflicts in the Great Lakes Region: An overview. Journal of African Conflicts and Peace Studies, 1(1), 5–12. https://doi.org/10.5038/2325-484x.1.1.1
- Shyaka, A., Rutembesa, F., Semujanga, J., & National University of Rwanda. (2003). Rwanda : identité et citoyenneté. Editions de l’Université nationale du Rwanda, Butare, Rwanda.
- Shyaka, A. (1998), Amarenga y'urwejo mu marembo y'urweya, Oficyna Poligraficzna, Lidzbark Warminski, Pologne.

== See also ==
- Parliament of Rwanda
- Prime Minister of Rwanda
