= Germaine Kamayirese =

Rwandan engineer and politician

- Born: 5 August 1981 (age 45); Nyarugenge District, Rwanda
- Citizenship: Rwandan
- Education: Kigali Institute of Science and Technology (Bachelor of Electricalmechanical Engineering); Coventry University (Masters of Communications Management)
- Occupations: Engineer and politician
- Years active: 2010–present
- Known for: Politics
- Title: Minister of State for Infrastructure in the Cabinet of Rwanda

Germaine Kamayirese is an engineer and politician in Rwanda, who served as the Minister of Emergency Management and Refugee Affairs in the Rwandan cabinet, from 18 October 2018 until she was dropped from cabinet on 27 February 2020.

Before that, from 24 July 2014 until 18 October 2018, she served as the Minister of State for Infrastructure responsible for Energy, Water and Sanitation.

== Background and education ==
She was born in Nyarugenge District on 5 August 1981. From 2000 until 2005, she studied at the Kigali Institute of Science and Technology (KIST), which today is the College of Science and Technology (Rwanda), a constituent college of the University of Rwanda. She holds a Bachelor of Electricalmechanical Engineering, awarded by KIST in 2005. She also holds a Masters of Communications Management, awarded jointly in 2010 by KIST and Coventry University, in the United Kingdom.

== Career ==
From 2008 until 2011, Germaine Kamayirese served as a network specialist at "Rwanda Utilities Regulatory Agency" (RURA). From 2012 until 2014, she served as a network specialist at "Tigo-Rwanda". From 2010 until 2011 Kamayirese served as an advisor at the "Institute of Engineering Architecture Rwanda". As of September 2017, she was a member of "Rwanda Women Engineers Association" (RWEA).

In her capacity as the State Minister responsible for energy, water and sanitation in the Ministry of Infrastructure, she was in charge of executing the country's national strategy and policy of power production, transmission, distribution and trading within Rwanda and with foreign energy entities. She was also responsible for the provision of reliable, safe and sustainable water supply and sanitation services throughout Rwanda.

In a cabinet reshuffle on 18 October 2018, Ms Kamayirese was named the new Minister of Emergency Management and Refugee Affairs.

== Family ==
Germaine Kamayirese is a mother of four children.

== Other considerations ==
In December 2014, Forbes Magazine named her among "The 20 Youngest Power Women In Africa 2014".

== See also ==
- Judith Uwizeye
- Gérardine Mukeshimana
- Yvonne Khamati
