= Jean Claude Musabyimana =

Rwandan Politician

Jean Claude Musabyimana is a Rwandan politician among the Cabinet of Rwanda who had served as the Minister of Local Government since November 2022.

== Career ==
Jean had worked as the permanent secretary of the Ministry of Agriculture and Animal Resources.

He was Secretary in the Ministry of Lands and Forests (MINILAF).

He has more than 15 years of experience as a teacher and as a local representative. From 2016 to 2017 he served as the governor of the Northern Province.

He became the mayor of Musanze district.

He was the deputy mayor of Musanze District in charge of development and economy and before(2002-2009) he was a Lecturer in the Higher Institute of Agriculture and animal sciences(ISAE BUsogo).

== Appointment as a cabinet member ==
On 10 November 2022, Jean was appointed the Minister of Local Government in Rwanda making him a cabinet member of the country.
