= Alengot Oromait =

Ugandan politician

- Born: January 1, 1993 (age 33); Katakwi, Uganda
- Citizenship: Uganda
- Education: Uganda Advanced Certificate of Education; Uganda National Examinations Board; Kampala, Uganda
- Occupation: Member of Parliament
- Years active: 2012 — present
- Known for: Politics
- Title: Member of parliament for Usuk County; Katakwi District

Proscovia Alengot Oromait (born 1 January 1993) is a former Ugandan university student and politician. She served as the elected member of parliament (MP) for Usuk County, Katakwi District from 2011 to 2016. At age 19, she was the youngest member of parliament in Uganda, and on the African continent.

== Background ==
She was born in Katakwi District on 1 January 1993. Her father, Michael Oromait, served as the MP for the same parliamentary seat before his death on 21 July 2012.

== Education ==
She completed her high school (S6) at St. Kalemba Senior Secondary School in Kayunga District in December 2011. She was admitted to Uganda Christian University in Mukono, beginning August 2012.

== Work experience ==
After her father's death, Alengot Oromait decided to contest the National Resistance Movement primary elections to replace her father, who had served as an Independent. She won the primary and in the general elections in September 2012, she won with 54.2% of the vote. She is expected to juggle her undergraduate studies with her parliamentary duties for the next three years at the minimum.

== Personal details ==
Unmarried, Alengot Oromait belongs to the National Resistance Movement, the ruling political party in Uganda. She deals with such issues as the environment, education, health policy and gender issues. One of her mentors is Jessica Alupo, the then Minister of Education and Member of Parliament (MP) for the Katakwi District Women's Representative.

== See also ==
- Cabinet of Uganda
- Yvonne Khamati
- Katakwi District
- List of members of the ninth Parliament of Uganda
