= Women in Rwanda =

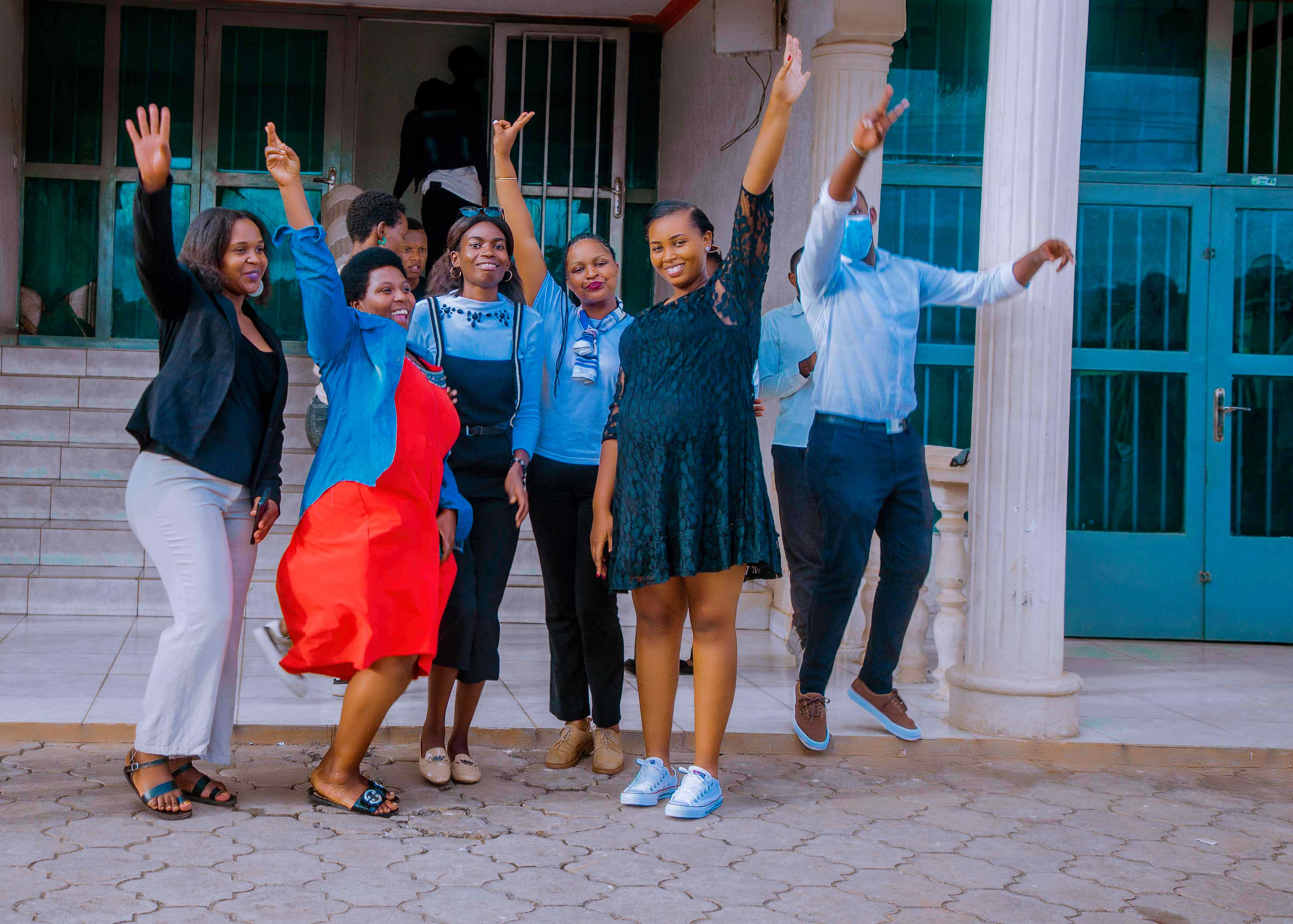
Celebrating International Women's Day

Women in Rwanda have played important roles throughout the country's history, with their social, political, and economic status changing significantly during the pre-colonial, colonial, and post-independence periods. The 1994 Rwandan genocide marked a shift in gender norms, after which women assumed leading roles in reconstruction and political life. Today, Rwanda ranks within the top 5 countries for gender equality according to the Global Gender Gap Report.

== History ==
=== Pre-colonial ===
In the early iron age of Rwanda, women began to serve as agricultural laborers and became involved in smithing activities as gender roles began to solidify.

During the Kingdom of Rwanda, the Mwami's power was transferred from father to son through the clan of the son's mother. The queen mother (umugabekazi) had significant power over the Mwami. In practice, this resembled matrilineal descent: although this was not a standard practice, often times a deceased Mwami would be succeeded by his sororal nephew. The strength of competing female relatives of the Mwami determined the successor.

The social responsibilities of non-royal women varied heavily: despite facing not being able to own cattle or land and mainly handling domestic responsibilities, men and women collaborated on clearing the fields and farming.

=== Colonial ===
The Belgian and German colonization of Rwanda led to previous patriarchal norms being further solidified. During the German colonization of Rwanda, the introduction of a cash economy created opportunities for rural Rwandan men's employment, leaving women short of jobs. European women were also disproportionately favored for administrative jobs, one of the few jobs that were accessible to women. Hence, colonization made agricultural labor significantly more gendered. Women of the Tutsi ethnic group also became more favored by the Belgian government due to the pseudoscientific Hamitic hypothesis, heightening tensions with the Hutu as resentment began to build among them. Tutsi women adopted European lifestyles and began to acquire more governmental power.

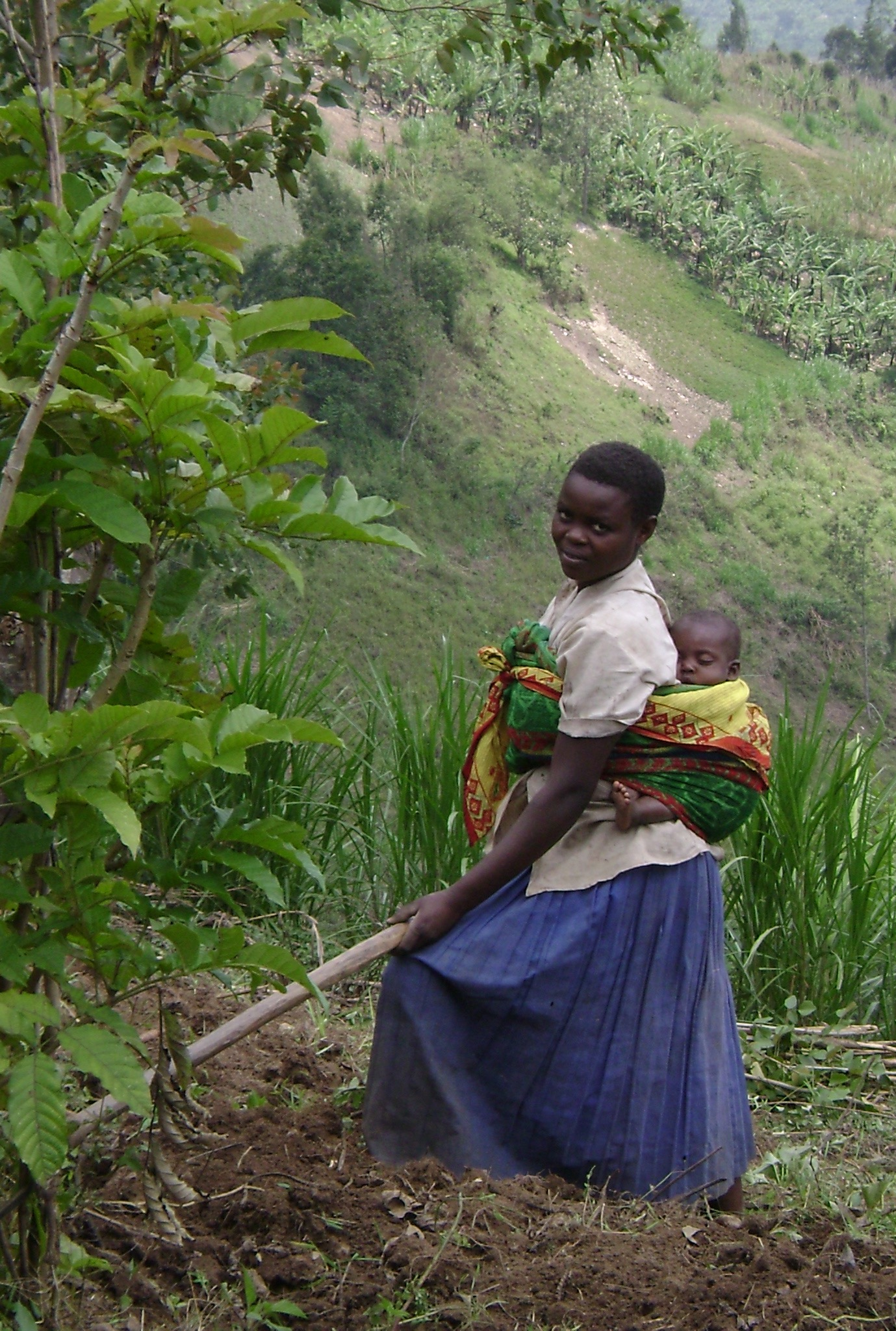
Rwandan woman working in the hills

=== Post-colonial ===
The First Rwandese Republic in 1961 under Grégoire Kayibanda started social initiatives to increase literacy and public health education among rural and uneducated women and provide career assistance to educated women.

In 1973, Juvénal Habyarimana overthrew Kayibanda and started the Second Rwandese Republic, gaining legitimacy through the first lady Agathe Habyarimana's royal bloodline. During the Second Republic, women faced stigma in working because of the public expectation of domestic labor. Until 1992, men were the only legally recognized heads of households.

=== During the genocide ===
During the Rwandan genocide, women typically did not partake in the killings due to stigma against engaging in physical violence. Rather, they contributed to the killings by providing logistical support to the génocidaires, such as by telling them where the victims were hiding. However, some Hutu women also hid Tutsis at great risk to themselves.

Many Tutsi women were subject to sexual violence, rooted in the misogynistic Hutu Ten Commandments which demonized Tutsi women. The Interahamwe were ordered to rape Tutsis, some commanded by Pauline Nyiramasuhuko, who was a woman.

=== After the genocide ===
After conflicts, it is common for gender roles to be temporarily loosened. However, in Rwanda these changes were long-lasting and had lasting effects on the status of women today in the country as well. Due to womens' participation in the conflict, Rwandan women have a prominent role in the nation's the United Nations peacekeeping forces. Since 2003, Rwanda has had the highest rate of womens' participation in parliament in the world.

== Cultural practices ==
Imigongo is an art form traditionally practiced by women made using cow dung.

== Prominent women ==
- Agathe Uwilingiyimana – Prime Minister of Rwanda from 1993 until her assassination
- Pauline Nyiramasuhuko – Former Minister of Family and Women's Development, convicted of genocide
- Aloisea Inyumba – Politician and Minister of Gender and Family Promotion who played a major role in post-genocide reconstruction
- Rose Kabuye – Former military officer in the RPF
- Jeannette Kagame – First Lady of Rwanda
- Diane Shima Rwigara – Businesswoman
- Kanjogera – Queen Mother of the Kingdom of Rwanda

== See also ==
- Rwandan genocide
- Gender equality in Rwanda
