= Francine Tumushime =

Rwandan politician

- Born: Rwanda
- Citizenship: Rwandan
- Occupation: Politician
- Years active: 2008–present
- Known for: Politics
- Title: Minister of Lands and Forestry, Cabinet of Rwanda

Francine Tumushime, is a Rwandan politician who serves as the cabinet minister of Lands and Forestry (Minilaf), since 31 August 2017.

== Background ==
Tumushime is a Rwandan citizen who joined the Rwandan civil service in 2012. Tumushime holds a Master's Degree in Business Administration, with a specialization in ‘Project Management from Maastricht School of Management, in Netherlands. She also has Engineering Degree in Agriculture and "Diplôme de Candidature" in science from the National University of Burundi

Eng. Francine TUMUSHIME speaks Kinyarwanda; French; English and Swahili.

== Career ==
Prior her appointment to the Cabinet, Tumushime served as the Coordinator of World Bank Single Projects Implementation Unit in the Ministry of Agriculture and Animal Resources. She also served as National Coordinator of IFAD funded project in Charge of promoting Rural Small and Micro-Enterprises under The Ministry of Trade and Industry.

For more than 10 years, Eng. Francine Tumushime has worked as well with public and development partners funded projects and programmes in the area of agriculture, natural resources, rural development and social protection among others.

In addition, Eng. Francine Tumushime served on the Boards of Directors of a number of Government Institutions Including Local Administrative Entities Development Agency (LODA), Rwanda Agriculture Board (RAB), Rwanda Cooperative Agency (RCA) and Rwanda Agriculture Development Authority (RADA.

Since 2012, until March 2016, Hon. Francine Tumushime served as the Director General in charge of Community Development and Social Affairs in the Ministry of Local Government(Minaloc). When she left Minaloc on 3 May 2016, she was replaced by Sheikh Hassa Bahame.

On 31 August 2017, she was sworn in as the cabinet minister of lands and forestry. The lands and forestry docket was created out of the ministry of natural resources, in August 2017, making the ministry of environment an independent docket of its own and disbanding the ministry of natural resources.

== See also ==
- Judith Uwizeye
- Rosemary Mbabazi
