= Agaseke =

Woven basket

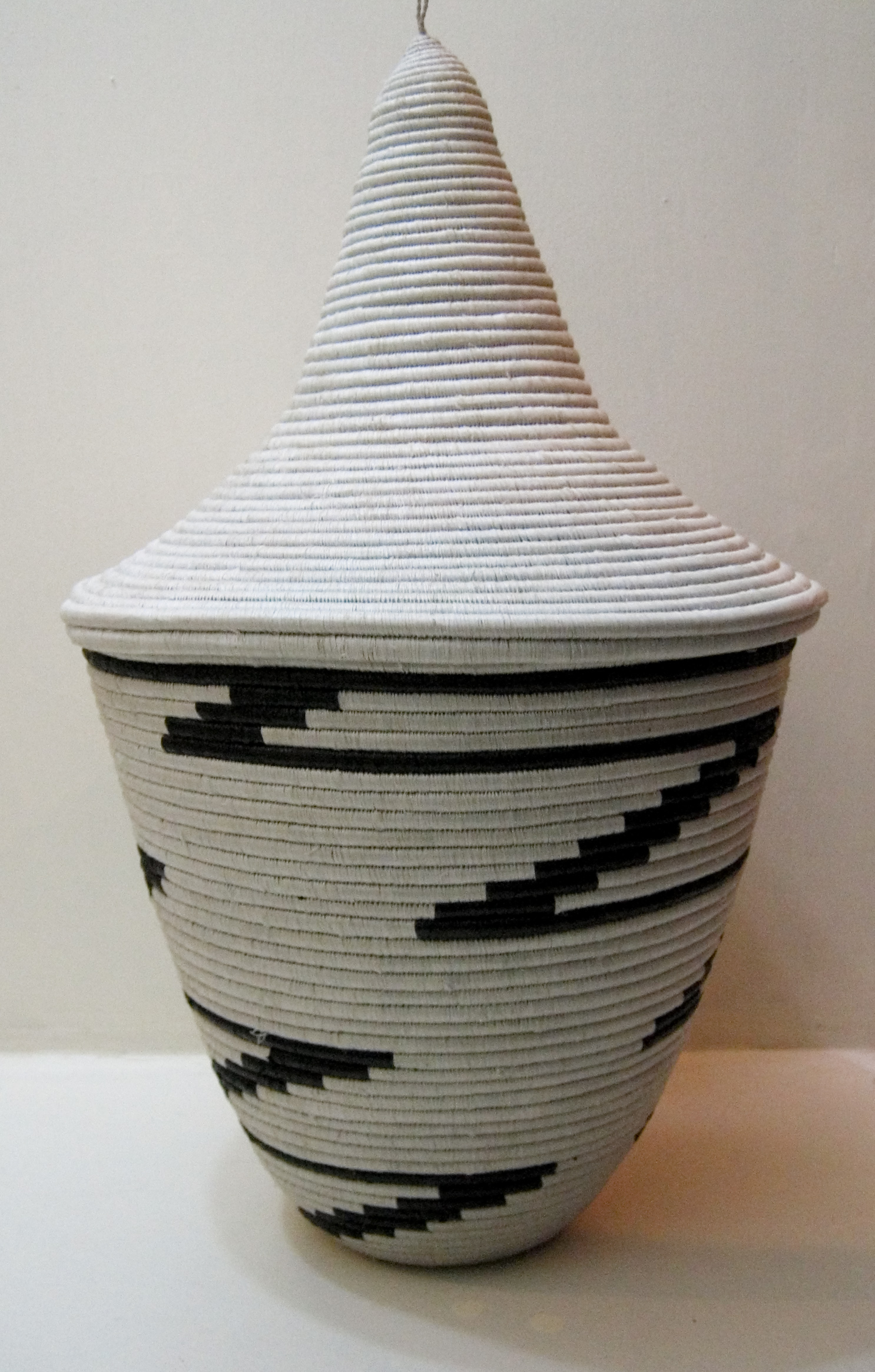
Agaseke

Agaseke is a type of traditional Rwandese woven basket. It is characterized by its flat circular base that is taller than it is wide, with a sloped conical fitted lid. It is traditionally made of native natural fibers in natural off-white colors with naturally-dyed patterns in colors like purple, green, black, yellow, and red. There are numerous patterns that can be displayed on the sides of the agaseke, each with their own significance.

== Etymology ==
The word Agaseke is composed of two parts: aga- which indicates singularity and -seke which indicates the object itself. Agaseke in its plural form is uduseke. An alternative spelling of uduseke as ubuseke is also common.

== Cultural symbolism ==
Rwandese produce many styles of basket, the most notable being the agaseke because of the importance it holds in family life. Uduseke are used to promote positive inter-family relations as they are primarily used to hold food and/or other gifts when going to visit someone or when going to a wedding. Because of this, they are a symbol of peace and goodwill amongst families and friends.

The lidded nature of uduseke also gives the basket a sense of privacy which speaks to the personal connection between the gifter and the receiver. Agaseke can also symbolize protection for the same reason as the tight stitch and weaving pattern gives ample protection of the contents, often dry foods, from outside conditions and pests.

Agaseke also symbolize a strong family and a wife or mother's dedication to her family. Agaseke production is labor-intensive and customarily a women-dominated art form, and so being able to make one well is said to show a dedication to detail and proper upbringing that is rewarded in Rwandan culture. This aspect of symbolism has evolved from a test of ability to a symbol of luck in recent times as an agaseke is commonly gifted by elders to new brides to communicate congratulations and wish her strength and luck.

== Historical and traditional uses ==
In times and areas where trade and barter were/are more common, uduseke were/are traded for other craft necessities and so have long functioned as a part of local economies. They are also used practically in everyday life to store dry-foods and other objects that need to be covered.

As symbols of feminine power, they are common props in women's traditional dances in which dancers present their baskets to the audience in a show of self-confidence and pride.

== Recent uses and importance ==
In addition to historical and traditional uses, uduseke have gained new influence in post-genocide Rwanda and in regional and global commerce.

=== Post-genocide reconciliation ===
After the 1994 genocide, efforts towards reconciliation between survivors and perpetrators of violence was emphasized and the symbol of the agaseke was incorporated into the Rwandan seal and utilized to promote forgiveness in hopes of cultivating healing. Production cooperatives also served as places for survivors, largely women, could meet people and create art together.

=== Cultural export product ===
As a cultural export, uduseke have been sold all over the world and have made Rwandan culture marketable to a wider audience and accessible to Rwandan people in diaspora. They have also been a tool of women's empowerment, as after the genocide, 70% of the population were women and so became the sole breadwinners for their families. Both government sponsored and cooperative agaseke production efforts have had success in the inclusion of women in regional and global economic markets and giving the artists agency over their work.
