= Yvonne Khamati =

Kenyan politician (born c. 1982)

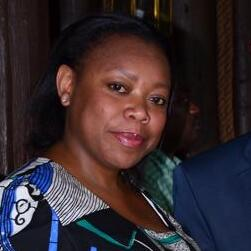
- Born: Yvonne Shibikhwa Khamati; 1982 (age 43–44); Nairobi, Kenya
- Citizenship: Kenyan
- Education: University of Nairobi (Diploma in Sociology & Criminology); United States International University Africa (Diploma in Political Science & International Relations); American World University (Master of Arts in Counselling Psychology)
- Occupations: Politician and ambassador
- Years active: 2007 to present
- Title: C.O.O Afrintel, C.E.O Kenya National Heroes Council, Ambassador, Director Foreign Service, Ministry of Foreign Affairs, Kenya

Yvonne Khamati (born c. 1982), is a Kenyan politician who was nominated to the East African Legislative Assembly as Member of Parliament by Ford Kenya Party (and the Kenya National Assembly) aged 21 and a diplomat who was appointed by President Mwai Kibaki to serve as Ambassador and Deputy Permanent Representative to Ethiopia and African Union at 24. She has served in the past as Chair of the Committee of Permanent Representatives and Rapporteur of the African Diplomatic Corp, in the Kenyan Ministry of Foreign Affairs. She has worked in various missions. As of November 2018, Khamati served as the deputy ambassador at the Kenyan embassy in Mogadishu, capital city of Somalia. She is currently CEO of the Kenya National Heroes Council, a parastatal under the Ministry of Sports, Culture and Heritage

== Background and education ==
Yvonne Shibikhwa Khamati was born in Nairobi, Kenya, circa 1982. After attending elementary school in Kenya, she joined Stretford Grammar School, in Manchester, United Kingdom, where she completed her O-Level studies in 1998. In 1999, she returned to Kenya and joined Peponi High School, where she completed her A-Level schooling in 2001.

Between 2001 and 2009, she studied at various institutions of higher education including the University of Nairobi, the United States International University Africa and the online American World University. She earned a Diploma in Sociology & Criminology, a Diploma in Political Science & International Relations, A Bachelor of Business Administration degree from San Juan de La Cruz University (Universidad San Juan de la Cruz) and a Master of Arts (MA) degree in Counselling Psychology. In 2012, she earned a Professional Graduate Diploma in Management from Cambridge Association of Manager's.

== Career ==
In 2001, at the age of 19, she was elected to serve as the Deputy Organizing Secretary of the Forum for the Restoration of Democracy – Kenya (Ford Kenya) political party, a position she kept until 2006. She was later nominated by the party to the East African Legislative Assembly in Arusha making her the youngest MP to be nominated to the house. From August 2003 until March 2006, she was a research fellow at the United Nations Economic Commission for Africa (UNECA), working in the Sustainable Development and Food Policy Division. From April 2003 until January 2008, she was Appointed by Nigeria's President Obasanjo to serve as the Chairperson of the Youth Technical Committee for NEPAD.

In January 2008, her diplomatic career began when she was appointed by President Mwai Kibaki of Kenya as Ambassador and DPR to Ethiopia and the African Union, she later became Deputy Permanent Representative of Kenya at the United Nations office in Nairobi, Kenya, working in that capacity until September 2012. In 2012, she has transferred to Kenya's Embassy in Mogadishu, Somalia, as the Deputy Ambassador. She has served as Director FS in the Liaison Parliamentary and Senate Directorate at the Foreign Ministry HQ, Chairperson of the Committee of Permanent Representatives of UN HABITAT, Rapporteur of the African Diplomatic Corp and was Director FS in the Directorate of International Conferences and Events at the Foreign Ministry. Ambassador Khamati-Yahaya currently serves as the C.E.O of the Kenya Heroes Council a parastatal under the Ministry of Sport, Culture and Heritage.

== Family ==
She has a daughter Zalika Kalani and a son Kazeem Yahaya. She is married to Nigerian Oxford University trained lawyer Laiwola Yahaya.

== Other considerations ==
In 2002, she was appointed to represent Kenya at the East African Legislative Assembly, in Arusha, Tanzania. At age 22 years, she was the youngest person to have been appointed to the East African Parliament. In December 2014, she was named one of "The 20 Youngest Power Women In Africa 2014", by Forbes.

In 2017, she was named as top 100 top Africans under 40 by MIPAD (Most Influential people of African Descent). She also runs the YK Foundation, which works on empowering women and the girl child in rural areas providing scholarships, sanitary towels, jigger treatment and feeding programs.

== See also ==
- Iddah Asin
- Germaine Kamayirese
- Onofiok Luke
- Alengot Oromait
