= Politics of Rwanda =

Politics of Rwanda Politiki y'u Rwanda (Kinyarwanda) Politique en Rwanda (French) Siasa ya Rwanda (Swahili)
- Seal of Rwanda
- Polity type: De facto: one-party state Nominally unitary dominant-party semi-presidential constitutional republic
- Constitution: Constitution of Rwanda

Legislative branch
- Name: Parliament
- Type: Bicameral
- Upper house
- Name: Senate
- Presiding officer: Augustin Iyamuremye, Speaker of the Senate
- Lower house
- Name: Chamber of Deputies
- Presiding officer: Donatille Mukabalisa, Speaker of the Chamber of Deputies

Executive branch
- Head of state
- Title: President of Rwanda
- Currently: Paul Kagame
- Appointer: Direct popular vote
- Head of government
- Title: Prime Minister
- Currently: Justin Nsengiyumva
- Appointer: President
- Cabinet
- Name: Cabinet of Rwanda
- Current cabinet: Kagame government
- Leader: President
- Deputy leader: Prime Minister
- Appointer: President

Judicial branch
- Supreme Court of Rwanda
- Chief judge: Faustin Ntezilyayo

The Republic of Rwanda is politically a de facto one-party republic governed by the Rwandan Patriotic Front (RPF) and its leader, Paul Kagame, who was formally elected in 2000, since the RPF played the primary role in ending the 1994 genocide. Although Rwanda is nominally democratic, elections are manipulated in various ways, which include banning opposition parties, arresting or assassinating critics, and electoral fraud.

Rwandan legislation has developed from Belgian and German civil law systems, with the country's customary law taking place in a framework of a semi-presidential republic, whereby the president of Rwanda serves as the head of state, possessing significant executive power, together with the prime minister of Rwanda serving as the constitutional head of government.

Legislative power is vested in both the government and the two chambers of parliament, the Senate and the Chamber of Deputies. On 5 May 1995, the Transitional National Assembly adopted a new constitution that incorporates elements of the 18 June 1991 constitution as well as provisions of the 1993 Arusha Accords and the November 1994 multiparty protocol of understanding.

== National legislature ==
In Rwanda, the Chamber of Deputies is composed of 80 Deputies. Among them, 53 Deputies are elected by direct universal suffrage in secret, from a fixed list of names of candidates proposed by political organizations or independent candidates; 24 women are elected by specific electoral colleges in accordance with the national administrative entities; two Deputies are elected by the National Youth Council; and one Deputy is elected by the National Council of Persons with Disabilities.

As of 2015 the Senate is composed of 26 members. Among them, there are 12 Senators elected by the specific councils in accordance with the administrative entities; 8 Senators appointed by the President of the Republic; 4 Senators designated by the National Forum of Political organizations; one Senator elected among lecturers and researchers of public universities and higher learning institutions; and one Senator elected among lecturers and researchers of private universities and higher learning institutions.

== Historical background ==
After its military victory in July 1994, the Rwandese Patriotic Front organized a coalition government similar to that established by President Juvénal Habyarimana in 1992. Called The Broad Based Government of National Unity, its fundamental law is based on a combination of the constitution, the Arusha accords, and political declarations by the parties. The MRND party was banned.

Political organizing was banned until 2003. The first post-genocide presidential and legislative elections were held in August and September 2003, respectively.

The biggest problems facing the government were the reintegration of more than 2 million refugees returning from as long ago as 1959; the end of the insurgency and counter-insurgency among ex-military and Interahamwe militia and the Rwandan Patriotic Army, which is concentrated in the north and south west; and the shift away from crisis to medium- and long-term development planning. The prison population swelled to more than 100,000 in the 3 years after the war.

The government prohibits any form of discrimination by gender, ethnicity, race, or religion. It has passed laws prohibiting emphasis on Hutu or Tutsi identity in most types of political activity.

== Political-economical focus ==
From 2005 to 2010. the political headcount ratio on national poverty lines decreased by more than 10 percent, while life expectancy increased to approximately 64 years, which is higher than that of similar Sub-Saharan African countries and other low-income countries.

In 2011, Rwanda's CO_{2} emissions totaled 0.1 metric tons per capita, which was significantly lower than those of similar Sub-Saharan African countries as well as other low income countries. Rwanda's school enrollment rate is much higher than that of similar Sub-Saharan African countries, as well as other low-income countries.

As of 2014, Rwanda was still considered a low-income country with a GDP of $7.890 billion, based on U.S. dollars, with a total population of 11.34 million people.

As of 2015, Rwanda had made a shift towards economic improvement, centralizing its foreign exchange around coffee and tea production, "helping to reduce poverty and inequality." The World Bank has praised Rwanda's efforts. Kagame has reached out to large companies, such as Costco and Starbucks, which, as of 2015, were the two largest buyers of Rwandan coffee beans.

== Branches ==
=== Executive ===
Main office-holders
Office	Name	Party	Since
President	Paul Kagame	Rwandan Patriotic Front	24 March 2000
Prime Minister	Justin Nsengiyumva	Social Democratic Party	25 July 2025

The President of Rwanda is elected for a five-year term by the people. The Prime Minister and the Council of Ministers are appointed by the president. The president has numerous powers that include creating policy in conjunction with the Cabinet, signing presidential orders, put into effect the prerogative of mercy, negotiating and passing treaties, commanding the armed forces, and declaring war or a state of crisis.

=== Legislative ===
The Parliament (Inteko Ishinga Amategeko or Parlement) has two chambers. The Chamber of Deputies (Umutwe w'Abadepite/Chambre des Députés) has 80 members, 53 of them elected for a five-year term by proportional representation with a 5% threshold, 24 (female members) elected by provincial councils, 2 by the National Youth Council and 1 by the Federation of the Associations of the Disabled. It is the only legislative chamber in the world where women (45) outnumber men (35).

The Senate (Umutwe wa Sena or Sénat) has 26 members elected or appointed for an eight-year term: 12 elected by provincial and sectoral councils, 8 appointed by the president to ensure the representation of historically marginalized communities, 4 by the Forum of political formations and 2 elected by the staff of the universities. Additional former presidents can request to be member of the senate. Rwanda is a one party dominant state with the Rwandan Patriotic Front in power. Opposition parties are allowed, and are represented in Parliament, but are widely considered to have no real chance of gaining power.

=== Judiciary ===
The Supreme Court of Rwanda is the highest judicial power in Rwanda. Together with the High Council of the Judiciary, it is responsible for overseeing Rwanda's courts of lower ordinary jurisdictions and courts of the special jurisdictions. The Supreme Court consists of the Court President, Vice President, and 12 judges.

Established in 2001, the Gacaca Court was established by the National Unity Government to try cases of genocide against the Tutsis.

Moreover, judges are nominated by the president of the republic, after consulting with the Cabinet and the Superior Council of the Judiciary. Afterwards, they must receive the Senate's approval. The court president and vice president are appointed for 8-year nonrenewable terms.

Regarding the legal profession, although the Rwanda Bar Association has been in existence and operational since at least 1997, there has been a lack of clear indications as to how certain demographic groups, such as women, have fared in the legal field.

== Current Presidential Overview ==
The current president of Rwanda is Paul Kagame. The 6th president of Rwanda, he was first elected in 2003. In 2007, the former president, Pasteur Bizimungu, was released from prison on a presidential pardon. Kagame was re-elected in 2010, receiving 93.1 percent of the cast votes. Since taking office, Kagame has raised business, reduced crime and corruption, and attracted many foreign investors.

Additionally, Kagame has not groomed anyone to be his successor, so there is nothing that points to who his successor could or should be.

President Paul Kagame and his Rwandan Patriotic Front are the dominant political forces in Rwanda. There is only one registered opposition party, while many political opponents have fled into exile.

President Kagame received military training in Uganda, Tanzania, and the United States. He was a founding member of current Ugandan President, Yoweri Museveni's rebel army in 1979 and headed its intelligence wing, assisting Museveni in taking power in 1986.

== Politicians ==
=== Key ministers ===
- President: Paul Kagame
- Prime minister: Justin Nsengiyumva
- Agriculture & animal resources: Dr. Ildephonse Musafiri
- Cabinet affairs: Ines Mpambara
- Defence: Juvenal Marizamunda
- Emergency Management: Maj Gen Albert Murasira
- Education: Gaspard Twagirayezu
- Family & gender: Dr Valentine Uwamariya
- Finance & economic planning: Dr. Uzziel Ndagijimana
- Foreign affairs & co-operation: Dr. Vincent Biruta
- Health: Dr. Sabin Nsanzimana
- Infrastructure: Dr. Jimmy Gasore
- Internal security: Alfred Gasana
- Justice/attorney-general: Dr. Emmanuel Ugirashebuja
- Local government: Jean Claude Musabyimana
- Natural resources: Amb. Dr. Jeanne d'Arc Mujawamariya
- President's office: Judith Uwizeye
- Public service & labour: Prof Jeannette Bayisenge
- Sports: Aurore Mimosa Munyangaju
- Minister of Youth : Dr. Utumatwishima Jean Nepo Abdallah
- Trade & industry: Prof. Jean Chrysostome Ngabitsinze
- ICT and Innovation: Paula Ingabire
- Minister of National Unity and Civic Engagement: Dr. Jean-Damascène Bizimana

=== Ministers of State ===
- Minister of State in the Ministry of Local Government in charge of Social Affairs: Assumpta Ingabire
- Minister of State in the Ministry of Justice in Charge of Constitutional and Legal Affairs: Amb. Solina Nyirahabimana
- Minister of State in the Ministry of Finance and Economic Planning in charge of Economic Planning: Dr. Claudine Uwera
- Minister of State in the Ministry of Finance and Economic Planning in Charge of the National Treasury: Richard Tusabe
- Minister of State in the Ministry of Education in charge of Primary and Secondary Education: Gaspard Twagirayezu
- Minister of State in the Ministry of Education in Charge of ICT and TVET Education: Irere Claudette
- Minister of State in the Ministry of Health in charge of Primary Healthcare: Lt Col Dr. Tharcisse Mpunga
- Minister of State in the Ministry of Foreign Affairs and International Cooperation in charge of the East African Community: Prof. Manasseh Nshuti
- Minister of State of the Ministry of Youth and Culture: Sandrine Umutoni
- Minister of State of the Ministry of Agriculture and Animal Resources: Prof. Jean Chrysostome Ngabitsinze

==== Other Cabinet Members ====
- Chief Executive Officer of Rwanda Development Board: Francis Gatare

== Decentralization system ==
Rwanda is composed of 4 provinces and capital city, 30 districts, 416 sectors, 2,148 cells and 14,837 villages. The four provinces, headed by a governor include the Northern, Southern, Eastern and the Western Provinces. The districts, formerly known as communes, are headed by mayors, two vice mayors, and a district council. As of 2006, Kigali has 3 districts, the Northern Province has 5, the Southern Province has 8, and both the Eastern and Western Provinces have 7 districts. Sectors are responsible for implementing and developing programs which deliver services for the social welfare of the population and promote good governance. Sectors are governed by an Executive Secretary and Sector Council. The council includes representatives of cells; members representing persons with disabilities, women, and youth; members representing all primary and secondary schools; members representing health service organizations; and members representing NGOs and cooperative societies. Cells are administrative providers of public services and development. They are governed by an Executive Secretary and Cell Council, whose membership is similar to that of the Sector Council. Villages are governed by a village council, executive committee, and a village head. The village council is composed of all residents above the age of 18. The executive committee are elected members who provide services to the community, such as information and training, social welfare, and security.

== International organization participation ==
Rwanda is member of ACCT, ACP, AfDB, C, CCC, CEEAC, CEPGL, ECA, FAO, G-77, IBRD, ICAO, ICFTU, ICRM, IDA, IFAD, IFC, IFRCS, ILO, IMF, Intelsat, Interpol, IOC, IOM (observer), ITU, NAM, OPCW, UN, UNCTAD, UNESCO, UNIDO, UPU, WCL, WHO, WIPO, WMO, WToO, WTrO

Rwanda joined the Commonwealth of Nations in 2009, making the country one of only two in the Commonwealth without a British colonial past; the other being the former Portuguese colony Mozambique.

== See also ==
- Censorship in Rwanda
- Rwanda asylum plan
