= Christine Nkulikiyinka =

Rwandan ambassador

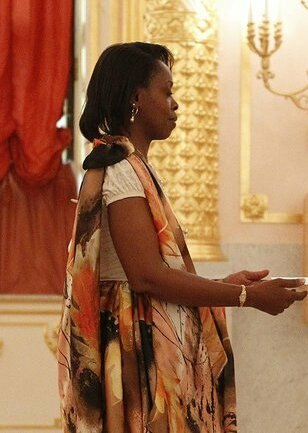
- Born: 1 February 1965 (age 61); Kigali, Rwanda
- Education: Ludwigshafen University of Applied Sciences
- Occupation: CEO

Christine Nkulikiyinka (born 1 February 1965) is a Rwandan politician, diplomat and CEP. She is a member of cabinet of Rwanda, where she serves as the Minister of Public Service and Labor since her appointment on 16 August 2024. She was also Rwanda's ambassador to several countries including Germany, Sweden and Russia. She became the CEO of the Rwanda Cooperation and in 2024 she became the Minister of Public Service and Labour.

== Life ==
Nkulikiyinka was born in Kigali in 1965. She grew up in the Rwandan capital and attended high school there. From 1985 she studied German as a foreign language in Mainz, then business administration at the Ludwigshafen University of Applied Sciences. She speaks French, English, German and Kinyarwanda.

She worked at the Rwandan Embassy in Berlin from 1991 to 2005 during which she was promoted to second embassy counsellor. She returned to Rwanda where she worked in the Rwandan Foreign Ministry in Kigali.

From 2009 to 2015 Christine Nkulikiyinka was her country's ambassador in Berlin, where she was responsible for Germany but also Poland, Romania, Liechtenstein, the Czech Republic, Slovakia and Ukraine. On 14 July 2011 she presented her credentials to the then Russian Prime Minister Dmitry Medvedev and was from that point also the Rwandan Ambassador to Russia, until the Rwandan embassy in Moscow was reopened in August 2013 and Jeanne d'Arc Mujawamariya took over.

In September 2015, Nkulikiyinka became the Rwandan ambassador to Sweden and she also dealt with Norway, Denmark, Finland and Iceland. Iceland has been involved with setting up drilling in Rwanda to establish geothermal power.

In 2022, Nkulikiyinka became the CEO of a Rwanda Cooperation Initiative, which is funded by the government to that markets Rwanda's home-grown initiatives and best practices abroad and improve South–South cooperation.

In August 2024, Nkulikiyinka was appointed Minister of Public Service and Labour. She replaced Jeanne d'Arc Mujawamariya, who was dismissed from the government.
