= Jean-Marie Vianney Gatabazi =

Rwandan politician (born 1968)

- Born: 1968 (age 57–58); Gicumbi, Rwanda
- Occupation: Unknown
- Known for: Rwandan Politics

Jean-Marie Vianney Gatabazi (born 18 August 1968) is a Rwandan politician. He was the former Minister of Rwanda Local Government until November 2022. He served as the governor of the Northern Province of Rwanda from August 2017 to March 2021, having previously served as Member of Parliament for 12 years.

== Early life ==
Gatabazi was born in Mukarange, Gicumbi District, Northern Province, Rwanda. He attended Mulindi Primary School and EAV Kabutare for secondary studies. He holds a BBA in Management from Kigali Institute of Science and Technology and MBA in Strategic Management from Mount Kenya University. He is married with four children.

He did advanced courses in disaster management and mass communication at Tsinghua University in China in 2011 and advanced courses in health promotion at the University of Rwanda in 2011.

== Career ==
1990–1993 Head of Agricultural services of the Former Commune Cyungo and former Commune Kiyombe under DRB II in what is the Northern province today.

He served as head of communication and health promotion in Rwanda Biomedical Center from 2010 to 2013.

Gatabazi has a background in agriculture, and served for 12 years as Member of Parliament for the Rwandan Patriotic Front.
