= Aurore Mimosa Munyangaju =

Rwandan businesswoman and politician

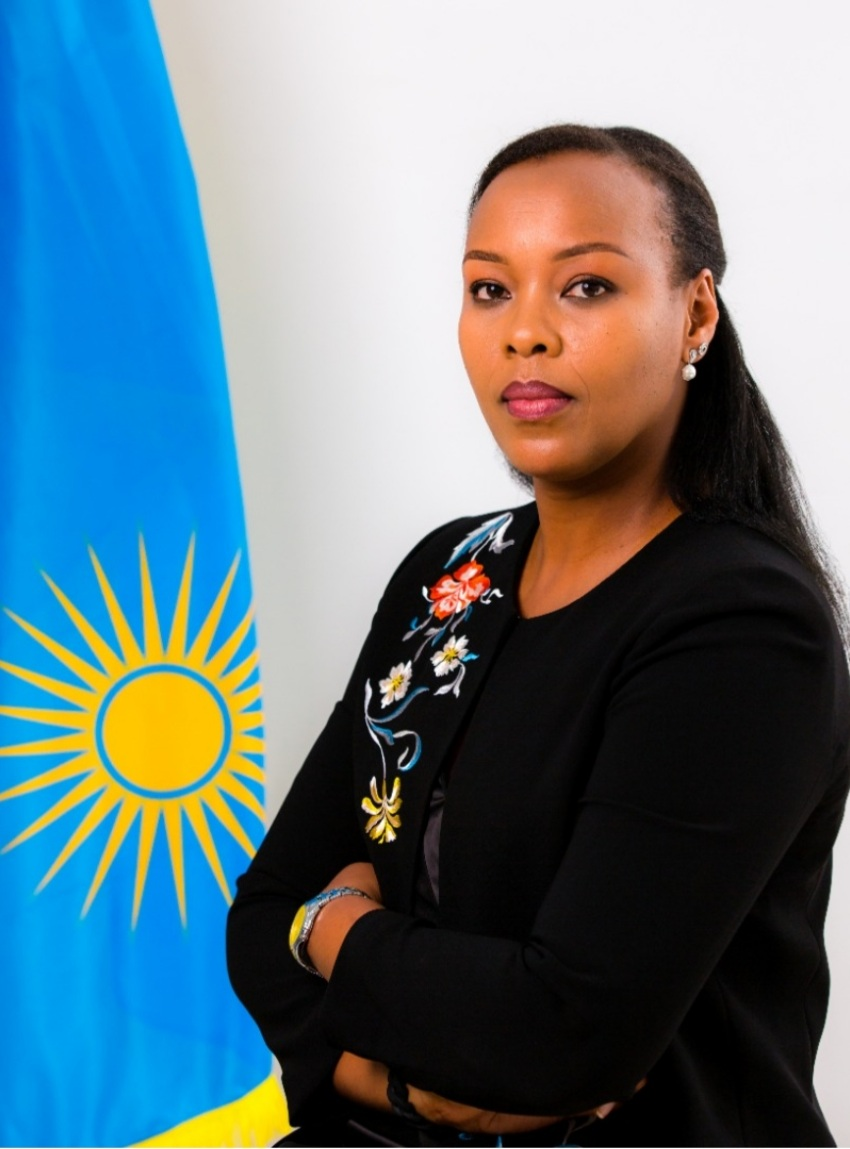
- Born: Rwanda
- Citizenship: Rwandan
- Education: Maastricht School of Management (Master of Business Administration)
- Occupation: Politician
- Years active: 2000–present
- Known for: Business management
- Title: Former Minister of Sports; Cabinet of Rwanda

Aurore Mimosa Munyangaju is a Rwandan businesswoman and politician who served as the Minister of Sports in Rwanda from 5 November 2019 to 2024. As of 2024, she serves as Rwanda’s Ambassador to the Grand Duchy of Luxembourg.

== Early life and education ==
Mimosa holds a certificate in dealing simulation, awarded by ACI-Australia, an affiliate of The Financial Markets Association. She also graduated from Maastricht School of Management, in Maastricht, the Netherlands, with a Master of Business Administration, majoring in Project Management.

== Career ==
Prior to her appointment as Rwanda's Minister of Sports, Mimosa was the chief executive officer of Sonarwa Life Company, a Kigali-based insurance business. Before that, she was the CEO of African Alliance Rwanda. African Alliance is an investment banking group operating in Africa.

She has over a decade of experience in the banking industry especially in treasury management operations, and trade finance and institutional banking. She played a key role in establishing the first Securities Trading Company, as well as the first East Africa Commodity Exchange in Rwanda.

== See also ==
- Cabinet of Rwanda
