= Ley Uwera =

Congolese photojournalist

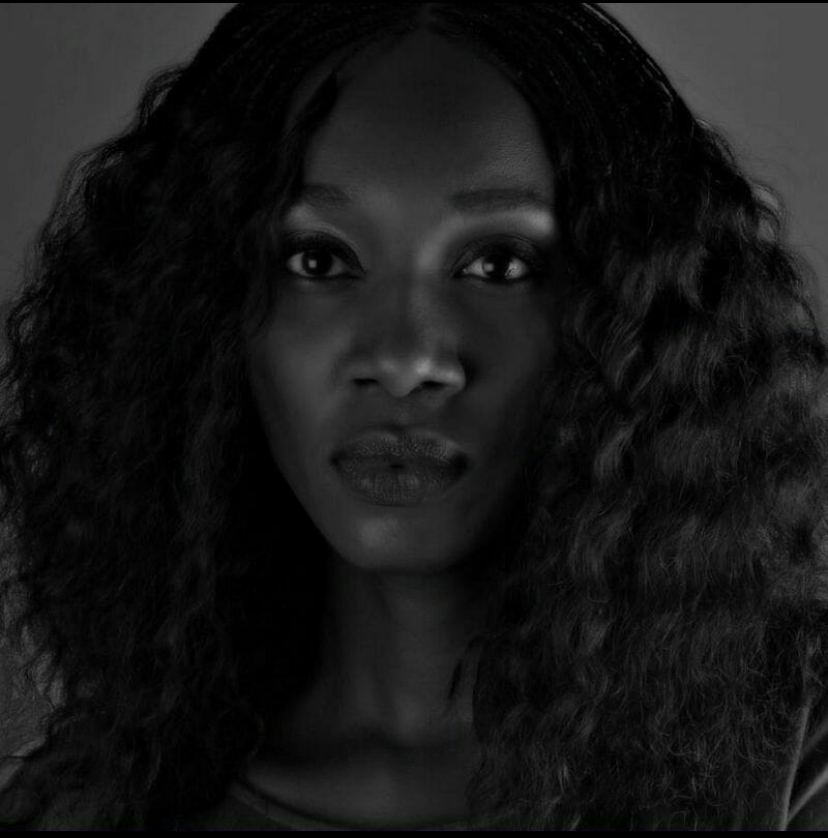
- Born: 1989 (age 36–37); Goma DR Congo
- Occupation: Photojournalist
- Website: leyuwera.com/bio

Ley Uwera (born 9 December 1989) is a Congolese photojournalist. She reports on conflicts and documents the sociocultural evolution of the eastern region of the African Continent, particularly within Congo. Uwera contributes to the Everyday Africa collective and she is a member of the International Women's Media Foundation.

== Early life ==
Ley Uwera was born in Goma, Republic of the Congo on December 9, 1989. Her photography journey began during her teenage years when she acquired her first camera, taking pictures of her family and the beautiful landscapes of Goma. Through her photos, she found a way to connect with people's emotions and tell powerful stories.

== Career ==
She earned a journalism degree from the University of Cepromad. She is a fellow of the IWMF Great Lakes Reporting Initiative in the Central African Republic, and she has worked with a myriad of international outlets including BBC, Le Monde, NPR, The Washington Post, Aljazeera, Global Press Institute and Jeune Afrique. Her photography has been featured in various publications such as The New Humanitarian, Departures, Huck Magazine, The New York Times' "LENS" blog, Upworthy, Vantage, and Vrij Nederland. Additionally, her work has been showcased at exhibitions in Fes, Istanbul. She worked for UNHCR, UNWOMEN, Care, Drugs for Neglected Disease, WFP, ICRC, United Nations, Packard Foundations, and Tear Fund, and has been involved in producing annual reports for Congo Research Group (CRG). Her photography documenting the Eastern Congo conflict was exhibited at the Bayeux Calvados-Normandy award for war correspondents in France in 2023.
