= Youth in Rwanda =

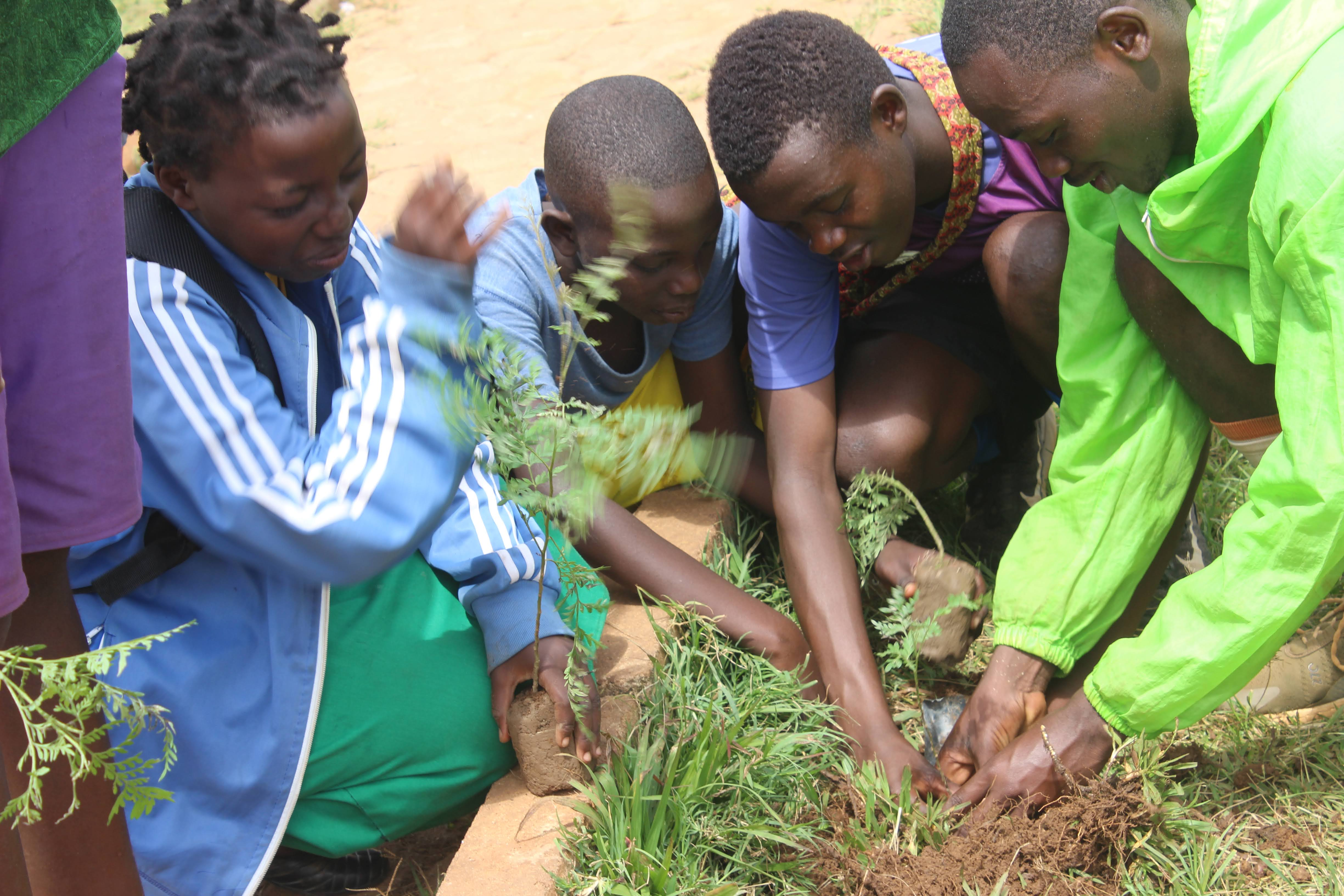
Youth planting trees in Rwanda.

Youth in Rwanda constituted 40% of the resident population in 2012, numbering 4.1 million. The Republic of Rwanda's Ministry of Youth, Culture, and Sports defines youth as those from age 14 to 35 years. Like many developing countries, Rwanda's population as a whole is quite young. Over 50% of the Rwandan population is under 20 years old and the median age of the population is 22.7 years old. Urban areas of Rwanda have a higher percentage of youth than rural areas, though 80% of young people in Rwanda live in rural areas. Youth constitute over 53% of the population within the capital, Kigali. The youth population in Rwanda grew by 30% from 2002 to 2012.

The genocide against the Tutsi in Rwanda in 1994 destroyed the economy, government, and families. The slaughter of 500,000 to 1,000,000 Tutsi and moderate Hutu also had a negative effect on children and vulnerable groups. Youth in Rwanda today represent a generation who were only infants during the genocide or hadn't yet been born. Current President Paul Kagame calls this generation "the new Rwanda," alluding to their experiences only living under the post-genocide, Rwandan Patriotic Front government. In order to create a unified narrative of the events of the genocide, the Rwandan government has developed educational and memorial programs. These government programs work to socialize youth with a particular, homogeneous narrative of the genocide in which they did not directly experience.

The effects of the genocide continue to impact the lives of all Rwandan people and have had specific impacts on young people's education, health, and family situation. With the destruction of the economic, governmental, and familial systems, an overwhelming majority of Rwandan youth live in poverty and do not pursue education past primary school. The genocide, increased rates of poverty, and death from HIV/AIDS have left over 95,000 Rwandan children and youth orphaned.

== Education ==
Prior to colonization, the Rwandan education system was unstructured. German colonized the country but was quickly replaced by Belgium who redefined many Rwandan systems including education. Catholic missionaries who had arrived in Rwanda earlier than German colonizers had set up some missionary schools to educate Rwandan youth and the Belgian colonizers continued to allow the Church to do educational work. Belgium created schools of their own between 1923 and 1925 but all were closed before 1929. Belgium instead gained indirect control over missionary schools. When Rwanda gained independence in 1962, the new government implemented free and obligatory primary education and kept the colonial system of education intact.

Today, the Ministry of Education oversees all public education programs in the country and works "to transform the Rwandese citizen into skilled human capital for socio-economic development of the country by ensuring equitable access to quality education focusing on combating illiteracy, promotion of science and technology, critical thinking and positive values." After 1994, public services had to be recreated and re-imagined to work towards the new goals and ideals of Rwanda.

The public pre-primary to secondary education system in Rwanda is split into four levels, followed by higher education. Preprimary education enrollment remains small but is growing for children 3–6 years old. Primary education serves students from 7-12 for a 6-year cycle. Tronc commun, a three-year extension of fee-free basic education, acts as a lower division secondary education. Upper secondary education requires a fee and a test for admission immediately after the conclusion of tronc commun. 60 percent of upper secondary schools are boarding schools. Following upper secondary school, students complete the A-level examination that determines a students ability and qualifications to attend universities and other post-secondary institutions. Rwanda has unified their public higher education system as the University of Rwanda and private higher education institutions have been developed and grown.

=== UN Millennium Development Goals ===
Rwanda signed on to and strives to meet the United Nations Millennium Development Goals (MDG). The same number of boys and girls enroll in primary school, reaching the MDG for gender parity in primary. Income disparity still remains an issue within the education system. Rwanda reflects the goals of the MDG by emphasizing education's ability to reduce poverty and promote economic development and sustainability. MDG focus on reaching 100% literacy rate. 84.6% of 15-19 year olds and 79.9% of 19-25 year olds are literate.

Two aspects of the MDG look at the initial enrollment in primary school and completion of the educational cycle. 98% of adolescents enroll in primary school at some time in Rwanda. The majority of students do not remain enrolled in school until completion in Rwanda.

=== Enrollment and retention rates ===
From 1998 to 2009, enrollment in primary school almost doubled, with the introduction of fee-free basic education in 2003. By 2008 almost 2.2 million students were enrolled in primary school. While primary school increased at an annual rate of 5.4, during the same period upper secondary school increased at a rate of 11 percent. The retention rate from primary to secondary has decreased over time. 42% of students entering primary school in 2002 completed school through upper secondary, whereas less than one third are expected to do so from students who entered primary school in 2008. 85% of students entering tronc commun, complete the end of upper secondary school.

Income disparity and gender disparity play a role in students not completing the education cycle. Students in the top 20 percent of wealth in Rwanda are eight times more likely to complete the education cycle than students in the bottom 20 percent of wealth. Direct costs of basic education and the school fees required for upper secondary education make it difficult for students from poor families and/or youth headed households to continue through the education system. The OLevel examination, taken at the end of tronc commun, determines a students enrollment in upper secondary education. Young men are more likely than young women to pass the OLevel examination and enroll in upper secondary education.

Higher education has seen an increase in enrollment with an annual rate of growth of 19 percent between 1999 and 2008. Young women represent 42 percent of higher education students.

== Health ==
The probability of death for males and females before reaching 15 years old is 23% and 19%, respectively. Youth, in general, experience much of the same health problems as adults in Rwanda. Communicable, or infectious, diseases constitute 90% of health complaints. Malaria remains the highest risk of mortality in Rwanda but has seen a sharp decline in cases and mortality. Between 2001 and 2007, malaria's lethality fell from 10.1% to 2%. Smoking and other forms of tobacco use is increasing within the country for young people. 24% of secondary students smoked in 2004 according to a World Health Organization survey. 12.3% of children from 13 to 15 years old smoked in 2008. Hospitals and health clinics have recorded an increase in patients admitted for tobacco related illness and abuse.

=== Sexual health ===
The HIV prevalence in Rwanda is 3 percent of the population between 15 and 49 years old. Youth in urban areas are more likely to contract HIV with the prevalence of HIV in urban areas at 7.3 percent versus 2.2 percent in rural areas. Urban young women, aged 15–24, have a prevalence of 3.9 percent, whereas young men have a prevalence of 1.1 percent. One sixth of young people in Rwanda are considered vulnerable because of HIV's effect on their lives.

The Rwandan government focuses attention of youth health initiatives on reproductive and sexual health. Young people get the most information on sexual health education programs and initiatives from the radio. Most youth education programs on HIV/AIDS focus on abstinence-only and do not stress the importance of condom use. The sexual activity of Rwandan youth reflect the low-level of education on condom use. Approximately 20 percent of Rwandan youth between 20 and 24 admit to having sexual intercourse before 18 years old. Sexual activity is more prevalent among women in low wealth households and among both male and female youth headed households. Condom use is less prevalent in those same youth versus the general population. Antiretroviral therapy (ART) available in the country allows HIV-infected individuals to continue to live within dating and sexual relationships into adulthood. Findings on whether or not young people living with HIV/AIDS document more or less high-risk sexual behaviors than those living without HIV/AIDS are inconclusive.

Rwanda's large population of orphans and high-risk youth are more vulnerable to transactional sex. These forms of sex are associated with a higher risk of HIV. Transactional sex is common in sub-Saharan Africa for youth in expanding economies in order to ensure their survival. The Ministry of Youth is working to eliminate the problem of transactional sex with the "Singurisha" (I am not for sale) campaign by educating businesses, churches, and other officials about the community's responsibility to address the issue.

== Orphans and vulnerable youth ==
The genocide has had a lasting effect on families within Rwanda. Government and private orphanages and other orphan systems were demolished during the course of the genocide and the killings themselves left an estimated ten percent of children aged 0–18 years old as orphans. About 10 percent of households, or 65,000 households, in Rwanda are now youth headed households. Over 300,000 children are living within such households with 90 percent being headed by girls. Youth headed households place young girls at a higher risk of sexual exploitation and transactional sex.

Orphans in Rwanda feel stigmatized and unsupported in their communities due to their possible relationship to HIV/AIDS. HIV/AIDS remains stigmatized in Rwanda and so orphans who have lost one or both parents to HIV/AIDS are seen as unclean. Also, some orphans from the genocide are children of perpetrators or extremist Hutus and they are disadvantaged because of their parents' pasts. Orphans are perceived as troublemakers and irresponsible within Rwanda. During and after the genocide, issues of trust came to light within the country and have continued to limit certain relationships. Children with parents and children without parents are an example of continued division within Rwanda. Due to the stigma associated with them, orphans find little support within their communities. Pervasive poverty reduces some community's ability to support orphans or youth held households. With little support, issues of anxiety, depression, and post-traumatic stress remain unfixed and are perpetuated. Young women are especially vulnerable with less potential contact with family or a caring adult than young men, leaving them more vulnerable for sexual abuse.

A vulnerable young person is not necessarily an orphan. 80 percent of rural youth are considered vulnerable in Rwanda. Vulnerable youth often migrate to Kigali with the hope of economic prosperity but have little opportunity or support within the urban setting to gain sustainable occupation. Vulnerable urban youth often live day to day in unstable and insecure situations.

== Transitions to adulthood ==
The traditional method for young men to transition to adulthood in Rwanda is through marriage. Before marriage, a young man must build a house for his future family. The Rwandan government has created regulations that define how and where new housing must be built. The Rwandan government calls the new community housing projects imidugudus. Imidugudus are villages where multiple families live within an area; different from the traditional rugo which were family compounds on a farmer's land. The government has strict regulations on how the houses must be built and young men are struggling to build them at all. A large obstacle for young men is the acquisition of roof tiles which are necessary for building a house and expensive in Rwanda. Young men search for opportunities for employment in order to provide for the roof tiles and other material for the house and often travel to large farms or Kigali out of desperation. Young men in Kigali struggle to find the employment they are in need of and must deal with the possibility of not reaching traditional adulthood.

Rwandan law prohibits marriage before twenty one years of age. Female youth, especially in rural Rwanda, are perceived as too old once they reach twenty-five years old. Female youth too do not reach female adulthood until after marriage. 12 percent of female youth may never be married and reach female adulthood due to having more women than men in Rwanda.
