= Espérance Nyirasafari =

Rwandan politician

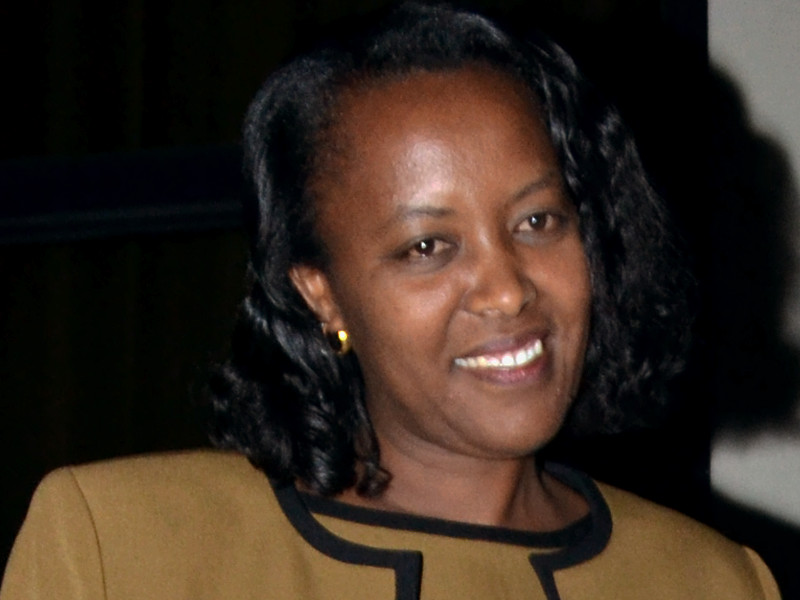
- Born: Rwanda
- Citizenship: Rwanda
- Occupations: Lawyer, politician
- Years active: 2016 — present
- Known for: Politics, Public service
- Title: Cabinet Minister of Sports and Culture in the Cabinet of Rwanda

Espérance Nyirasafari is a lawyer and politician in Rwanda, who serves as one of two Vice Presidents of the Senate of Rwanda, effective 17 October 2019. She was appointed to the Senate by the President of Rwanda, on 22 September 2019.

Before that, she served as the cabinet minister at the Ministry of Sports and Culture, from 18 October 2018, until 22 September 2019. Prior to that, from 5 October 2016 until 18 October 2018, she was the Minister of Gender and Family Promotion] (Migeprof).

== Background and education ==
Espérance was born in Rwanda to Rwandan parents; both of whom were killed in the 1994 Rwanda Genocide, when she was still young.

== Career ==
In 2009, she served as the permanent secretary in the Rwanda ministry of justice. At the time of her ministerial appointment, on 5 October 2016, she is reported to have been a member of the Rwandan Parliament. She replaced Diane Gashumba as minister at Migeprof, who became the Rwanda Minister of Health. In the cabinet reshuffle of 31 August 2017, Espérance Nyirasafari retained her portfolio at Migeprof. As cabinet minister, she advocates mutual respect among married couples to promote family harmony.

In a cabinet reshuffle on 18 October 2018, Espérance Nyirasafari was appointed Cabinet Minister of Sports and Culture. She joined the reshuffled cabinet of President Paul Kagame who reduced the members of cabinet from 31 to 26. The cabinet is 50% women, making Rwanda, with Ethiopia, the only two African countries with gender equality in their governments.

== Personal ==
Espérance Nyirasafari is a married mother.

== See also ==
- Parliament of Rwanda
