= Assumpta Ingabire =

Rwandan politician

Assumpta Ingabire is a Rwandan female politician, serving as the Minister of State, in Charge of Social Affairs in the Ministry of Local Government of Rwanda. Prior to her appointment, she had served consecutively as a Permanent secretary at the Ministry of Gender and Family Planning, and permanent Secretary at Ministry of Local Government of Rwanda.
