= Pascaline Ingabire =

Rwandan actress (born 1995)

Ingabire Pascaline
- Born: Ingabire Pascaline; 1995 (age 30–31); Kanombe, Kigali, Rwanda
- Occupations: Filmmaker, Film producer, Actress
- Years active: 2015–present
- Children: 1 (died)

Ingabire Pascaline (born 1995), is a Rwandan filmmaker, film producer and actress. She is best known for the roles in the drama films Teta, Igikomere and Samantha.

== Career ==
Ingabire began acting when she was in primary four, where she always participated in school plays. Just after completing high school in 2015, she entered the Rwandan cinema and appeared in a number of films such as Samantha, Teta, Ikiguzi Cy’amaraso, Igikomere, Nyirabayazana, Inzira Y’urupfu, Umuzirantenge and Mbirinde. As a director, she is running a YouTube series titled Inzozi (Dreams). In 2021, she acted in the film Selfish.

== Personal life ==
Pascaline Ingabire was born in Kanombe in Kigali City. She got married on July 30, 2019. On 16 April 2021, she gave birth at Kigali University Hospital (CHUK), but the baby died the next day.
