= Kigali Innovation City =

Technology cluster planned for Kigali in Rwanda

Kigali Innovation City (KIC) is a mixed-use city currently in development in Kigali, Rwanda. Situated on 60 hectares of land, KIC will seek to facilitate the development of pan-African talent and act as a technological innovation hub. Its plan includes four universities, office spaces, and start-up business incubators, alongside supporting facilities for retail, hospitality and accommodation. Kigali Innovation City is home to CMU-Africa, large corporations, and technology companies. Its goal is to drive Rwanda’s economic growth through digital transformation. The Government of Rwanda hopes to attract domestic and foreign universities, technology companies and biotech firms, and have commercial and retail real estate. It is intended to be built on 70 hectares of land in Kigali's Special Economic Zone in Gasabo District.

Kigali Innovation City is part of the Government of Rwanda's Vision 2020 program and a public–private partnership between the Government and Africa50. Africa50, an infrastructure investment platform founded by the African Development Bank (AfDB) and African states, is a co-sponsor and partner that will help develop and finance the project.

== See also ==
- Konza Technopolis
- Tatu City
- Silicon Savannah
