= Paula Ingabire =

Rwandan politician (born 1983)

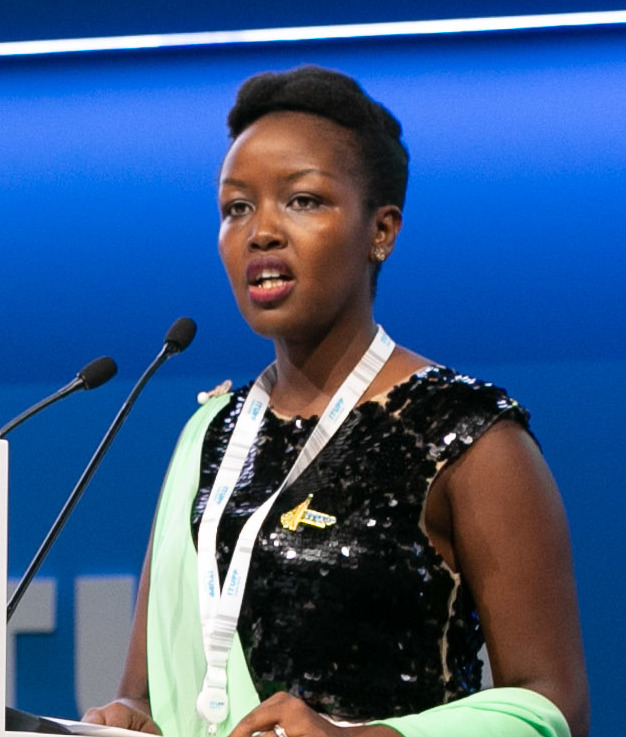
- Born: 24 January 1983 (age 43); Kenya
- Education: University of Rwanda (B.S.); Massachusetts Institute of Technology (M.S.)
- Occupations: Minister of ict and innovation
- Years active: 2008–present
- Known for: Technology and politics
- Title: Minister of ICT and Innovation in the cabinet of Rwanda

Paula Ingabire (born 1983) is a Rwandan technology professional and politician, who serves as the Minister of Information and communications technology and Innovation, in the Cabinet of Rwanda, since 18 October 2018.

== Background and education ==
Ingabire studied at the University of Rwanda, graduating with a bachelor's degree. She went on to obtain a master's degree in engineering and management from the Massachusetts Institute of Technology (MIT). She was a Systems Design & Management Fellow at MIT.

== Career before politics ==
Before her current appointment, Ingabire was the Head of the Kigali Innovation City initiative. Prior to that, she held the position of Head of ICT at the Rwanda Development Board.

== As a politician ==
Ingabire joined the reshuffled cabinet of President Paul Kagame who reduced the members of cabinet from 31 to 26. The cabinet is 50 percent women; making Rwanda, and Ethiopia, the only two African countries with gender equality in their governments.

As cabinet minister, Ingabire is a promoter and advocate of blockchain technology. She visualises the technology as being part of what she terms the fourth industrial revolution technologies. Such innovations can help Rwanda develop her healthcare systems, and tourism sectors, according to the minister. She attends the monthly meetings of the Rwanda Blockchain Community.

== Other activities ==
- World Economic Forum (WEF), Member of the Board of Trustees (since 2020)
- Africa Europe Foundation (AEF), Member of the High-Level Group of Personalities on Africa-Europe Relations (since 2020)

== Recognition ==
In March 2020, Ingabire was named among the 115 young global leaders of the year 2020, by the World Economic Forum. The list includes public officials, journalists, activists, artists, educators, business innovators, and technology developers, who are below the age of 40.
