= Valentine Uwamariya =

Minister in Rwanda

Valentine Uwamariya (born 14 May 1971) is a Rwandan politician. She is a member of the Senate since October 2025. Previously, she served as minister of education between 2020 and 2023, and as minister of genderal and family promotion between August 2023 and June 2024. She was minister of the environment between June 2024 and July 2025.

== Background and education ==
Valentine Uwamariya was born on 14 May 1971 at Shangi Sector in Nyamasheke District. She got her secondary school certificate from Groupe Scolaire Sainte Famille, Nyamasheke. She furthered her education and earned a bachelor's degree in Organic Chemistry from the National University in Rwanda. In 2005, Uwamariya bagged her master's degree in Electrochemistry from the University of Witwatersrand in South Africa. Thereafter in 2007, she got a scholarship to study a PhD Programme at UNESCO-IHE and in 2013 she earned a doctorate degree. Her PhD Thesis was titled: Adsorptive removal of heavy metals from groundwater by iron oxide based adsorbent.

== Career ==
Uwamariya served as the Deputy Vice Chancellor in charge of Training, Institutional Development and Research in the newly established Rwanda Polytechnic just before she came the Minister of Education. She served in this position from 2020 to 2023 when she was redeployed to the Ministry of Gender and Family Promotion in a cabinet reshuffle by President Paul Kagame in August 2023. She replaced Jeannette Bayisenge in this position.

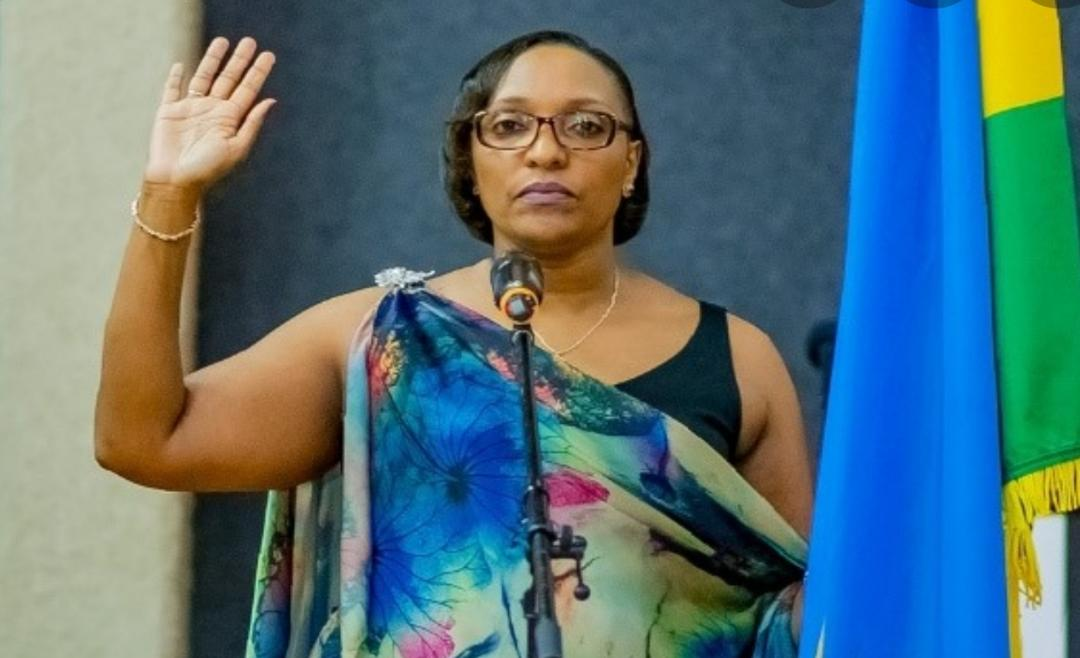
Valentine Uwamariya as Minister of Environment

In June 2024 she became minister of the environment. Uwamariya was replaced in July 2025 by Bernadette Arakwiye.

On 21 October 2025, Uwamariya together with Alfred Gasana was appointed to the Senate by Rwandan president Paul Kagame, replacing Epiphanie Kanziza and André Twahirwa.
