= Claudine Uwera =

Rwandan politician and economist

Senior Strategic Advisor, Office of the Prime Minister of Rwanda
- Incumbent
- Assumed office 9 November 2024

Minister of State for the Environment
- In office 22 August 2023 – 16 August 2024
- President: Paul Kagame
- Prime Minister: Édouard Ngirente

Minister of State in charge of Economic Planning
- In office 6 April 2018 – 22 August 2023
- President: Paul Kagame
- Prime Minister: Édouard Ngirente

Personal details
- Born: January 27, 1976 (age 50) Rwanda
- Education: University of Gothenburg (PhD, Environmental Economics)
- Occupation: Politician
- Profession: Economist

Claudine Uwera (born 27 January 1976) is a Rwandan Politician and Economist. She currently serves as “Senior Strategic Advisor” in the Office of the Prime Minister of the Republic Rwanda, since Nov.9, 2024.

Prior to the appointment, she served as Minister of State for the Environment in the Ministry of Environment in Rwanda, from August 22, 2023 to August 16, 2024. She previously served as Minister of State in charge of Economic Planning in the Ministry of Finance and Economic Planning in Rwanda, from April 6, 2018 to August 22, 2023.

From 2015 to 2018, Claudine Uwera was the National Coordinator of the “Rwanda Natural Capital Accounting Program” under “WAVES”; a World Bank-led global partnership that is part of the Global Program for Sustainability.

== Educations ==
Claudine received her early education in Burundi & Rwanda. She did her undergraduate studies at the National University of Rwanda & obtained a Bachelor degree of Economics in 2001. She then travelled to Belgium and followed a Master’s programme of “Gestion du Développement”, in the Faculty of Economics, Social & Management at the University of Liège (2005 to 2007). From 2008 to 2013, she pursued her PhD studies in the Department of Economics of the University of Gothenburg in Sweden, where she obtained her PhD degree in Environmental Economics.

Claudine Uwera has taught at the University of Rwanda in the School of Economics for more than 10 years, over 2003-2018. She also served as Dean of the School of Economics through 2014-2015.

== Political career ==
Initially, Claudine Uwera was appointed as Minister of State in Charge of Economic Planning (April 2018- August 2023) and then as Minister of State for the Environment (August 2023-August 2024). Since Nov.9, 2024 she is serving as Senior Strategic Advisor in the Office of the Prime Minister.

== Personal life ==
Claudine Uwera is married and is the mother of three children.
