= Ines Mpambara =

Rwandan politician

Ines Mpambara is a Rwandan politician who currently serves as minister in charge of cabinet affairs since March 2020.

== Career ==
Until her appointment, she had been serving as Director of Cabinet in the Office of the President of Rwanda for more than 10 years. She had also previously worked at the Ministry of Health where she held different positions, Before that she worked at the former National University of Rwanda as a Lecturer and Director of the School of Journalism and Communication.
