= Jeannette Bayisenge =

Rwandan politician and socialist

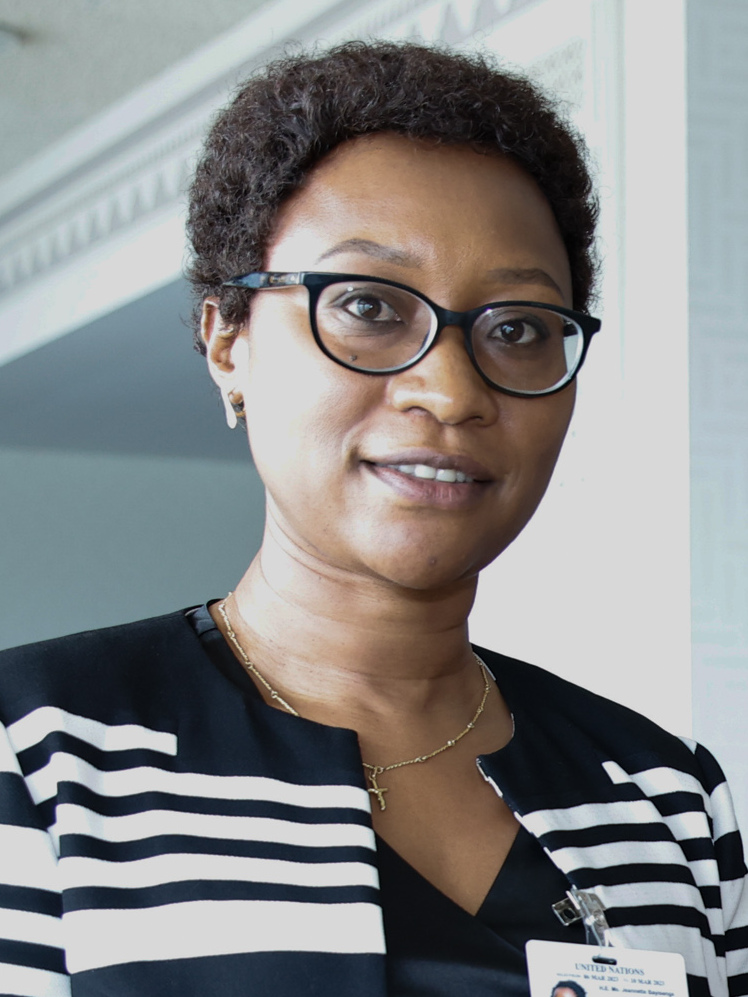
- Jeannette Bayisenge in 2023

Minister of Gender and family Promotion
- In office 2020–2023

Associate Professor of Gender Studies at the University of Rwanda

Jeannette Bayisenge is a Rwandan socialist politician and the former minister of Public Service and Labour in Rwanda. She was appointed to the role by President Paul Kagame on 22 August 2023. She has also served as Minister of Gender and Family Promotion in Rwanda (MIGEPROF) since 2020, and as Associate Professor of gender studies at the University of Rwanda.

== Early life and education ==
Bayisenge holds a Ph.D. in Social Work with a focus on Gender from the University of Gothenburg, Sweden, a master's degree in Development Cooperation with a Specialization in Women and Development from EWHA Woman's University in Seoul, South Korea, and a bachelor's degree in Social Work from the National University of Rwanda.

== Career ==
Jeannette Bayisenge's political career began in 2020 when she assumed the role of the Minister of Gender and Family Promotion in Rwanda. She has actively participated in promoting gender equality and family welfare in Rwanda, and social progress, particularly in Kigali city. Her efforts as Minister have focused on advancing women's rights and empowerment, addressing gender-based violence, and implementing policies that enhance family well-being.

Prior to her appointment, Bayisenge served as Director of the Centre of Gender Studies and Associate Professor of Gender Studies at the University of Rwanda's College of Arts and Social Sciences (UR-CASS), where she had worked since 2004. She has also served as the President of the National Women's Council since June 2018. Bayisenge also served on several boards and councils including the Chairperson of the Council of the City of Kigali and Gasabo District, Vice Chairperson of Board of Directors in Local Administrative Entities Development Agency (LODA), as well as Board Member in Rwanda National ID Agency (NIDA).

In 2023, Bayisenge participated in the Women Delver conference, which was held in Rwanda for the first time that year. She was the chair of the WD2023 Host Country committee in Kigali Convention Centre, and said that gender equality will only exist when all the people have equal access to the power dignity, justice, rights, health, and opportunities that will enable them to network and develop skills in sharing knowledge. She has also said that this will be harmonized by getting access on funding opportunities as well as participating in conversations that contribute to the global agenda on gender equality.

== Private life ==
Jeannette Bayisenge was born and raised in Rwanda. She has 3 children, all sons. Her passion for gender equality and social justice has been evident throughout her career, both in academia and politics. Her dedication to creating a more inclusive and equitable society has earned her recognition from her peers and constituents alike.
