= Gender equality in Rwanda =

As of 2018, the African country Rwanda ranks in the top five countries for gender equality according to the Global Gender Gap Report. The idea of fairness that dominates this country arose after the genocide against the Tutsi that occurred in 1994. The government is committed to ensuring equal rights for women and men without prejudice to the principles of gender equality and complementarity in national development. These ideas are exhibited through the roles of Rwanda women in government, the respect for women's education and the role of women in Rwanda healthcare. The country also took an active stance against rape in genocide, created a national action plan after United Nations Resolution 1325, and is pushing towards ending gender-based violence.

That said, in 2026, questions have arisen as to how true these claims are. In August 2026, Rwanda National Police promised to crack down on “indecency” and started arresting women dressed in any attire that exposed shoulders or were above the knees. Videos circulated on social media showed handcuffed women being bundled onto the floors of police trucks. These images drew backlash especially among Rwanda’s elite but was met with silence from Rwandan leadership, including the Ministry of Gender - the institution charged with driving towards gender equality. These incidents opened a can of worms as men started to share their opinions on why women who are indecently dressed deserve to be raped. Furthermore women who have previously reported rape, brought to light the fact that they were never taken seriously by Rwanda Police or even the Ministry that was put out to look out for them. President Paul Kagame has been accused of painting a picture of gender equality as a way to attract donors, investors and goodwill from the West; accusers point out that it's a facade and that Rwandan women are nowhere close to the equality or equity that is promoted in the media. As such, recent events have been pointed to as evidence that this has likely been the case this whole time.

== Gender equality in the Rwandan government ==
Following the 1994 Rwandan genocide, in 2003 the new Constitution of Rwanda was established, which was the first step in allowing women to be a part of the decision-making. This new Constitution gave way for men and women to have equal rights. The Rwandan government is set up to have at least 61 percent of its parliament members be women. In an 80-member parliament, 46 members were female in 2003. As of 2013, women occupied 60% of the Rwandan Parliament and are able to be involved in all decision-making. The Rwandan government is a single-party system, with the Rwandan Patriotic Front (RPF) at the forefront able to suppress any opposition. With this system, if a woman politician opposes legislation, it is difficult to argue for the need to continue allegiance to the RPF. In Rwandan civil society it is difficult to advocate for or oppose legislation through the use of non-governmental organizations due to the Rwandan government creating new laws and regulations giving control of these groups to the government. Due to this, the women's movement for the most part has only been successful when aligning their beliefs and opinions with the RPF and what the RPF's vision for their society is.

Inside Rwanda's government, there is a Ministry of Gender and Family Promotion, a gender monitory office, and a commitment to gender-based budgeting that ensures the promotion of gender equality. The government supports programs like Women for Women International Rwanda, which focuses on women of the country becoming economically independent. The government also has promoted gender equality in Rwanda using the Ministry of Gender and Family Promotion. The Ministry of Gender and Family Promotion attributed heavily to the creation of the National Gender Policy and Action Plan. In one significant change, women have been given the same right as men to inherit land and in other factors like in some government posts, the military, and education. For most women, it is difficult for them to actualize their inheritance, and due to this, in 2005 there was the Land Law passed, but this may have made the women struggle with their inheritance rights even more. Throughout Rwandan society due to social norms, women are still only seen as "women" when they are able to marry. Even with the inheritance laws, marriage is what allows women to finally receive their rights to property and inheritance and improved employment prospects and if a woman is not married they do not have any inheritance rights under common law, which is still practiced in civil society. The New Civil Code is another way that the Rwandan government has promoted gender equality. This code allows women to be able to open bank accounts in their own name, appear in court regarding their matrimonial property, and use their own name when involved in administrative actions. The Gender Monitoring Office, founded in 2007 as an independent organization, was created to monitor certain areas in the country to ensure the promotion of gender equality and that institutions were being help accountable for their actions on gender equality. Some other important governmental programs that had an impact on gender equality were the High Intensive Labor Program, Women Guarantee Fund, and Creation of Women's Bank, which helped women reduce their economic dependence on men and women were able to be more in control amongst their family dynamics. These programs have also helped to reduce poverty levels where women headed households poverty levels, where in 2001, women households in poverty were at 66.3% but in 2006 they decreased to 60.2%, and widowed women in poverty were at 67.7% in 2002 and decreased to 59.9% in 2006.

== Rape in genocide ==
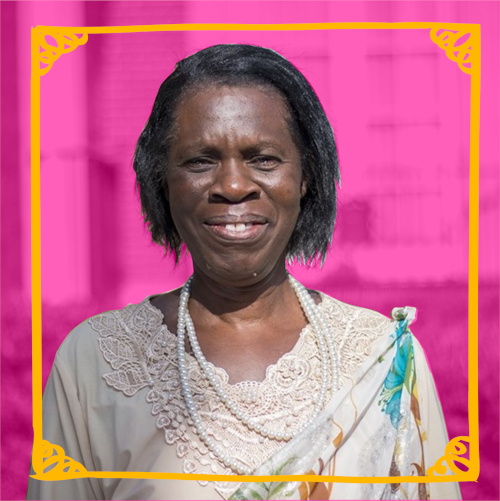
Godelieve Mukasarasi

Rape was used throughout the Rwandan genocide by Hutu men to gain power and control over Tutsi women. This act was even encouraged by leaders as a weapon of war. The prominent Hutu Minister of Family and Women's Affairs for Rwanda, Pauline Nyiramasuhuko, emboldened Hutu men by distributing contraception for the purpose of rape. Nyiramasuhuko was quoted saying, "Before you kill the women, you need to rape them."

The United Nations speculates that about 250,000 to 500,000 women experienced rape during the genocide. These numbers may be modest when considering the stigma surrounding sexual violence within Rwanda. When Rwanda began to process the crimes committed during genocide, Rwandan law only categorized rape as a Category Four crime. This category is similar in severity to stealing property, not taking into account the severe trauma these women may be experiencing. Social worker Godeliève Mukasarasi realized this injustice and gathered rape survivors from genocide to testify their stories in Parliament. Mukasarasi's work allowed for members of Parliament to see the severity of rape in war and genocide. Rwandan legislators changed this act in genocide law from a Category Four to a Category One crime. Category One is equal to killing someone to perpetuate reasons of genocide. This legal affirmation of rape as a weapon in genocide solidifies the country's push towards gender equality.

Godelieve Mukasarasi also started a program called "SEVOTA" to help women and children impacted by rape and genocide processed through trauma. "SEVOTA" stands for Solidarity for the Blooming of the Widows and the Orphans aiming at Work and Self-promotion. Her program uses the arts and small group fellowship to help women and children share their experiences and break the stigma around sexual violence. This program also helps create relationships between children who were born from genocidal rape and their mothers. "SEVOTA" gives Rwandan women and survivors the tools to speak out about rape and sexual assault, with the aim to remove societal shame and bring empowerment.

== United Nations Resolution 1325 in Rwanda ==
The United Nations issued Resolution 1325 in 2000 to affirm their dedication to international gender equality. This document was crafted after the atrocities of the Rwandan genocide and focuses on how gender-based violence played a role in the conflict. Resolution 1325 specifically references how violence like genocide disproportionately hurts women and children. These women living in conflict-ridden states should also have a major role in stabilization efforts. The resolution details how women need to have an active voice in their respective governments, deserve defense from sexual assault and rape, need legal protections against gender-based attacks, and should be offered inclusivity in emergency aid programs. Most countries put Resolution 1325 into action through nation specific plans and commitments to end gender based violence. Rwanda specifically implemented Resolution 1325 in 2010 with an aim to end domestic violence and intimate partner violence. Since 2010, Rwanda has created a new national action plan, which went into effect in 2018 for 2018–2022, with another plan going into place in 2023 and be implemented until 2028 with a budget of RwF15 billion. The national action plan also worked on relations between the genders after genocide and generating economic sustainability for women throughout the country. Since the implementation in 2010, Rwanda has become top ranked in the world for participation of women in the government. There is some skepticism on how Resolution 1325 actually impacts women living in areas that are not involved in high-profile politics. There are some evident differences between the governmental level of gender equality and the local level. The women in the Rwandan government are mainly involved in the decisions about women's health. The measured success of the national action plan did not have tangible results specifically correlated to the resolution.

== Educational advancements ==
Rwanda has all pushed for girls education since the mass genocide. In 2004, The Girls' Education Task Force (GETF) was created under the Ministry of Education to promote education for young girls. Since 2004, there have been several other policies created by the Rwandan government to continue gender equality in education. These include the Girls Education Policy (2008), the National Education Policy (2010), and the University of Rwanda Gender Policy (2016) These programs dedicated 50% of student university positions to women and created remedial classes to help women navigate classes before choosing to drop out of high school. Programs have been created to help educate women who may have previously been kept out of school and allows them to receive the education they have been denied. These programs for equality in education are not for girls only though; programs have been implemented that allow both boys and girls to discuss women's education. The Aikiah Institute is the first all-female college in Rwanda and supports equality between genders by "preparing their students to be the future of the nation." In 2012, Rwanda won the Commonwealth Education Good Practice Award due to the increased access for girls and boys equally in basic education.

Despite these implementations and changes dedicated to women in education, they are still at a disadvantage compared to men. In Rwanda, social norms still have a negative impact on the empowerment of women's and girl's education which can lead to females dropping out at higher rates than males and starting formal education later than males. Social norms also cause girls to be expected to remain home and help their mothers with their domestic chores, while boys are sent to get their educations. Also, it is found that passing senior secondary examinations and being admitted into state universities is more likely to happen among boys than girls and due to this, places in higher education for women, even though 50% is supposed to be reserved for them, is only at a little over 30%.

== Gender equality in healthcare ==
Rwanda has made many changes to promote equity for all, with one category that they have worked to improve in being healthcare. Malaria, HIV/AIDS and cholera were once prevalent in Rwanda. However, since the mass genocide that happened in 1994, Rwanda has been working to improve these conditions. The Rwandan government has partnered with Harvard's Public In Health and global health advocate; Paul Farmer. With this aid, the Rwandan government has completely re-standardized its health system. The promotion of health for women has been led by Rwanda health minister, Agnes Binagwaho. Binagwaho has pushed for equality in the healthcare system by advocating for young girls to receive the HPV vaccine Additionally, One UN Rwanda leads discussion groups on reproductive health and contraceptives to teach college women about health.

== Ending gender-based violence ==
The passing of the 2008 Gender-Based Violence Law made Rwanda the first Sub-Saharan African country to pass a law addressing gender-based violence. Due to this law, domestic violence is outlawed and the penalty is 6 months to 2 years imprisonment and women are now allowed to have fault divorce if there is domestic violence involved. Organizations like the Rwanda Women's Network have been created to help fight against domestic violence and gender-based violence. Also, the national police force created a Gender Desk which provides support and services to women involved in domestic violence and to help train police officers and local authorities on human rights and impacts of gender-based violence. This Gender Desk has allowed thousands of women to be saved. Despite the help being offered, most cases of gender-based violence, mainly domestic violence, go unreported due to fear of it causing further violence. Also, some victims will withdraw their complaints and want their husbands to be removed from police custody because the men primary income and heads of their families.

Although Rwanda outlawed marital rape in 2009, there is still some work left to end gender-based violence in the country. In 2009, the gender-based violence campaign found that, during a 3 year period, 259 wives were murdered by their husbands, there were 2000 rape cases reported, and there were 10,000 rapes of children under the age of 18. As of 2015, 21 percent of women in Rwanda experienced physical and/or sexual intimate partner violence over the course of 12 months. This statistic is still a large improvement from when a vast number of women were raped during the genocide.

A study done by BioMed Central analyzes the rates of intimate partner violence throughout Rwanda after the genocide, specifically in the years 2005 and 2010. In this case, intimate partner violence is defined as physical, emotional, mental, or sexual abuse within a partnered relationship. According to BioMed Central, 34 percent of Rwandan women claimed to have been in a partnered relationship and survived intimate partner violence in 2005. This number jumped to 56 percent in 2010. This increase could be attributed to the lessening of stigma in regards to intimate partner violence throughout Rwanda. Women are feeling more comfortable when sharing their experiences. Additionally, there was a sharp increase in female political leaders after the genocide in 2003, challenging strict gender roles throughout the country. BioMed Central also found that the rates of intimate partner violence could possibly have increased due to the visible amounts of powerful women in Rwandan society. Both of these theories indicate a slight shift in societal norms regarding gender based violence.

Another study conducted by departmental researchers at the University of Rwanda, Kigali, Umeå University, Sweden, and the University of Gothenburg, Sweden, investigated the stigma of intimate partner violence throughout Rwanda. The data shows that even though the state of Rwanda took an active stance against intimate partner violence, the societal standards for women were still in line with traditional gender roles. These varied standards impacted how women utilized resources when experiencing violence. This study also proves that to fully eradicate gender-based violence, change must come from Rwandan society as well as implemented policy.

In August 2026, videos of women being harassed by police and spectators based on how they were dressed, circulated on social media. This gender based violence by state apparatus is a clear sign that Rwanda still has a long way to go and that all the claims made are mostly aspirational.

== Advancing gender equality ==
Women in Rwanda have also been working to close the gender-based wage gap. In 2018, Rwandan women make eighty-eight cents to a man's dollar, which puts Rwanda as number 25 for economic equality among genders.
