= Justin Nsengiyumva =

Prime Minister of Rwanda since 2025

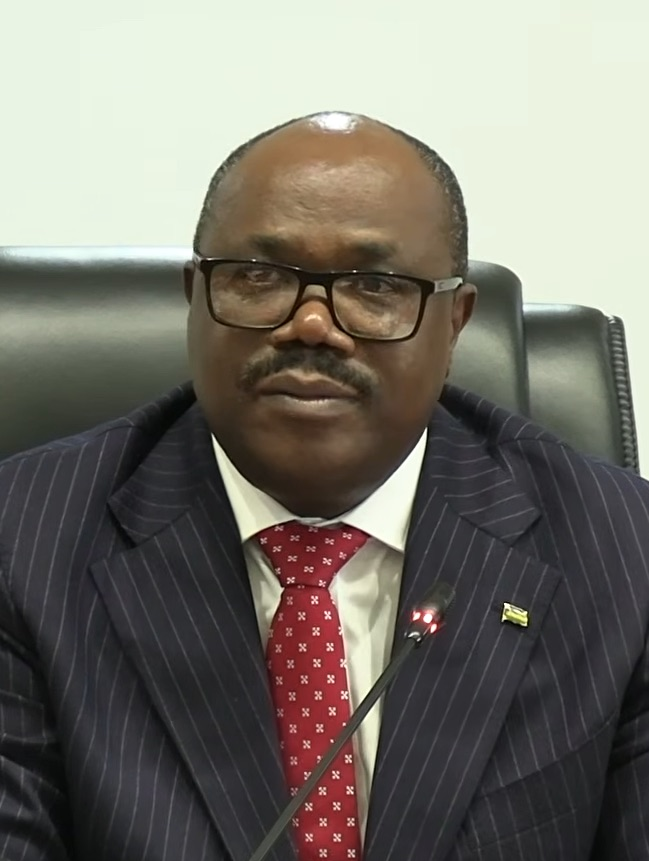
- Nsengiyumva in 2026

Prime Minister of Rwanda
- Incumbent
- Assumed office 25 July 2025
- President: Paul Kagame
- Preceded by: Édouard Ngirente

Personal details
- Born: 10 October 1971 (age 54)
- Education: Catholic University of Eastern Africa; University of Nairobi; University of Leicester

Justin Nsengiyumva (born 10 October 1971) is a Rwandan banker and politician serving as the current Prime Minister of Rwanda since 25 July 2025.

== Biography ==
Nsengiyumva was born on 10 October 1971. He received a bachelor's degree from the Catholic University of Eastern Africa. He worked as one of the senior trade negotiators for the Rwandan government before becoming Permanent Secretary of the Ministry of Trade and Industry. After that, he served as Permanent Secretary in the Ministry of Education before leaving the post in 2008. In November 2008, he was arrested and later convicted on corruption charges. Afterwards, he left Rwanda for Kenya, where he earned a master's degree from the University of Nairobi.

After Nsengiyumva graduated from the University of Nairobi, he moved to the United Kingdom and received UK citizenship. There, he attended the University of Leicester, receiving a Doctor of Philosophy degree. He worked as a graduate teaching assistant while at Leicester and later served as governor of All Hallows Roman Catholic High School in Salford. Nsengiyumva worked for the organization Refugee Action for five years as a policy and research development manager and served as a national trustee with the Greater Manchester Immigration Aid Unit. He also served as community governor at Sir John Deane's College.

Nsengiyumva also worked as a civil servant in the British government, serving as an economist for the Department for Work and Pensions and then as senior economic advisor at the Office of Rail and Road, the regulator of British railways. After having been away from Rwanda since 2008, he returned in 2025 and was named deputy governor of the National Bank of Rwanda by President Paul Kagame in February 2025. He had previously been pardoned along with 380 others by Kagame in 2023. On 23 July 2025, Kagame appointed Nsengiyumva the new Prime Minister of Rwanda, replacing Édouard Ngirente.
