= Rosemary Mbabazi =

Rwandan businesswoman and politician

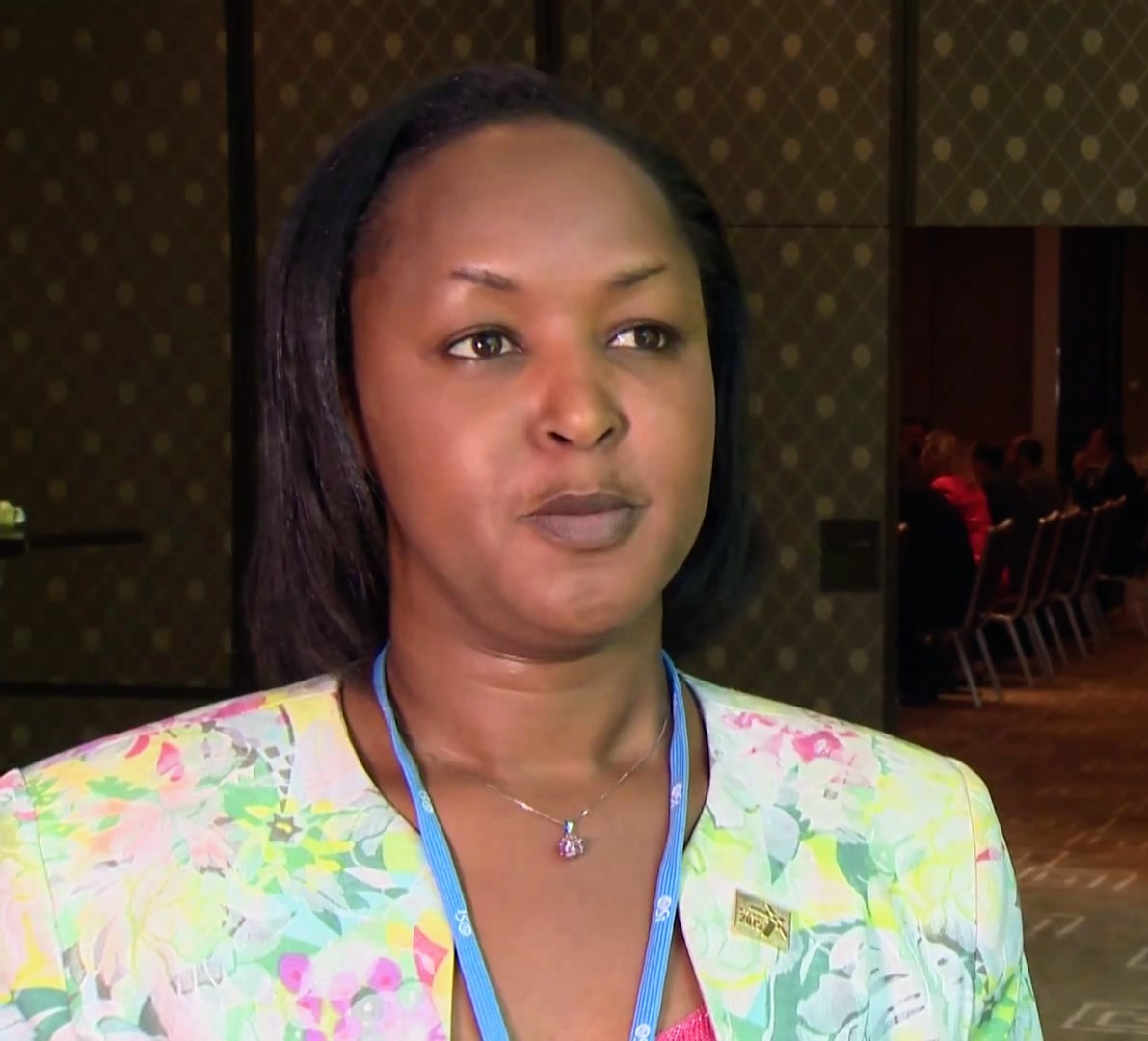
- Mbabazi in 2015
- Born: Rwanda
- Citizenship: Rwandan
- Education: Makerere University (Bachelor of Education); Institution in the United Kingdom (Master of Business Administration)
- Occupations: Politician, businesswoman
- Years active: 2009–present
- Known for: Politics
- Title: Cabinet Minister for Youth, in the Cabinet of Rwanda

Rosmary Mbabazi is a businesswoman and politician in Rwanda, who has served as the Cabinet Minister for Youth and Culture in the Rwandan cabinet since 31 August 2017.

== Background and education ==
Mbabazi holds a bachelor's degree in education, obtained from Makerere University, in Kampala, Uganda. She also holds a Master of Business Administration, from an institution in the United Kingdom.

== Career ==
From 2009 until 2011, she served as the Head of the investment promotion department in the Rwanda Development Board. In 2011, Rosemary Mbabazi was appointed a caretaker of Umubano Hotel and the chairperson of Soprotel, a joint venture company between governments of Rwanda and Libya. In February 2012, she was appointed the Permanent Secretary in the Ministry of Youth and ICT, serving in that capacity until February 2017, when she was transferred to the Rwanda Ministry of Trade, Industry and East African Community Affairs (MINEACOM), as the permanent secretary.

In the cabinet reshuffle of 31 August 2017, Mbabazi was appointed the cabinet minister for the newly created Ministry of Youth, the former Ministry of Youth and ICT, having been split into two dockets.

== Other responsibilities ==
Rosemary Mbabazi has previously served as a member of the board of directors of Rwanda Revenue Authority.

== See also ==
- Judith Uwizeye
