= Marie-Solange Kayisire =

Rwandan politician

- Born: Burundi
- Citizenship: Rwanda
- Occupation: Politician
- Years active: 2017 — present
- Known for: Politics
- Title: Minister of Cabinet Affairs; Cabinet of Rwanda

Marie-Solange Kayisire is a politician in Rwanda, who has served as the Minister of Cabinet Affairs, in the Office of the Prime Minister and a member of the Rwandan cabinet, since 31 August 2017.

== Political career ==
Marie-Solange Kayisire served as the Minister of Cabinet Affairs, in the Office of the Prime Minister and as a member of the Rwandan cabinet, since 31 August 2017.

On 2 March 2020, the outgoing Minister in charge of Emergency management Germaine Kamayirese handed over to the new Minister Kayisire Marie-Solange. She stated that enhancing Disaster Prevention and Mitigation as well as public awareness will be among her top priorities.

== Commitments ==
=== Refugees ===
Marie-Solange Kayisire heavily involved in making refugees lives better. She inaugurated the maternity ward constructed in Mahama refugee camp with funds from the Government and the people of Japan.

=== Unity Club ===
The Minister of Emergency management is also the Vice-President of a club called the "Unity Club", an organization that brings together current and former members of the current cabinet.

Unity Club is focused on making sure that bad history tainted by hate has no place in Rwandan society.

=== Environment ===
In 2022 attended a meeting between the government of Rwanda and a company called Planet Labs PBC to discuss how to leverage satellite imagery data to improve environmental, agricultural, and disaster management among areas in Rwanda.

== See also ==
- Parliament of Rwanda
- Prime Minister of Rwanda
