= Jeanne d'Arc Mujawamariya =

Rwandan politician (born 1970)

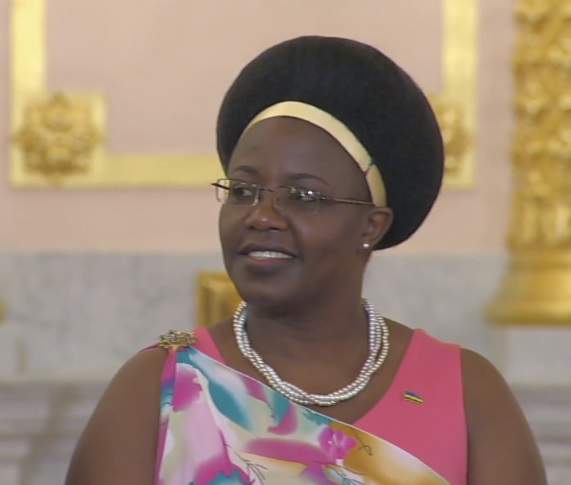
Jeanne d’Arc Mujawamariya in 2014

Jeanne d'Arc Mujawamariya (born on March 13th in Kigali) is a Rwandan politician who served as the Minister of Public Service and Labor from June 12, 2024 to 25 July 2024 and as Minister of Environment from November 4, 2019 to June 12th, 2024. She was formerly the Minister of Gender and Family Promotion, Minister of Education (formally, the Minister of Education, Science, Technology and Research) in the government of Rwanda she served as well as the Rector/Vice Chancellor of KIST-(Kigali Institute of Science and Technology) and the Rwandan Ambassador to Russian Federation and Belarus from March 2013 to November 2019.

She speaks fluently 5 languages including her mother tongue Kinyarwanda, French, English, Russian and Swahili.

== Personal life and education ==
Mujawamariya earned a Bachelor of Science from Peoples' Friendship University of Russia and in 1997 received a Master of Science in chemistry from the same university. She went on to earn a Ph.D. in Physical chemistry/ Electrochemistry Heavy Metals Polymer Membranes at Indian Institute of Technology Roorkee in 2001. She is married and has three children with her husband. Dr Mujawamariya fluently speaks Kinyarwanda, French, English, Russian, and Swahili.

Dr. Mujawamariya is a Certified Advisor from UNSS College in Green Marketing Challenge and accredited by UNEP and One Planet – May 2025. she is also Certified Professional from UN System Staff College in Sustainable Lifestyles and accredited by UNEP – May 2025 and Certified Professional from UN System Staff College in Applying Integrated Policy Approaches to Accelerate the 2030 Agenda and accredited by UNDP and UNICEF. – June 2025. She earned these three certificates from May to June 2025.

== Political career ==
- From June 12th, 2024 to July 25th, 2024 she was the Minister of Public Services and Labor of the Republic of Rwanda.
- From 2019 to June 2024 she served as Minister of Environment, of the Republic of Rwanda
- From 2013 to 2019 she served as Ambassador of Rwanda in Russia.
- Vice Chancellor / Rector of Kigali Institute of Science and Technology (2011–2013)
- Minister in Prime Minister's Office in Charge of Gender and Family Promotion (2008- 2011)
- From 2006-March 2008, she was the Minister of Education.
- In 2005-2006 she became the Minister of State in Charge of Higher Education in the same Ministry.
- From 2003 to 2005, she served as Minister of State for Primary and Secondary Education in the Ministry of Education of the Rwandan government.
- Lecturer (of Physical Chemistry) at Faculty of Education / Department of Biology &Chemistry at National University of Rwanda (2001–2003)
- In November 2019, she became the Minister of the Environment and Russian media wrote about this appointment .
