= Judith Uwizeye =

Rwandan lawyer, academic and politician

- Born: 20 August 1979 (age 47); Rwanda
- Citizenship: Rwandan
- Education: National University of Rwanda (Bachelor of Laws); University of Groningen (Master's Degree in International Economics and Business Law)
- Occupations: Lawyer, academic & politician
- Years active: 2006–present
- Organization: Government of Rwanda
- Known for: Academia, politics
- Title: Cabinet Minister in the Office of the President, in the Cabinet of Rwanda

Judith Uwizeye is a lawyer, academic and politician in Rwanda, who has served as the Cabinet Minister in the Office of the President, since 31 August 2017. From July 2014 until August 2017, she served as the cabinet minister of public service and labour in the Cabinet of Rwanda.

== Background ==
She was born in Rwanda, on 20 August 1979. She obtained her Bachelor of Laws from the National University of Rwanda in 2006. She then proceeded to the University of Groningen in the Netherlands where she graduated with a Master's degree in International Economic and Business Law.

== Career ==
In 2006, Uwizeye began teaching in the faculty of law at the then National University of Rwanda, in Huye. The institution has since merged with other public higher institutions of learning to become University of Rwanda. At the time of her ministerial appointment in 2014, she had risen to the rank of Assistant Lecturer, in international economics and business law.

== Personal life ==
Judith Uwizeye is married to Manase Ntihinyurwa, a customs officer with the Rwanda Revenue Authority, and together are the parents of two young children.

== See also ==
- Parliament of Rwanda
- Rosemary Mbabazi
