= Emblem of Rwanda =

National symbol of Rwanda

National emblem of Rwanda
- Armiger: Republic of Rwanda
- Adopted: 31 December 2001; 24 years ago
- Motto: Ubumwe, Umurimo, Gukunda Igihugu (Kinyarwanda); Unity, Work, Patriotism (English); Unité, Travail, Patriotisme (French); Umoja, Kazi, Uzalendo (Swahili)

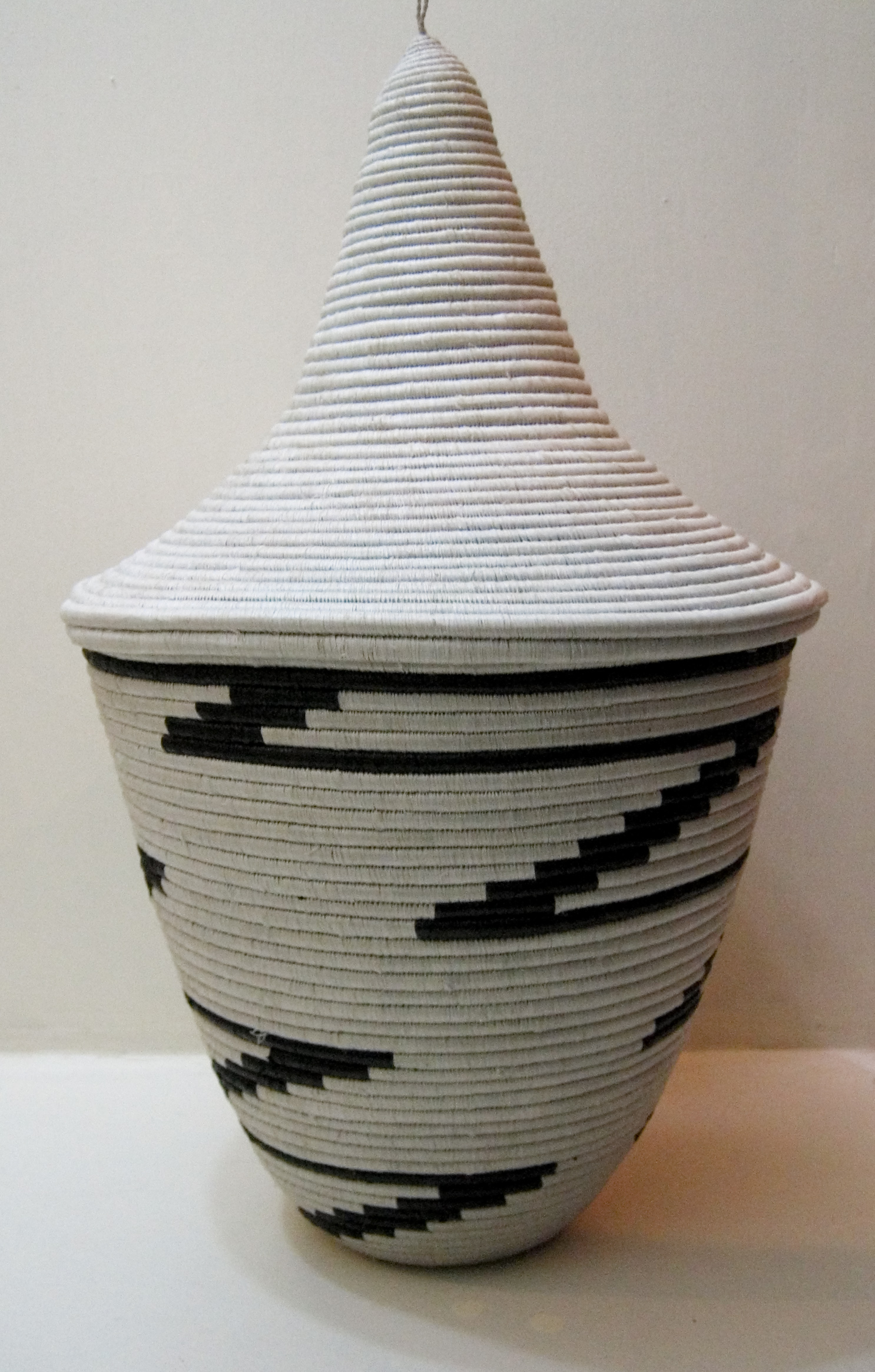
Agaseke, traditional basket

The Emblem of Rwanda is the national symbol and used by the Government of Rwanda. It was restyled in 2001 to match the color scheme of the new national flag. The text reads "Republic of Rwanda – Unity, Work, Patriotism" in Kinyarwanda. The central tribal devices, a stem of sorghum, a branch of a coffee tree and a traditional basket are surmounted on a cogwheel with the sun with its rays above, while two typical Rwandan shields protects them, one on the right and one on the left. They are encircled by a square knot.

The details of the emblem are laid out in Article 3(2) of the Constitution of Rwanda.

The previous emblem dated from the 1960s-the colors green, yellow and red represented peace; the nation's hope for future development; and the people. According to the state, the device and the flag itself were changed because they had become associated with the brutality of the Rwandan genocide. However, some Rwandans at the time expressed doubts about the stated reasoning and merely viewed all this as an attempt by the ruling Rwandan Patriotic Front to express its political power by changing the state's symbols.

== Gallery ==
Coat of arms of The German East Africa Company

Proposed Coat of arms of The German East Africa

Coat of arms of Ruanda-Urundi

Emblem of Ruanda under Ruanda-Urundi (c. 1920–1962)

Emblem of the Republic of Rwanda from 1962 to 2001

Lesser arms of pretenders to the Rwandan throne, designed in 2007

Full achievement of pretenders to the Rwandan throne, designed in 2007

State emblem claimed by pretenders to the Rwandan throne, designed in 2007
