= Cabinet of Rwanda =

Executive council of the Government of Rwanda

The Cabinet of Rwanda (Kinyarwanda: Inama y'Abaminisitiri) is the executive council of the Government of Rwanda. It is made up of the Prime Minister, ministers, ministers of state and other members appointed by the President.

Since July 2025, the Prime Minister has been Justin Nsengiyumva. The cabinet was last reshuffled in June 2026.

== Composition ==
Members of the cabinet are selected from political organisations based on the number of seats they hold in the Chamber of Deputies. Members of the cabinet cannot themselves belong to the Chamber.

== History ==
=== Gender balance ===
In 2018, half of the cabinet members were women. At the time, Rwanda and Ethiopia were the only two African countries with gender equality in their cabinets. In October 2018, President Paul Kagame reduced the number of cabinet members from 31 to 26.

=== Recent changes ===
Kagame won a new term in the July 2024 presidential election. He then named a cabinet of 21 ministers, most of them from the previous government.

In July 2025, Kagame appointed Justin Nsengiyumva as Prime Minister. Nsengiyumva replaced Édouard Ngirente, who had held the post since 2017. Nsengiyumva was sworn in on 25 July 2025. A new cabinet with four new members was appointed on 24 July 2025.

On 10 June 2026, Kagame appointed new ministers of infrastructure, of public service and labour, and of trade and industry. He also appointed two ministers of state for infrastructure.

== Members ==
As of October 2026, the cabinet is made up of the following members.

Office or ministry	Minister	Minister(s) of State
Office of the President	Paul Kagame (President)	—
Office of the Prime Minister	Justin Nsengiyumva (Prime Minister); Ines Mpambara (Minister in the Office of the Prime Minister)	—
Finance and Economic Planning (MINECOFIN)	Yusuf Murangwa	Godfrey Kabera (National Treasury); Mutesi Linda Rusagara (Resource Mobilisation and Public Investment)
Foreign Affairs and International Cooperation (MINAFFET)	Olivier Nduhungirehe	Usta Kaitesi
Justice (MINIJUST)	Emmanuel Ugirashebuja (also Attorney General)	—
Defence (MOD)	Juvenal Marizamunda	—
Interior (MININTER)	Vincent Biruta	—
Local Government (MINALOC)	Dominique Habimana	Marie-Solange Kayisire
National Unity and Civic Engagement (MINUBUMWE)	Jean-Damascène Bizimana	—
Public Service and Labour (MIFOTRA)	Judith Uwizeye	—
Infrastructure (MININFRA)	Damien Murwanashyaka	Armand Zingiro; Claudien Bizimungu
ICT and Innovation (MINICT)	Paula Ingabire	Yves Iradukunda
Trade and Industry (MINICOM)	Antoine-Marie Kajangwe	—
Agriculture and Animal Resources (MINAGRI)	Telesphore Ndabamenye	Solange Uwituze
Environment (MoE)	Bernadette Arakwiye	—
Emergency Management (MINEMA)	Albert Murasira	—
Education (MINEDUC)	Joseph Nsengimana	Claudette Irere
Health (MOH)	Sabin Nsanzimana	Yvan Butera
Gender and Family Promotion (MIGEPROF)	Consolée Uwimana	—
Youth and Arts (MoYA)	Jean Nepo Abdallah Utumatwishima	Sandrine Umutoni
Sports (MINISPORTS)	Nelly Mukazayire	Rwego Ngarambe
