= Elections in Rwanda =

Elections in Rwanda are manipulated in various ways, which include banning opposition parties, arresting or assassinating critics, and electoral fraud. According to its constitution, Rwanda is a multi-party democracy with a presidential system. In practice, it functions as a one-party state ruled by the Rwandan Patriotic Front and its leader Paul Kagame. The President and majority of members of the Chamber of Deputies are directly elected, whilst the Senate is indirectly elected and partly appointed.

== Latest election ==
=== Presidential ===
Candidate	Party	Votes	%
Paul Kagame	Rwandan Patriotic Front	8,822,794	99.18
Frank Habineza	Democratic Green Party	44,479	0.50
Philippe Mpayimana	Independent	28,466	0.32
Total		8,895,739	100.00
Valid votes		8,895,739	99.86
Invalid/blank votes		12,137	0.14
Total votes		8,907,876	100.00
Registered voters/turnout		9,071,157	98.20
Source: NEC

=== Chamber of Deputies ===
Party or alliance		Votes	%	Seats
RPF Coalition	Rwandan Patriotic Front	6,126,433	68.83	37
RPF Coalition	Centrist Democratic Party	6,126,433	68.83	37
RPF Coalition	Prosperity and Solidarity Party	6,126,433	68.83	37
RPF Coalition	Party for Progress and Concord	6,126,433	68.83	37
RPF Coalition	Democratic Union of the Rwandan People	6,126,433	68.83	37
RPF Coalition	Rwandan Socialist Party	6,126,433	68.83	37
Liberal Party		770,896	8.66	5
Social Democratic Party		767,143	8.62	5
Ideal Democratic Party		410,513	4.61	2
Democratic Green Party of Rwanda		405,893	4.56	2
Social Party Imberakuri		401,524	4.51	2
Independents		19,051	0.21	0
Indirectly-elected members				27
Total		8,901,453	100.00	80
Valid votes		8,901,453	99.93	
Invalid/blank votes		6,423	0.07	
Total votes		8,907,876	100.00	
Registered voters/turnout		9,071,157	98.20	
Source: NEC

== Electoral history ==
=== Pre-independence ===
The Decree of 14 July 1952 by the Belgian colonial authorities introduced an element of democracy to the Rwandan political system. A complicated electoral system was created, which involved several stages of elections to eventually elect the national Superior Council; notables elected Sub-Chiefdom Councils; sub-chiefs and notables elected Chiefdom Councils; sub-chiefs and Chiefdom Council members elected Territorial Councils, with chiefs and Territorial Councils electing the Superior Council member. Elections were held under this system in 1953–54 and 1956–57.

The first direct elections in Rwanda were held in September 1961, with MDR-Parmehutu winning 35 of the 44 seats in the Legislative Assembly.

=== Post-independence ===
Following independence in 1962 the country became a one-party state with MDR-Parmehutu as the sole legal party. General elections were held in 1965 in which Grégoire Kayibanda was re-elected President unopposed, whilst the party won all 47 seats in the National Assembly; in the presidential elections voters could vote for or against Kayibanda's candidacy, whilst in the National Assembly elections voters could approve the entire MDR-Parmehutu list or give a preferential vote to one candidate. The 1969 elections were held under the same system with the same result.

Following a 1973 coup, the next presidential elections were held in 1978, in which voters could vote for or against the candidacy of coup leader Juvénal Habyarimana; 99% voted in favour. Parliamentary elections were delayed until 1981 and saw the National Republican Movement for Democracy and Development (MRND), the sole legal party, win all 64 seats. Habyarimana was re-elected with 99.97% of the vote in 1983, with parliamentary elections a week later seeing the MRND win all 70 seats. Habyarimana was re-elected again in 1988, this time with 99.98% of the vote, whilst the MRND won all 70 seats again in the parliamentary elections the following week.

Due to the Rwandan Civil War and the subsequent genocide, the next elections were not held until 2003, by which time the country had reverted to being a multi-party democracy. Paul Kagame of the Rwandan Patriotic Front (RPF) was re-elected as president in August 2003 with 95% of the vote, whilst the RPF-led coalition won 40 of the 53 elected seats in the September 2003 parliamentary elections. The coalition won 42 seats in the 2008 parliamentary elections, with Kagame re-elected again in 2010 with 93% of the vote. The RPF coalition retained its majority in the 2013 parliamentary elections, winning 41 seats.

== Electoral system ==
The voting age in Rwanda is 18.

=== President ===
The President of Rwanda is elected in one round of voting by plurality.

=== Chamber of Deputies ===
The 80 members of the Chamber of Deputies consisted of 53 directly elected members elected by proportional representation in a single nationwide constituency, 24 women elected by electoral colleges formed in the provinces (six from Eastern, Southern and Western, four from Northern and two from Kigali) and three members elected by mini-committees, two representing youth (elected by the National Youth Council) and one representing disabled people (elected by the Federation of the Associations of the Disabled.

=== Senate ===
The Senate has 26 members, of which 14 are indirectly elected and 12 are appointed. The 14 indirectly elected members consist of 12 members elected by local councils and two university lecturers elected by university staff. The 12 appointed members include eight appointed by the President and four appointed by the Forum of Political Organisations.

=== Local elections ===
Elections are established at every tier of local government, except the provincial level, where the Governor is appointed by the national government. Elections are only direct elections by the citizens at the cell level. Members of sector and district councils are elected indirectly from the level below, with reserved seats for representatives of the interest groups of women and of youth. No candidate at local elections can claim partisan affiliation.

== Referendums ==
Four national referendums have been held in Rwanda; the first in 1961 decided the future of the monarchy, with 80% voting in favour of abolishing it. A constitutional referendum in 1978 introduced a constitution that made the National Revolutionary Movement for Development the sole legal party, and was approved by 89% of voters. Another new constitution was introduced following a 2003 referendum in which it was approved by 93% of voters. A fourth referendum in 2015 saw amendments to presidential term limits and length approved by 98% of voters.

== See also ==
- Censorship in Rwanda
- Democracy in Africa
