= List of political parties in Rwanda =

This article lists political parties in Rwanda. Rwanda is a one-party-dominant state with the Rwandan Patriotic Front in power. Opposition parties are allowed, but are widely considered to have no real chance of gaining power.

== Active parties ==
=== Parties represented in the Chamber of Deputies ===
Party		Abbr.	Leader	Political position	Ideology	Chamber seats
RPF; Coalition	Rwandan Patriotic Front; Ishyaka FPR-Inkotanyi; Front patriotique rwandais	RPF–Inkotanyi; FPR–Inkotanyi	Paul Kagame	Big tent	Rwandan nationalism; Economic liberalism	37 / 80
RPF; Coalition	Centrist Democratic Party; Ishyaka Riraranira Demokrasi Ihuza Abanyarwanda; Parti démocrate centriste	CDP; PDC	Agnes Mukabaranga	Centre-right	Christian democracy	1 / 80
RPF; Coalition	Party for Progress and Concord; Ishyaka ry’Iterambere n'Ubusabane; Parti pour le progrès et la concorde	PPC	Alivera Mukabaramba			1 / 80
RPF; Coalition	Democratic Union of the Rwandan People; Ishyaka Riharanira Ubumwe bw'Abanyarwanda na Demokarasi; Union démocratique du peuple rwandais	UDPR				1 / 80
Social Democratic Party; Ishiyaka Riharanira Demokrasi n'Imibereho Myiza y’Abaturage; Parti social démocrate		PSD	Vincent Biruta	Centre-left	Social democracy	5 / 80
Liberal Party; Ishyaka ry’Ukwishyira Ukizana; Parti libéral		PL	Prosper Higiro	Centre	Liberalism	5 / 80
Ideal Democratic Party; Ishyaka Ntangarugero Muri Demokrasi; Parti démocratique idéal		IDP; PDI	Mussa Fazil Harerimana		Islamic democracy	2 / 80
Social Party Imberakuri; Ishyaka ry’Imberakuri Riharanira Imibereho Myiza; Parti social imberakuri		PS–Imberakuri	Bernard Ntaganda	Centre-left	Social democracy	2 / 80
Democratic Green Party of Rwanda; Ishyaka Riharanira Demokarasi no Kurengera Ibidukikije; Parti vert démocratique du Rwanda		PVDR	Frank Habineza	Centre to centre-left	Green politics; Liberal democracy	2 / 80

=== Illegal parties ===
Flag	Party	Abbr.	Leader	Political position	Ideology
	Democratic Forces for the Liberation of Rwanda; Ingabo za demokarasi zo kubohoza u Rwanda; Forces Démocratiques de Libération du Rwanda	FDLR	Callixte Mbarushimana	Right-wing to far-right	Hutu Power
	United Democratic Forces of Rwanda; Forces Democratiques Unifiées du Rwanda	UDF-Inkigi	Pierre Celestin Rwarinda	Centre to centre-left	Liberal Democracy; Egalitarianism; Green Politics; Anti-Racism; Anti-Fascism; Anti-Authoritarianism; Anti-Kagame; Decentralization
	Republican Democratic Movement; Mouvement démocratique républicain	MDR		Right-wing to far-right	Hutu interests Hutu Power
	Rwanda National Congress; Ihuriro Nyarwanda; Congrès national rwandais	RNC	Faustin Rukundo	Centre Anti-Kagame	

== Former parties ==
- National Republican Movement for Democracy and Development
- Coalition for the Defence of the Republic
- Rwandese National Union

== See also ==
- Politics of Rwanda
- List of political parties by country
