= LGBTQ rights in Rwanda =

- Rwanda
- Legal status: Legal
- Gender identity: No
- Military: No
- Discrimination protections: Limited protections

Family rights
- Recognition of relationships: No recognition of same-sex relationships
- Adoption: No

Lesbian, gay, bisexual, transgender, and queer (LGBTQ) people in Rwanda face legal challenges not experienced by non-LGBTQ residents. While neither homosexuality nor homosexual acts are illegal in the country, homosexuality is considered a taboo topic, and there is no significant public discussion of this issue in any region of the country and LGBTQ people still face stigmatization among the broader population. No anti-discrimination laws are afforded to LGBTQ citizens, and same-sex marriages are not recognized by the state, as the Constitution of Rwanda provides that "[o]nly civil monogamous marriage between a man and a woman is recognized". LGBTQ Rwandans have reported being harassed, blackmailed, and even arrested by the police under various laws dealing with public order and morality.

Rwanda is a signatory of the United Nations joint statement condemning violence against LGBTQ people and is one of only a few countries in Africa to have sponsored the declaration, and in this respect stands in sharp contrast with neighbouring Uganda, Tanzania and Burundi.

== History ==
=== Kingdom of Rwanda ===
In the old Kingdom of Rwanda, male homosexual relations were common among young Hutus and Tutsis. In 1986, a 19-year-old Tutsi man was recorded as saying that "traditionally, in his tribe, there was an extended period during which boys lived apart from the rest of the village while they are training to be warriors, during which very emotional, and often sexual, relationships were struck up... Sometimes these relationships lasted beyond adolescence into adulthood. Watusi still have a reputation for bisexuality in the cities of East Africa." Tutsi boys training at court would often be made sexually available to guests. Homosexuals were referred to as umuswezi or umukonotsi, which literally translate to "sodomite". Several terms exist for male homosexuality: kuswerana nk'imbwa, kunonoka, kwitomba, kuranana inyuma and ku'nyo. In addition, there were traditions of "cross-dressing priests", known as ikihindu or ikimaze, first described by the colonialists as "hermaphrodites", who would play the role of shamans and healers. Sexual relations are believed to have included mutual masturbation, intercrural sex and anal intercourse.

Societal acceptance quickly disappeared after the arrival of the European colonialists and Christianity.

=== Republic of Rwanda ===
On 16 December 2009, the Parliament of Rwanda debated whether to make homosexuality a criminal offense, with a punishment of 5–10 years imprisonment. This legislation was similar to the controversial anti-homosexuality bill in the neighboring country of Uganda. Justice Minister Tharcisse Karugarama, however, condemned and refuted reports that the government intended to criminalize homosexual acts, saying that sexual orientation is a private matter, not a state business.

== Legality of same-sex sexual activity ==
Same-sex sexual activity is legal in Rwanda. The age of consent is 18, regardless of sexual orientation or gender.

== Recognition of same-sex relationships ==
Rwanda does not recognize same-sex marriages, civil unions or similar unions. Most gay people who have been interviewed stated that they are not open about their sexuality to their family for fear of being rejected.

The Constitution of Rwanda, adopted in May 2003, defines marriage as a union between a man and a woman. Article 26 states: "Only civil monogamous marriage between a man and a woman is recognized." (Note: In Kinyarwanda: Ubushyingiranwe bw'umugabo umwe n'umugore umwe bukorewe mu butegetsi bwa Leta ni bwo bwonyine bwemewe. In French: Seul le mariage monogamique civil entre un homme et une femme est reconnu.)

== Discrimination protections ==
There are some limited protections based on sexual orientation, sexual life and gender identity.

- The Human Resource Management Policy (2015) issued by the Office of the Auditor General of State Finances states "Harassment is commonly related to prohibited grounds of discrimination, such as gender, race, disability, sexual orientation, age, and religion.
- The Code of Conduct of the Public Private Partnership Guidelines (2018) bans discrimination against any bidder on the grounds of sexual orientation.
- The Patients Rights and Responsibilities Policy (2018) issued by the Ministry of Health states: "All Rwandans, regardless of gender, sexual orientation, age, religion, cultural belief, or disability are equally entitled to receive health services to promote and maintain good health. Whether the services are being offered through the public, private or NGO sector, every Rwandan has certain rights which cannot be taken away."
- Law 058/2021 relating to the Protection of Personal Data and Privacy protects a person’s sexual life as sensitive personal data.

In 2024, some immigration and asylum protections were issued by the Government. In April 2022, a transgender claimant was granted refugee status.

- Standard Operating Procedures on identifying and safeguarding vulnerable persons under the Migration and Economic Development Partnership (2024), states that "Vulnerable Persons" are "Individuals whose gender identity and/or sexual orientation places them at higher risk of vulnerability such as lesbian, gay, bisexual, and transgender (LGBT) persons."
- Asylum and humanitarian protection decision making Standard Operating Procedures (2024), states that "Interviews are conducted under conditions which allow the individual to present the grounds of their application in a comprehensive manner. In particular: a) trained interviewer takes into account the personal and general circumstances surrounding the application, including the applicant’s cultural origin, gender and any other circumstance including, sexual orientation, gender identity or vulnerability."
- Manual on Refugee Appeal Tribunal Standard Operating Procedures (2014), states that "hearings shall be conducted in a way which takes account of the personal and general circumstances surrounding the application, including the appellant’s cultural origin, gender, sexual orientation, gender identity or vulnerability."

== Government and politics ==
=== Political parties ===
Under Rwandan electoral laws, most of the political parties are aligned with, if not an extension of, the ruling party. The four Rwandan political parties that are not a part of the ruling coalition, the Liberal Party, the Social Democratic Party, the Social Party Imberakuri and the Democratic Green Party of Rwanda, have not taken an official position on LGBTQ rights.

In September 2016, speaking in San Francisco, President Paul Kagame said that "it (homosexuality) hasn't been our problem. And we don't intend to make it our problem".

=== Human rights ===
Since 2005, the Horizons Community Association of Rwanda has been doing some public advocacy on behalf of LGBTQ rights, although its members have often been harassed by the government.

The Constitution of Rwanda provides important civil rights regarding nondiscrimination, it does not ban discrimination based on sexual orientation or gender identity. The relevant sections are articles 15 and 16:

=== Article 15. Equality before the law ===
All persons are equal before the law. They are entitled to equal protection of the law.

=== Article 16. Protection from discrimination ===
All Rwandans are born and remain equal in rights and freedoms.

Discrimination of any kind or its propaganda based on, inter alia, ethnic origin, family or ancestry, clan, skin colour or race, sex, region, economic categories, religion or faith, opinion, fortune, cultural differences, language, economic status, physical or mental disability or any other form of discrimination are prohibited and punishable by law.

== Society and culture ==
The U.S. Department of State's Country Reports on Human Rights Practices for 2016 stated that:

Acts of Violence, Discrimination, and Other Abuses Based on Sexual Orientation and Gender Identity
There are no laws that criminalize sexual orientation or consensual same-sex sexual conduct, and cabinet-level government officials expressed support for the rights of lesbian, gay, bisexual, transgender, and intersex (LGBTI) persons. LGBTI persons reported societal discrimination and abuse, and LGBTI rights groups reported occasional harassment by neighbors and police. There were no known reports of physical attacks against LGBTI persons, nor were there any reports of LGBTI persons fleeing the country due to harassment or attack.

In 2007, the Anglican Church of Rwanda condemned "the non-biblical behaviors" of the Western churches and insisted that they would not support the ordination of LGBTQ clergy.

In September 2019, Albert Nabonibo, a well-known gospel singer, came out as gay in an interview with a Christian YouTube channel. The Associated Press reported that his coming out had caused "shock" in a country "where such a public assertion of homosexuality is unheard of". Despite "horrible" reactions from family and friends, Olivier Nduhungirehe, the Minister of State for East African Community Affairs, expressed support for Nabonibo, saying, "All Rwandans are born and remain equal in rights and freedoms." Nabonibo himself stated that "there is no going back, because I have to live my real life."

== Transgender rights ==
Transgender Rwandans face legal challenges. Rwandan law forbids changing legal gender. While crossdressing is not de jure illegal in Rwanda, transgender people are often charged with unrelated offenses and can face violent detention.

== Summary table ==
Same-sex sexual activity legal	Yes (Always legal)
Equal age of consent (18)	Yes
Anti-discrimination laws in hate speech and violence	Yes / No Limited protections
Anti-discrimination laws in employment	No
Anti-discrimination laws in the provision of goods and services	No
Same-sex marriage	No (Constitutional ban since 2003)
Recognition of same-sex couples	No
Stepchild adoption by same-sex couples	No
Joint adoption by same-sex couples	No
LGBTQ people allowed to serve openly in the military	Yes (Don't Ask, Don't Tell)
Right to change legal gender	No
Access to IVF for lesbians	No
Commercial surrogacy for gay male couples	No
MSMs allowed to donate blood	No

== See also ==
- Human rights in Rwanda
- LGBTQ rights in Africa
