= 2024 Rwandan general election =

- 15 July 2024
- Presidential election
- Registered: 9,071,157
- Turnout: 98.20% (▲0.05pp)
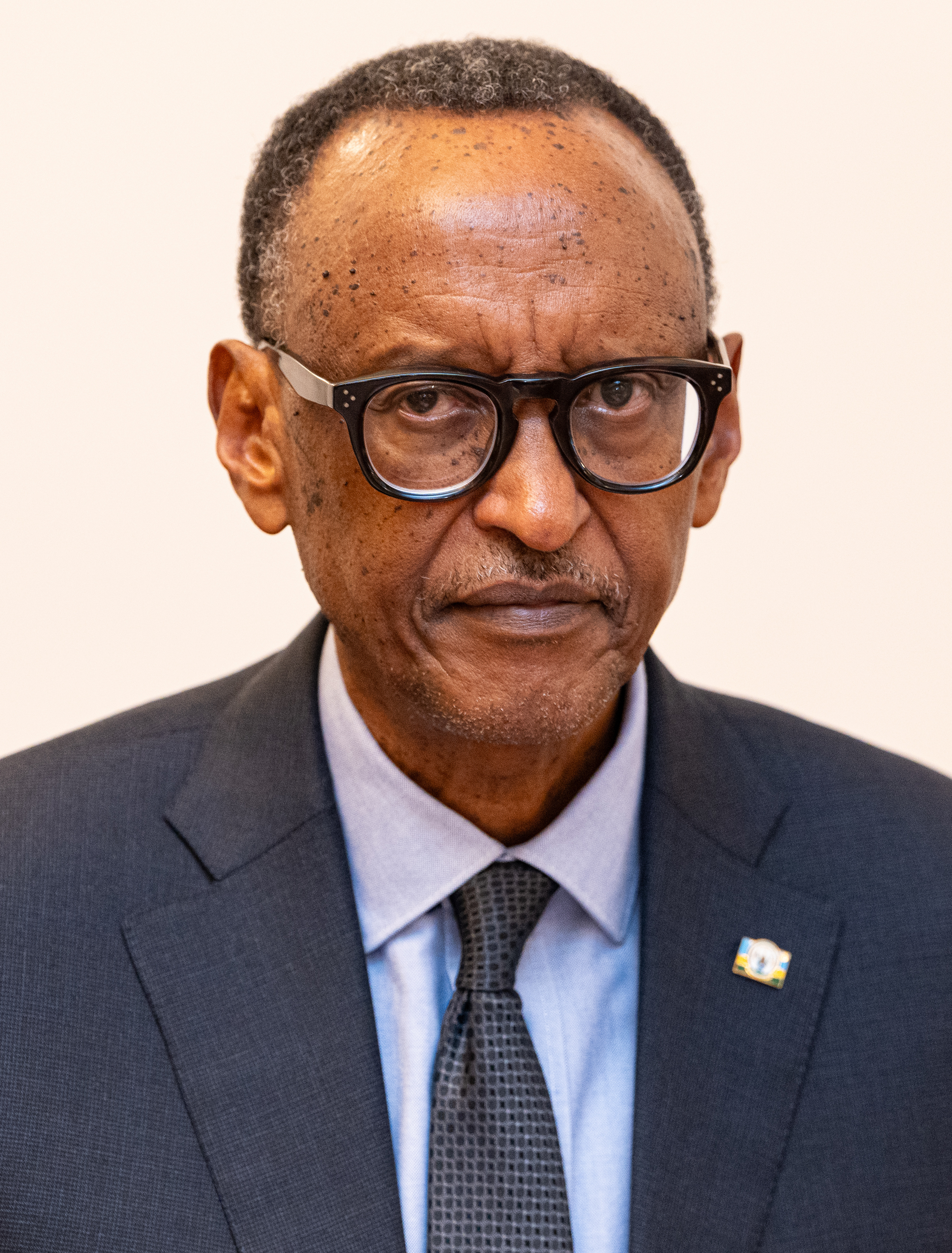

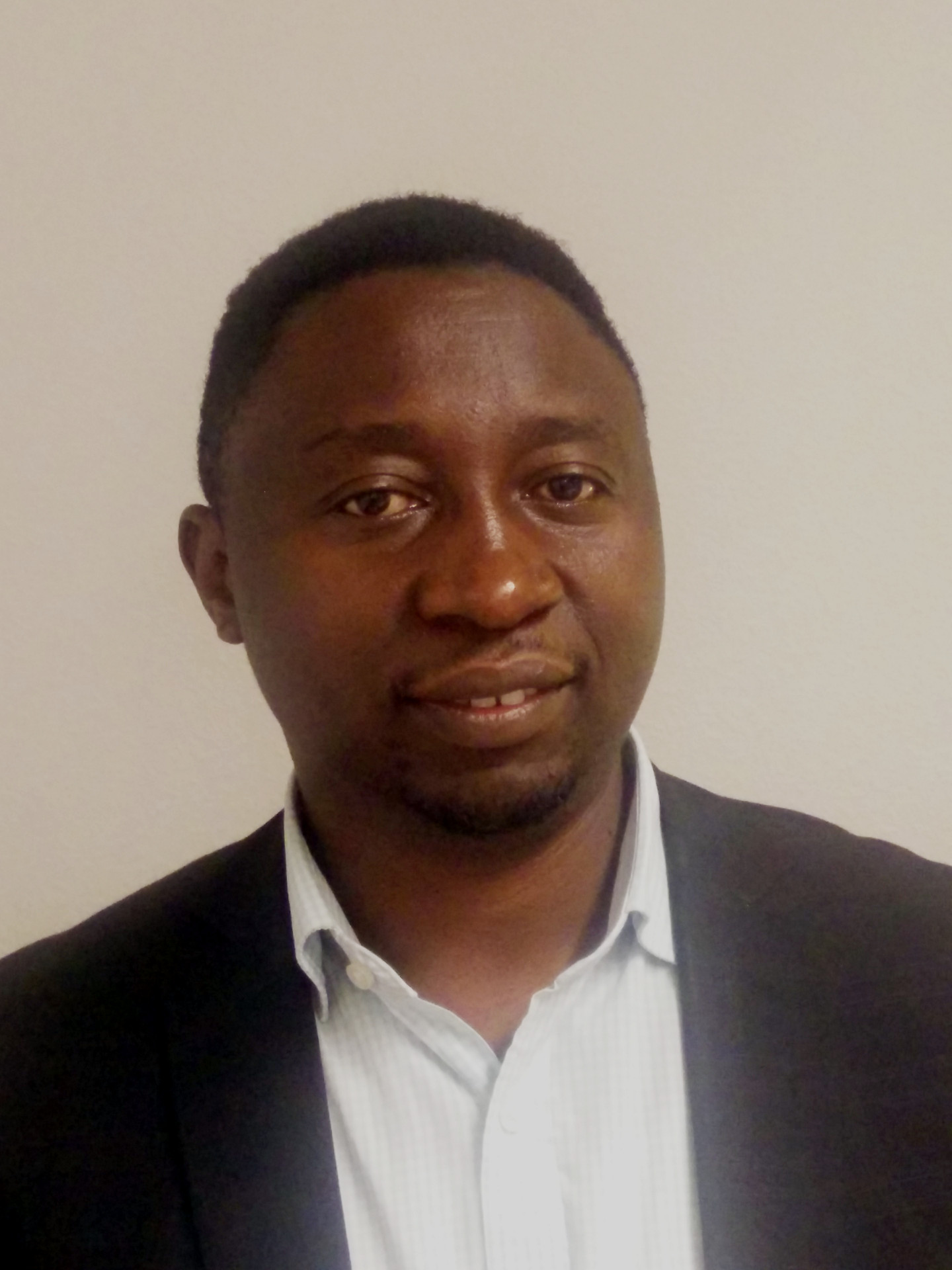
Nominee	Paul Kagame	Frank Habineza
Party	RPF	Democratic Green
Popular vote	8,822,794	44,479
Percentage	99.18%	0.50%
- Results by district Kagame: >95%
President before election
Paul Kagame
RPF
Elected President
Paul Kagame
RPF
- Chamber of Deputies election
- 53 of the 80 seats in the Chamber of Deputies
Party	Leader	Vote %	Seats	+/–
RPF coalition	Paul Kagame	68.83	37	−2
PL	Donatille Mukabalisa	8.66	5	+1
PSD	Vincent Biruta	8.62	5	0
PDI	Mussa Fazil Harerimana	4.61	2	+1
Democratic Green	Frank Habineza	4.56	2	0
PS-Imberakuri	Christine Mukabunani	4.51	2	0
This lists parties that won seats. See the complete results below.

General elections were held in Rwanda on 15 July 2024 to elect the president and members of the Chamber of Deputies.

In an election that was criticised as unfair for its barring of serious opposition candidates, incumbent President Paul Kagame, in office since 2000, was elected to a fourth term (allegedly with over 99% of the vote and a 98.2% turnout) and was inaugurated on 11 August.

== Background ==
A referendum in 2015 approved constitutional amendments that would allow incumbent President Paul Kagame to run for a third term in office in 2017, as well as shortening presidential terms from seven to five years, although the latter change would not come into effect until 2024. In 2022 Kagame told France 24 that he intended to run for president again in the 2024 election, despite having already served three terms in office.

Kagame's rule in the country has been described as authoritarian. According to Freedom House, Kagame is an autocrat who is responsible for "surveillance, intimidation, torture and renditions or suspected assassinations of exiled dissidents". Human Rights Watch says that Kagame's government arrested and threatened political opponents. Freedom House considered the elections in Rwanda neither free nor fair, citing reports of ballot stuffing, political intimidation, blocking of opposition challengers, and other undemocratic practices.

== Electoral system ==
The president of Rwanda is elected in one round of voting by plurality.

The 80-seat Chamber of Deputies is elected by two methods:

- 53 seats directly elected by closed list proportional representation in a single nationwide constituency with an electoral threshold of 5%; seats are allocated using the largest remainder method.
- 27 seats indirectly elected by local and national councils
  - 24 reserved for women
    - Six from the Eastern, Southern and Western provinces
    - Four from Northern Province
    - Two from Kigali
  - Two for representatives of youth
  - One for representatives of people with disabilities.

Around 9.5 million people were registered to vote. Advance voting for overseas Rwandans was held in the country's diplomatic missions on 14 July. Polling on election day opened at 07:00 and lasted until 15:00, while voting for indirectly elected seats was held on 16 July. Provisional results were expected by 20 July, while the final result was expected on 27 July.

== Presidential candidates ==
Kagame announced his bid for a fourth term on 20 September 2023 in an interview with the pan-African Jeune Afrique magazine, saying "I am happy with the confidence that the Rwandans have shown in me. I will always serve them, as much when I can. Yes, I am indeed a candidate." Kagame's campaign was endorsed by member parties of Rwanda's ruling government coalition, the Rwandan Patriotic Front (RPF), including the Ideal Democratic Party, the Democratic Union of the Rwandan People, the Prosperity and Solidarity Party, and the Rwandan Socialist Party. Kagame's candidacy was finalised by the RPF without objections at the end of its congress on 9 March 2024. He was also endorsed by the Liberal Party and the Social Democratic Party on 31 March.

Frank Habineza of the Democratic Green Party of Rwanda also indicated he would run again in 2024. He had previously run in 2017.

In 2019, activist Victoire Ingabire Umuhoza stated that her United Democratic Forces party would challenge Kagame if it was officially recognised by the government. She claimed that there were delays despite her party having the necessary amount of registered members. She said in 2023 that while recognising Kagame's achievements while President, his greatest achievement would be stepping aside to let a peaceful transfer of power take place. However, Ingabire had been convicted in 2010 for threatening state security and downplaying the Rwandan genocide by asking why no Hutu victims were included in an official memorial. She was thus barred from running on 13 March 2024.

On 7 June the Rwandan electoral commission confirmed Paul Kagame, Frank Habineza and Philippe Mpayimana, an independent, as the final candidates for the presidential election, the same three candidates as in 2017. The applications of six other candidates, including Diane Rwigara of the People Salvation Movement, were rejected. The final list of candidates for the presidential and parliamentary election was released on 14 June. The only three presidential candidates allowed to run were the same as from 2017, where Kagame won with more than 98% of the vote. DW described the election as a "re-run of the non-contest in 2017." The Independent wrote that the election was "widely criticised as unfair", while Amnesty International criticised the censorship of opposition in the race as having "a chilling effect and limits the space for debate for people of Rwanda".

== Campaign ==
Campaigning was held from 22 June to 12 July. Kagame pledged to continue his policies upon reelection. Habineza criticised censorship and arbitrary detentions under Kagame, and pledged to increase access to water and expand mechanised farming. Mpayimana pledged to reform the mining sector to benefit small-scale miners and expand access to loans for university students, and said that his campaign was also aimed at promoting "political maturity" in the country.

== Conduct ==
On 23 June, at an electoral rally attended by Kagame in Rubavu, a crowd crush killed one and injured 37.

== Results ==
=== President ===
Candidate	Party	Votes	%
Paul Kagame	Rwandan Patriotic Front	8,822,794	99.18
Frank Habineza	Democratic Green Party	44,479	0.50
Philippe Mpayimana	Independent	28,466	0.32
Total		8,895,739	100.00
Valid votes		8,895,739	99.86
Invalid/blank votes		12,137	0.14
Total votes		8,907,876	100.00
Registered voters/turnout		9,071,157	98.20
Source: NEC

=== Chamber of Deputies ===
Party or alliance		Votes	%	Seats
RPF Coalition	Rwandan Patriotic Front	6,126,433	68.83	37
RPF Coalition	Centrist Democratic Party	6,126,433	68.83	37
RPF Coalition	Prosperity and Solidarity Party	6,126,433	68.83	37
RPF Coalition	Party for Progress and Concord	6,126,433	68.83	37
RPF Coalition	Democratic Union of the Rwandan People	6,126,433	68.83	37
RPF Coalition	Rwandan Socialist Party	6,126,433	68.83	37
Liberal Party		770,896	8.66	5
Social Democratic Party		767,143	8.62	5
Ideal Democratic Party		410,513	4.61	2
Democratic Green Party of Rwanda		405,893	4.56	2
Social Party Imberakuri		401,524	4.51	2
Independents		19,051	0.21	0
Indirectly-elected members				27
Total		8,901,453	100.00	80
Valid votes		8,901,453	99.93	
Invalid/blank votes		6,423	0.07	
Total votes		8,907,876	100.00	
Registered voters/turnout		9,071,157	98.20	
Source: NEC

== Aftermath ==
Kagame thanked voters over the result in a speech at RPF headquarters in Kigali.
