= 2010 Rwandan presidential election =

- 9 August 2010
- Registered: 5,718,492
- Turnout: 88.30% (▼8.25pp)
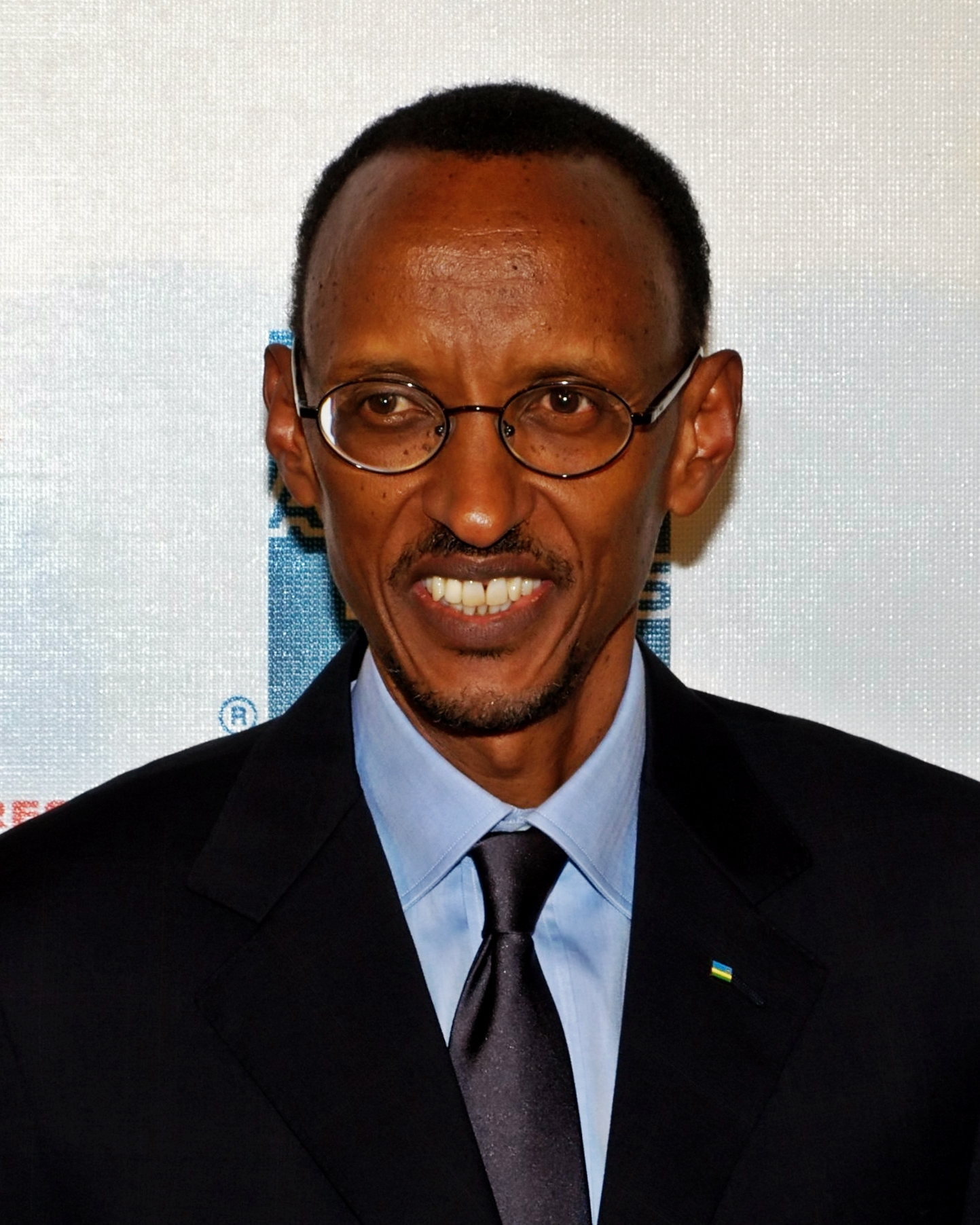

Nominee	Paul Kagame	Jean-Damascène Ntawukuriryayo
Party	RPF	PSD
Popular vote	4,638,560	256,488
Percentage	93.08%	5.15%
- Results by province Kagame: 90-95% >95%
President before election
Paul Kagame
RPF
Elected President
Paul Kagame
RPF

Presidential elections were held in Rwanda on 9 August 2010, the second since the Rwandan Civil War. Incumbent President Paul Kagame of the Rwandan Patriotic Front (RPF) was re-elected for a second seven-year term with 93% of the vote.

== Background ==
Paul Kagame, leader of the RPF, had been President since 2000 and de facto leader since 1994, following his forces' victory over the interim government at the end of the Rwandan Genocide. A new constitution was approved by a referendum in 2003, mandating a seven-year presidential term of office. Presidential elections were held shortly after the referendum and the promulgation of the constitution, which were won by Kagame. Having served one term, Kagame was entitled to serve for one further term and sought re-election in 2010.

During Kagame's first term, Rwanda experienced high growth rates and a rise in infrastructure and international investment and tourism. However, he was criticised by some opposition figures and human rights groups for suppressing dissent in the period leading up to the elections.

== Candidates ==
The election campaign began publicly in January 2010 when Victoire Ingabire, a Hutu who had been living abroad for some years, returned to Rwanda and announced her candidacy. Ingabire caused some controversy following her arrival with comments relating to the genocide. The government accused her of breaking the country's strict laws regarding genocide denial, resulting in her arrest in April 2010. She was released on bail, but was prohibited from running in the elections. She was later sentenced to 15 years in prison.

In May, Kagame was officially endorsed as the RPF's candidate at the party's national congress. Kagame then became the first candidate to be accepted when he presented his electoral papers in July. The next candidate to register was Vice-President of the Chamber of Deputies and former Minister of Health Jean-Damascène Ntawukuriryayo, who won the nomination for the Social Democratic Party on 22 May. In June, the Liberal Party named its candidate, with Vice-President of the Senate and former Minister of Commerce Prosper Higiro defeating Stephanie Mukantagara for the nomination after the latter pulled out of the race at the last minute. The final candidate to successfully register was Senator Alvera Mukabaramba of the Party for Progress and Concord.

Two of three other contenders failed to get official documents approved and were not accepted into the race, whilst the other party was said to have effectively disintegrated, leaving no real opposition to Kagame. The three candidates running against Kagame had supported him in the 2003 election and were described by other parties as the RPF's "political satellites" – token opposition used to maintain a façade of pluralism.

== Conduct ==
The run-up to the elections saw the "killings of opposition figures," including the unsolved beheading of the vice-president of the Democratic Green Party, André Kagwa Rwisereka, whilst the murder of journalist Jean-Léonard Rugambage, sparked concern and prompted the United Nations to demand an investigation. The BBC described the electoral campaign as "marred by violence and intimidation against opposition politicians." Burkinabé newspaper Le Pays – in an article relayed by the Courrier International – condemned the killing of "those who might disturb Paul Kagame's reelection," and called on the international community to take a hard stance against the Kagame government. Amnesty International also condemned the attacks and called on the government to ensure an atmosphere for Rwandans to "freely express their views," where the killing had created a climate of repression to inhibit freedom of expression. "In recent months, killings, arrests and the closure of newspapers and broadcasters has reinforced a climate of fear. The Rwandan government must ensure that investigations into the killings are thorough and reinstate closed media outlets."

In June, Rwanda was also embroiled in controversy after freeing an American lawyer, who worked with the Tanzania-based International Criminal Tribunal for Rwanda, and was arrested and charged with "genocide denial and threatening state security."

South Africa also recalled its ambassador to Rwanda to discuss the situation in the country the week before the elections. This came about two months after a dissident Rwandan general survived an assassination attempt in Johannesburg. General Faustin Kayumba Nyamwasa, who was a critic of Kagame, alleged that it was an assassination attempt, a charge Rwanda denied. Days later, a journalist who claimed to have uncovered the regime's responsibility in the attempted murder was shot dead. After South Africa arrested five men over the shooting and revealed their nationalities, Rwanda summoned the South African ambassador to express concern about the investigation. However, South Africa denied the recall was in "making any connections between the government of Rwanda and the shooting of the general."

Opposition parties also said more than 30 newspapers had been banned. Amnesty International also said opposition party figures had been intimidated, journalists had been targeted and killed, and several senior officers critical of the ruling party attacked and arrested. Foreign Minister Louise Mushikiwabo refuted the claims saying "The international media and human rights groups are misrepresenting what is happening in the country. My government does not stand to gain from any actions of insecurity. Paul Kagame happens to be a very popular candidate. I think to point a finger at this government is wrong. Anyone who is reading the situation from Rwanda would know that there is an atmosphere of excitement among the public."

Anil K Gayan, a former foreign minister of Mauritius and the head of the AU monitoring delegation, said "We have not received any evidence of intimidation." He also talked about the turnout for the elections saying that though political rallies may have been well attended "Crowds do not necessarily translate into votes." Kagame also refuted opposition claims and said the vote was "very democratic. The people of Rwanda were free to stand for election, those who wanted to, and to qualify, so I see no problem. Some sections of the media seem to be reading from a different page."

=== Violence ===
Although the election campaign was mostly conducted peacefully, there have been a number of incidents which attracted international attention. From February to March 2010, there were a series of attacks in Kigali, killing one person and injuring several, which were linked to the upcoming election. This and other bombings in the country were attributed to the Hutu-dominated Interhamwe and the exiled former Rwandan ambassador to India, General Faustin Kayumba Nyamwasa.

== Results ==
Kagame was declared the winner of the elections, according to results released by the National Electoral Commission on 11 August. However, opposition and human rights groups said the elections were tainted by repression, murder and lack of credible competition. Kagame responded saying "I see no problems, but there are some people who choose to see problems where there are not." Observers also criticised the poll because the campaign was devoid of "critical opposition voices" with the three other candidates standing in the poll linked to Kagame's party.

Candidate	Party	Votes	%
Paul Kagame	Rwandan Patriotic Front	4,638,560	93.08
Jean-Damascène Ntawukuriryayo	Social Democratic Party	256,488	5.15
Prosper Higiro	Liberal Party	68,235	1.37
Alvera Mukabaramba	Party for Progress and Concord	20,107	0.40
Total		4,983,390	100.00
Valid votes		4,983,390	98.69
Invalid/blank votes		65,912	1.31
Total votes		5,049,302	100.00
Registered voters/turnout		5,718,492	88.30
Source: Psephos

== Aftermath ==
A grenade attack occurred in Kigali hours after the election commission announced Kagame's victory, injuring about 20 people. Media reports indicated the attack may have been politically motivated and connected to earlier attacks in the same area.

In the months after the elections, arrests of opposition figures continued. Victoire Ingabire Umuhoza, the leader of the United Democratic Forces, was arrested on the basis of statements made by a former military officer that she had a connection with an alleged plot to form a "terrorist group." This came after she was already under judicial control.
