= Censorship in Rwanda =

Since the conclusion of the Rwandan Civil War, the Rwandan Government has introduced various forms of censorship, primarily political, aimed at controlling dissent, managing public discourse, and shaping narratives.

== General information control ==
Article 38 of the Constitution of Rwanda 2003 guarantees "the freedom of expression and freedom of access to information where it does not prejudice public order, good morals, the protection of the youth and children, the right of every citizen to honour and dignity and protection of personal and family privacy." However, in reality, this has not guaranteed freedom of speech or expression given that the government has declared many forms of speech fall into the exceptions. Under these exceptions, longtime Rwandan president, Paul Kagame, asserted that any acknowledgment of the separate people was detrimental to the unification of post-Genocide Rwanda and has created numerous laws to prevent Rwandans from promoting a "genocide ideology" and "divisionism." However, the law does not explicitly define such terms, nor does it define that one's beliefs must be spoken. For example, the law defines divisionism as ‘the use of any speech, written statement, or action that divides people, that is likely to spark conflicts among people, or that causes an uprising which might degenerate into strife among people based on discrimination'. Fear of the possible ramifications from breaking these laws have caused a culture of self-censorship within the population. Both civilians and the press typically avoid anything that could be construed as critical of the government/military or promoting "divisionism."

== Information control in the media ==
Article 34 of the Rwandan constitution states that "freedom of the press and freedom of information are recognized and guaranteed by the state"; however, the constitution does not in practice prevent media restrictions. In response to the effects of the radio broadcasts in encouraging the genocide, in the years following the genocide, Rwanda's government imposed strict guidelines for freedom of speech and press in relation to the genocide and the Hutu and Tutsi ideologues. Kagame proposed that these laws were necessary for retaining national unity and protecting against future genocide. These strict media laws have translated into banning government criticism and restricting freedom of speech. Furthermore, the country's broad definition of the limits of free speech has allowed for police to make their own interpretations of the law and exile journalists as the government pleases. According to the Committee to Protect Journalists (CPJ), the government threatens journalists who investigate or criticize the government. The CPJ proposed that these threats and the possible jail sentences cause journalists to self censor, even beyond what would normally be censored by the government.

Rwandan journalists are required to obtain licenses from the government controlled Rwanda Utilities Regulatory Authority (RURA). Article 34, along with the bans on speech that includes genocide ideology and divisionism, has commonly been used as a method for revoking journalists licenses. Commonly, these laws are used to block opposition voices such as when the government blocked Inyenyeri News, The Rwandan, and Le Prophete. In a documentary, BBC mentioned that a significant number of Hutus were killed and discussed theories of the RPF shooting down the president's plane. In response to the documentary, the Rwandan government shut down BBC in the local to BBC promoting a "revisionist" position on the genocide in a documentary.

== Information control in education ==
While before the genocide, Rwandan history textbooks would acknowledge and highlight differences between Tutsi and Hutu people, today, the only government approved Rwandan history textbook stresses the Rwandans as one people and virtually ignore the ethnic differences and pre-genocide conflicts. Furthermore, both many Rwandan people and international scholars feel that the teaching of the genocide does not properly teach students the entire story of the genocide. In 2016, Rwanda introduced a curriculum that hoped to bring more balanced discussion to the topic of the genocide, however, the Rwandan laws relating the "divisionism" and "genocide ideology" still limit the scope of such discussion. Teachers are reported to fear the repercussions from discussing the genocide in a non-approved way and self-censor opinions under these rules.

== Information control in politics ==
Since taking office, Kagame has implemented information and media controls to prevent the spread of dissent, including threatening and imprisoning journalists and political opponents for breaking his rules or disrespecting his government and military. Kagame's censorship of access to independent media and human rights organizations that do not support his administration has been viewed as a route to eliminating political dissent during elections. His opponents from the past two presidential elections have been jailed after the elections. His 2010 election opponent, Victoire Ingabire Umuhoza, served 8 years of a 15-year prison sentence for "conspiracy against the country through terrorism and war" and "genocide denial". His 2017 opponent, Diane Rwigara, was imprisoned for more than a year and placed on trial, where she faced the prospect of 22 years in prison for incitement and fraud due to the content of her campaign. There are often rumors of political opponents being assassinated, even after they have taken refuge in other countries. The two very well-known instances of this were the assassinations of Patrick Karegeya and André Kagwa Rwisereka. Karegeya was a former Rwandan chief of external intelligence and founder of the opposition party, Rwandan National Congress, who was murdered in South Africa, and Rwisereka was a founding member of the Democratic Green Party of Rwanda. In 2017, his administration attempted to create rules that would require government approval of all social media by politicians in order to ensure opposition candidates were not "poisoning the minds" of Rwandans. After international backlash, this policy was never enacted.

== See also ==
- Elections in Rwanda
