= Arusha Accords (Rwanda) =

1993 accords ending the Rwandan Civil War

Peace Agreement between the government of the Republic of Rwanda and the Rwandese Patriotic Front
- Type: Peace treaty
- Context: Rwandan Civil War
- Signed: 4 August 1993; 31 years ago
- Location: Arusha, Tanzania
- Signatories: Ali Hassan Mwinyi (President of Tanzania); Salim Ahmed Salim (Secretary General of the Organisation of African Unity); Vladimir Petrovsky (Under-Secretary General Director General of the United Nations Office at Geneva); Juvénal Habyarimana (President of Rwanda); Alexis Kanyarengwe (Chairman of the Rwandan Patriotic Front)
- Parties: Rwandese Republic; Rwandan Patriotic Front
- Languages: English and French

The Arusha Accords, officially the Peace Agreement between the Government of the Republic of Rwanda and the Rwandan Patriotic Front, also known as the Arusha Peace Agreement or Arusha negotiations, were a set of five accords (or protocols) signed in Arusha, Tanzania, on 4 August 1993, by the government of Rwanda and the rebel Rwandan Patriotic Front (RPF), under mediation, to end a three-year Rwandan Civil War. Primarily organized by the Organisation of African Unity and the heads of state in the African Great Lakes region, the talks began on 12 July 1992, and ended on 4 August 1993, when the accords were finally signed.

== Agreements ==
The Arusha Accords envisioned the establishment of a Broad-Based Transitional Government (BBTG), which would include the insurgent RPF and the five political parties that had composed a temporary government since April 1992 in anticipation of general elections. The Accords included other points considered necessary for lasting peace: the rule of law, repatriation of refugees both from fighting and from power sharing agreements, and the merging of government and rebel armies.

Of twenty-one cabinet posts in the transitional government, the National Republican Movement for Democracy and Development (MRND), the former ruling party, was given five, including the Defence portfolio. The Rwandan Patriotic Front got the same number, including the portfolio of the Interior and the role of Vice-Prime Minister. The major opposition party, the Republican Democratic Movement (MDR), was given four posts, including the office of Prime Minister, assigned to Faustin Twagiramungu. The Social Democratic Party and the Liberal Party were each given three portfolios, while the Christian Democratic Party was given one. The Broad Based Transitional Government never materialized. Juvénal Habyarimana and the MRND stalled the negotiations.

The Rwandan Patriotic Front was granted participation in the national assembly. It was agreed upon by both parties that RPF troops would not only be allowed to join the national Rwandan army, but make up at least half of the officer positions. The Accords also provided for establishment of a military composed of sixty percent government troops and forty percent from the Rwandan Patriotic Front.

It was agreed that the transitional government and national assembly would be established no more than thirty-seven days after the signing of the Accords. The transitional period was limited to twenty-two months, after which general elections would be held.

The delegations signed the protocol on 3 August 1993, and President Habyarimana and RPF president Alexis Kanyarengwe signed the following day.

== Impact ==
Intended as a negotiation for the sharing of power between the rebels and the Rwandan government, the talks produced an agreement that favored the Rwandan Patriotic Front because of disagreements within the government. The government delegation was led by the opposition Foreign Minister, Boniface Ngulinzira (MDR), until President Habyarimana replaced him with Defense Minister James Gasana (MRND) in January 1993. The Arusha Accords stripped many powers from the office of the President, transferring them to the transitional government. In a speech on 15 November 1992, Habyarimana referred to the Arusha Accords as "scraps of paper" and ridiculed his opponents for shunning elections. According to André Guichaoua, this did not reflect opposition to the peace accords as such:

Speeches like this coming from the authorities within the MRND toward the latter part of 1992 provoked quite a bit of polemics and were frequently held up to illustrate the presumed refusal of negotiations on the part of the president and his party, the MRND. But this is to make unduly short shrift of the profound communication gap between political leaders confident in their mass appeal and the negotiators in Arusha. The latter, speaking on behalf of the opposition and the rebel army, were busy putting together consensual arrangements intended to unseat an incumbent president supremely confident that he would come out of the electoral process stronger and legitimized anew.

The agreement moreover unsettled numerous soldiers who feared an overall demobilization as a consequence of the army merger provision in the agreement. This is a contributory factor in explaining the ensuing genocide the year after.

On 5 October 1993, the United Nations Security Council passed Resolution 872, which established the United Nations Assistance Mission for Rwanda (UNAMIR). Its objective was assistance in and supervision of implementation of the Arusha Accords. The initial UN presence was 2,548 military personnel, the biggest national contingent being 440 Belgian soldiers. The head of the mission was Jacques-Roger Booh-Booh.

On 6 April 1994, the airplane of Habyarimana and Burundian President Cyprien Ntaryamira (also a Hutu) was shot down as it flew towards the Kigali airport. Responsibility for the attack is a matter of contention, with both the Hutu extremists and the RPF under suspicion. The assassination was a catalyst for the Rwandan genocide. It was one of several assassinations that occurred with similar political motives as moderates were targeted by the CDR, the hardline faction once part of the MRND. Soldiers of UNAMIR were present before, during, and after the violence. The limitations of the UN, due to national sovereignty and the need to remain impartial when conducting Chapter 6 peacekeeping operations, led to the impotence of UNAMIR to do anything more than bear witness to the genocide and protect refugees at a limited number of sites. After 10 Belgian soldiers were killed in April 1994, the Belgian contingent was removed from Rwanda and the size of the mission reduced to around 270 personnel. Belgian soldiers abandoned refugees labelled ibiyitso at the Ecole Technique Officiele, who were then slaughtered by the Interahamwe and other Pawa collaborators. International powers such as France, the UK and the US did not have the political motivation to send troops or financial support for UNAMIR, although many of these countries were able to remove their foreign nationals from danger. The Ghanaian, Tunisian and Bangladeshi UNAMIR soldiers who stayed saved the lives of tens of thousands of refugees at various sites, including Amahoro stadium and Hotel Mille-Collines.

== Bibliography ==
- Dallaire, Romeo (2004). Shake Hands with the Devil. Carroll & Graf. ISBN 9780786715107.
- Melvern, Linda (2000). A people betrayed: the role of the West in Rwanda's genocide (ill. ed.). Zed Books. ISBN 978-1-85649-831-9.
