= Agnes Mukabaranga =

Rwandan politician

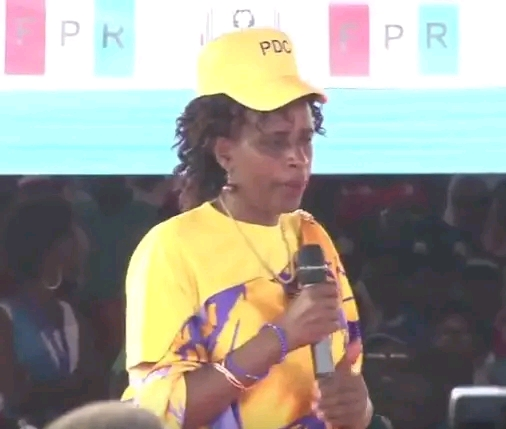
Agnes Mukabaranga

Agnes Mukabaranga is a Rwandan politician. Mukabaranga is a member of the Christian Democratic Party (PDC) and member of both the Pan-African Parliament and former member of both the National Assembly and the Rwandan Senate. She is a lawyer by profession.

== Political career ==
Mukabaranga was appointed an inaugural member of the transitional National Assembly, which was set up following the 1994 Rwandan genocide, and was loosely based on the Arusha Accords agreed the previous year. In 2003, a new permanent constitution was approved for the country in a referendum, which established a multi-party state with a bicameral parliament consisting of a senate and a chamber of deputies. Mukabaranga was appointed to the new senate following the election of Paul Kagame as the first president under the new constitution. She was one of 39 women elected or appointed to the parliament that year, compared with 41 men. Promising to fight for justice and reconciliation in the country following the genocide, she emphasised the role of women in the process, saying "Women are more prepared to make compromises, are more peace-loving and more conciliatory".

In 2013, having previously left the senate, Mukabaranga was elected for a six-month term as the spokesperson for the National Consultative Forum for Political Parties, a role she held jointly with a nurse and political newcomer, Sylvie Mpongera of the Rwanda Socialist Party (PSR).

== Personal life ==
Agnes Mukabaranga lost her brothers in the Rwandan genocide, and is a mother to four children.
