= Augustin Iyamuremye =

Rwandan academic and politician

4th President of the Rwandan Senate
- In office 17 October 2019 – 8 December 2022
- Preceded by: Bernard Makuza
- Succeeded by: François-Xavier Kalinda

Personal details
- Born: 15 March 1946 (age 79)
- Political party: PSD
- Occupation: Veterinarian

Augustin Iyamuremye (born 15 March 1946) is a Rwandan politician and academic. He is married, and his wife is a daughter of former president Theodore Sindikubwabo. He has been serving as the President of the Senate from 17 October 2019 until his resignationon December 8 2022. Iyamuremye is a member of the Social Democratic Party. Iyamuremye was Senior Intelligence Officer during the Habyarimana’s regime, Minister of Foreign Affairs under former President Pasteur Bizimungu from 1999 until the government's resignation in March 2000 and served as the Minister of Information under Paul Kagame. Iyamuremye is from the Southern Province. He is also a member of the Pan-African Parliament and Professor at the National University of Rwanda. He is a Veterinary doctor by profession.

He was the President of Rwandan Senate until his resignation on December 8 2022. He is a supporter of the Campaign for the Establishment of a United Nations Parliamentary Assembly.
