= Ingando =

Ingando camps are Rwandan political and civic reeducation and indoctrination camps. These camps were created by the ruling party of Rwanda, the Rwandan Patriotic Front (RPF). Ingando camp participants are required to wear military uniforms, live together and participate in shared activities.

== History ==
The RPF introduced ingando in the early 1990s as an aid to mobilisation. Following the Rwandan Civil War and genocide, the RPF took control of the country and instituted the first camps for returned refugees. Ingando were also introduced to promote reconciliation and national unity after the genocide.

A number of government organs have administered ingando. From 1996 to 1999, the Ingando program was administered by the Ministry of Youth, Culture and Sports, and thereafter the National Unity and Reconciliation Commission. A significant proportion of Ingando camps are for ex-rebels. The Rwanda Demobilisation and Reintegration Commission is responsible for ingando for ex-combatants.

== Activities ==
Participants take part in classes on "civic education, unity and reconciliation, government programs, psychological demilitarization, reintegration into civilian life, and HIV/AIDS". Many participants return home after the programme, while others are encouraged (or forced) to join the Rwandan military.

The NGO Asylos reported a case of a Hutu-Tutsi girl called to go to the Ingando camp and who "was subject to high levels of violence, discrimination, and repeated abuse, experiencing sexual harassment and multiple episodes of rape".
