= Centrist Democratic Party =

The Centrist Democratic Party may refer to:

- Centrist Democratic Party (Rwanda)
- Centrist Democratic Party of the Philippines
