= Marie Rose Mureshyankwano =

Rwandan politician

Marie Rose Mureshyankwano (born 1968) is a Rwandan politician. She was an MP from 2005 to 2016. Since 2019 she has been a member of the Senate of Rwanda elected from Western Province.

== Life ==
Marie Rose Mureshyankwano has a master's degree in Development Studies. From 1992 to 1994, and again from 1997 to 2001, she worked as a primary school teacher. From 2001 to 2005 she was an instructor in a secondary school.

In 2005, Mureshyankwano became an MP in the Chamber of Deputies. She remained an MP until 2016. From 2016 to 2018, she was Governor of the Southern Province, and in 2018-19 worked as advisor to the General Secretariat of RPF-Inkotanyi.

In 2019, Mureshyankwano was one of three candidates elected as Senator for Western Province.
