= Diane Rwigara =

Rwandan businesswoman and politician

Diane Shima Rwigara
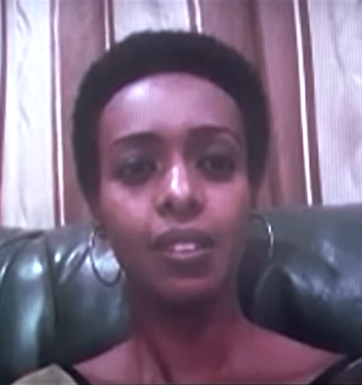
- Diane Rwigara in 2018
- Born: 1981 (age 42–43); Kigali, Rwanda
- Citizenship: Rwanda
- Education: Trained accountant
- Occupations: Businesswoman, accountant, politician, activist
- Known for: Attempted candidacies in 2017 and 2024; Acquittal of political charges
- Title: Leader of the People Salvation Movement
- Term: 2017–present
- Predecessor: Position established
- Parents: Assinapol Rwigara (died 2015) (father); Adeline Rwigara (mother)

Diane Shima Rwigara (born 1981) is a Rwandan businesswoman and accountant who stood as an independent candidate in the 2017 Rwandan presidential election. Rwigara was charged on 23 September 2017, alongside her mother and four other defendants, with "inciting insurrection" among other counts, but was acquitted along with her mother on 6 December 2018.

She attempted to run for president in 2024 but her candidacy was rejected, on the ostensible basis of forged signatures.

== Early life ==
Diane Rwigara was born in Kigali in 1981 to an affluent Tutsi family and has three siblings. Her father, Assinapol Rwigara, an industrialist and a key financier of the Rwandan Patriotic Front (RPF), was killed in a car collision on 4 February 2015 in Gacuriro, Kigali. Her family believes the accident was politically motivated murder. The police said he was instantly killed when the Mercedes-Benz car he was driving was in a head-on collision with a heavy truck.

== Career ==
Rwigara was a trained accountant. She has repeatedly spoken out against the country's governance under President Paul Kagame and about injustice and oppression.

On 3 May 2017, Rwigara announced her intention to run in the presidential election. 72 hours later, faked nude photos of her appeared in an apparent attempt at humiliation and intimidation. She said that the pictures were 'the regime's attempt to discredit me and taint my public reputation," and added that Rwandan authorities had not condemned the act. She reiterated her intention to run, with campaign vows to work towards eradicating poverty, create more jobs and champion free speech.

On 7 July 2017, the National Electoral Commission disqualified Rwigara from the election on technical grounds, alleging she had used forged signatures in her presidential bid and had submitted only 572 valid signatures rather than the required 600. Rwigara said she submitted 958 signatures, with an additional 120 after some were disqualified. Two other candidates were also disqualified, prompting Amnesty International to say that the election would be held in a "climate of fear and repression." The decision was also criticised by the US State Department and the European Union. Kagame won the 4 August election with 98% of the vote. Rwigara launched an activist group called the People Salvation Movement to challenge the regime on its human rights record, saying that the country's parliament is little more than a rubber-stamp. The People Salvation Movement, according to Rwigara, will continue her work of sensitising Rwandans about their rights, and criticising policies and actions of the ruling Rwandan Patriotic Front party.

On June 7, 2024, the National Electoral Commission (NEC) rejected the candidacy of Diane Rwigara for the 2024 presidential election.

=== Arrest ===
On 30 August 2017, Rwigara's home was raided, with police saying she was being investigated for forgery and tax evasion. Rwigara's family reported her missing, saying that unknown armed men in civilian clothes had held her at gunpoint while the house was searched, but police denied that she had been arrested.

Numerous news outlets reported in September 2017 that Rwigara still could not be reached and that her family continued to claim she is missing. Leon Orsmond, a South African freelance advertising creative, who had helped Rwigara with her social media campaign was also missing in Rwanda since February 2018. Before his disappearance, Orsmond made no secret that he didn't like the government of Kagame.

In June 2018, the Rwanda Revenue Authority sold machinery from the family's tobacco business for almost $2m in a bid to recover what they claimed was $7m in tax arrears. A previous auction of Rwigara's family business assets - of processed tobacco - netted more than 500m Rwandan francs. Amnesty International called on the Rwandan judiciary to ensure that the trial did not become just another means to persecute government critics.

In August 2018, #FreeDianeRwigara was being used by Kenyans on Twitter to call for Kagame to release Rwigara. This came just days after Twitter users in Kenya did the same for Ugandan politician Bobi Wine.

On 5 October 2018, a court ordered a release of Rwigara and her mother, Adeline Rwigara, on bail; this came a few weeks after the early release of 2,140 convicts, including Victoire Ingabire and Kizito Mihigo. After more than one year in prison, Rwanda's High Court finally released Rwigara and her mother, Adeline, on bail. They were told not to leave the capital, Kigali, without permission, and their trial would continue.

Several members of the United States Congress, including Dick Durbin, Ann Wagner, Patrick Leahy and Barbara Lee, as well as members of the congressional Tom Lantos Human Rights Commission called on the Rwandan government to drop the charges as violations freedom of expression. Rwandan officials accused the US politicians of meddling in their judicial procedures.

=== Acquittal ===
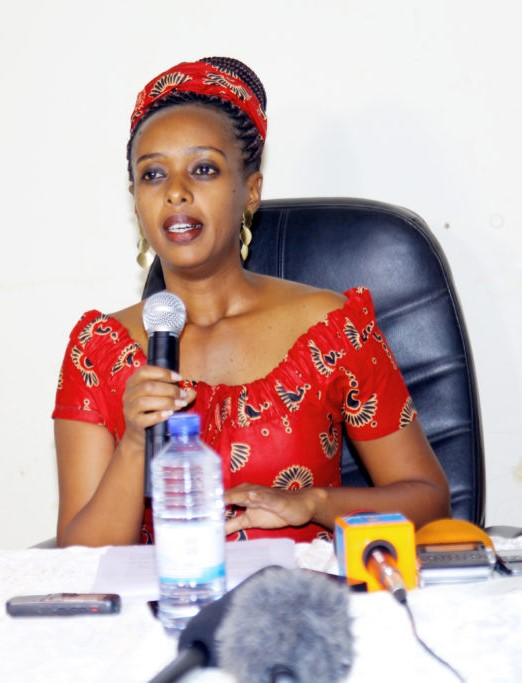
Diane Shima Rwigara, 2019

A three-judge panel of Rwanda's high court acquitted Rwigara and her mother on 6 December 2018, finding all of the charges "baseless". The court found that Rwigara was exercising her right to speech in criticising the President and did not incite violence. Her mother was acquitted of promoting sectarianism, ethnic division and inciting violence. Rwigara addressed the media inside the courtroom, saying,"I hope this means that the persecution I and my family have faced is over and that I have the liberty to speak my mind. That is what I will continue to fight for across the country." The court's decision was welcomed by Amnesty International, who called on the Rwandan government to work "towards developing greater tolerance and acceptance of alternative and critical views."

The National Public Prosecution Appeal filed an appeal on 27 December. On 9 January 2019, Kagame's prosecution authority, having been instructed by the Ministry of Justice, withdrew its appeal against their acquittal. Rwigara welcomed the decisions, saying she would "continue to fight for freedom of expression and human rights in Rwanda."
