= 2018 Rwandan parliamentary election =

Parliamentary elections were held in Rwanda on 3 September 2018, with Rwandan overseas voting the day before. The result was a victory for the Rwandan Patriotic Front coalition, which won 40 of the 53 elected seats while losing its absolute majority over the total of seats, whilst the Democratic Green Party and Social Party Imberakuri both entered parliament for the first time. With 49 of the 80 seats in the newly elected parliament held by women (61%), the elections maintained Rwanda's position as the country with the highest proportion of female MPs.

== Electoral system ==
The 80-seat Chamber of Deputies is elected by two methods: 53 seats are directly elected by closed list proportional representation in a single nationwide constituency with an electoral threshold of 5%; seats are allocated using the largest remainder method. The remaining 27 seats are indirectly elected by local and national councils, including 24 reserved for women (six from Eastern, Southern and Western provinces, four from Northern Province and two from Kigali), two for representatives of youth and one for representatives of the disabled.

== Results ==
Ernest Kamanzi and Clarisse Imaniriho were elected as the youth representatives, whilst Eugene Mussolini was elected as the disabled representative.

Party or alliance		Votes	%	Seats	+/–
RPF Coalition	Rwandan Patriotic Front	4,926,366	73.95	36	–1
RPF Coalition	Centrist Democratic Party	4,926,366	73.95	1	0
RPF Coalition	Ideal Democratic Party	4,926,366	73.95	1	0
RPF Coalition	Party for Progress and Concord	4,926,366	73.95	1	0
RPF Coalition	Democratic Union of the Rwandan People	4,926,366	73.95	1	+1
RPF Coalition	Rwandan Socialist Party	4,926,366	73.95	0	–1
Social Democratic Party		586,215	8.80	5	–2
Liberal Party		479,631	7.20	4	–1
Social Party Imberakuri		304,231	4.57	2	+2
Democratic Green Party of Rwanda		302,778	4.55	2	New
Independents		62,293	0.94	0	0
Indirectly-elected members				27	0
Total		6,661,514	100.00	80	0
Valid votes		6,661,514	99.82		
Invalid/blank votes		12,245	0.18		
Total votes		6,673,759	100.00		
Registered voters/turnout		7,172,612	93.05		
Source: NEC, NEC
