= Tharcisse Karugarama =

Rwandan lawyer and politician

Tharcisse Karugarama is a Rwandan lawyer and politician. A lawyer/attorney by profession, Karugarama was the Minister of Justice and Attorney-General in the Rwandan government for about 7 years.

A member of the RPF, Karugarama has played a role in the prosecution of crimes associated with the Rwandan genocide.

Karugarama was one of the founding members of the RANU (Rwandan Alliance for National Unity ) in 1979. RANU later became known as RPF and it was one of the initial starting points for a movement that mobilized Rwandan refugees in Uganda to return to their homeland. He was a teacher at Kitante Hill School before getting actively involved in the RPF politics in 1990. Karugarama's immediate family members fondly and warmly recall 'fundraising' meetings held at the family home in Western Uganda (Kasese) during the early 1990s to raise money for the RPF struggle.

Upon return to Rwanda, Karugarama served in different challenging roles including a job as 'prosecutor general' for Ruhengeri from 1995, a truly dangerous role because the area was infamous for "abacengezi" and other genocidal forces. Afterwards, Karugarama served in the High Court, the Court of Appeal, and as Vice President of the Supreme Court. Karugarama was named in 2006 to the Justice portfolio, and named Attorney-General in 2007. He was a defender of the Gacaca court system which was introduced to deal with those accused as a result of the Rwanda Genocide. Karugarama noted that they did not have the resources to organise western style courts and the only alternative to the Gacaca system might have been for local communities to just take revenge. Internationally, he became well celebrated for opposing a proposed bill to criminalize homosexual acts, saying that sexual orientation is a private matter, not a state business.

He was dropped from the government and replaced by Johnston Busingye on May 24, 2013.

Karugarama is currently an active member of the Justice Leadership Initiative.
