= Félicien Gatabazi =

Rwandan politician

Félicien Gatabazi (died 21 February 1994) was a Rwandan politician who was killed in the lead-up to the Rwandan genocide. At the time of his death he was secretary general of the Social Democratic Party and served as Minister of Public Works and Energy.

== Career ==
Gatabazi had served in the government of President Juvénal Habyarimana in the 1970s and he was dismissed in a cabinet reshuffle on 8 January 1984. In 1992, Gatabazi's Social Democratic Party entered government and Gatabazi became minister in the cabinet of Dismas Nsengiyaremye.

Gatabazi was perceived to be a moderate Hutu.

== Death ==
After returning home from a political meeting Gatabazi was shot and killed in Kigali.

Shortly after Gatabazi's death an angry crowd killed Martin Bucyana, president of the Coalition for the Defence of the Republic, in Butare, hometown of Gatabazi.
