= Albert Nabonibo =

Rwandan gospel singer, accountant

- Born: 1983 or 1984 (age 42–43); Rwanda, Kacyiru
- Genre: Gospel
- Occupations: Gospel singer; accountant

Albert Nabonibo (born 1983 or 1984) is a gospel singer and accountant from Gicumbi in the suburbs of Kigali, Rwanda. Thomson Reuters Foundation News describes Nabonibo as well-known and popular singer, and reports he has released eight gospel songs since 2012. In August 2019, he came to international attention when he came out as gay, which is held in tension with Africa’s conservative anti-gay views. Additionally the churches in the mostly-Christian country purport that being LGBTQ is sinful. In coming out he became Rwanda's first openly gay gospel singer. PinkNews named him as the eighth “most impactful and moving coming out story” of 2019, noting “the negative reactions he would inevitably face”.

== Biography ==
Albert Nabonibo was born 1984 in the [Kacyiru and Grew in Gicumbi], one of five districts in Northern Province, Rwanda. Nabonibo has been active in the African Pentecostalism churches including as a member of the church choir. He has had some success since 2014, including Umenipenda and Sogongera. Up to August 2019 he has had to keep his sexuality a secret and live a double life. As he suspected, Nabonibo has faced backlash from work, family, and harassment at church leading him to withdraw from all three.

The continent has some of the world’s toughest laws against homosexuality, and LGBTQ people; gay sex is a crime in most countries, with penalties from prison time to death.

== Rwandan attitudes to LGBTQ ==
MamboOnline noted “while homosexuality is legal in Rwanda, it remains a taboo in the country,” although in July 2019 it joined a handful of African countries to vote for a “mandate of the UN Independent Expert on the protection against violence and discrimination” for LGBTQ people. Nabonibo came out so he could “live normally and without pretense.” Gay Times stated, “there are no laws in place to protect LGBTQ residents from anti-hate speech or discrimination in the workplace. Same-sex marriage isn’t recognized.” In Rwanda the “penal code does not explicitly restrict sex between people of the same gender, but same-sex marriage is banned,” as such “many LGBTQ+ people live their lives in secret to avoid societal scorn and judgment.” Since being open about his sexuality, Nabonibo has been shunned by family and friends, and fears he may lose his accountant job “because being openly LGBTQ+ is extremely taboo.” Rwandan human rights activist William Ntwali notes, “If you are gay, members of your community ostracize you.” The Human Rights Watch (HRW) says that these anti-gay stigmas often come from colonial-era laws in Africa (1870s-1900). In the pre-colonial Kingdom of Rwanda “homosexuality was common among male Hutus and Tutsis.” According to HRW, as of September 2019, thirty-two African nations have anti-gay laws “left over from the colonial era.” A leading Ugandan LGBTQ advocate, Frank Mugisha, characterized the backlash as a waste of energy, "If someone decides to love any one differently, how does it hurt you?" Both President Paul Kagame and Archbishop Emmanuel Kolini have made homophobic statements. Nabonibo did get support from Foreign Minister Olivier Nduhungirehe who wrote “All Rwandans are born and remain equal in rights and freedoms. Discrimination of any kind or its propaganda... are prohibited and punishable by law,” which comes from article 16 of Rwanda's Constitution. Nabonibo says there are many closeted Christians afraid to come out “due to possible discrimination and fear for their lives.”

== See also ==
- Christianity and homosexuality
- Donnie McClurkin
