= 2015 Rwandan constitutional referendum =

18 December 2015
- Do you accept the Constitution of the Republic of Rwanda that was amended in 2015?

Results
Choice	Votes	%
Yes	6,143,060	98.32%
No	105,144	1.68%
Valid votes	6,248,204	99.71%
Invalid or blank votes	18,286	0.29%
Total votes	6,266,490	100.00%
Registered voters/turnout	6,392,867	98.02%

A constitutional referendum was held in Rwanda on 18 December 2015. Rwandans living abroad voted on 17 December. The amendments to the constitution would allow President Paul Kagame to run for a third term in office in 2017, as well as shortening presidential terms from seven to five years, although the latter change would not come into effect until 2024. They were approved by around 98% of voters.

== Background ==
A petition calling for Article 101 of the constitution (which imposes presidential term limits) to be amended gained over 3.7 million signatures, equivalent to over 60% of registered voters in Rwanda. The constitutional amendments were approved by the Senate in November 2015. If passed, they would allow Kagame to stand for a further two terms in office after 2024, potentially allowing him to remain in power until 2034. The opposition Democratic Green Party attempted to block the changes, but saw their bid to do so rejected in court. The European Union and United States criticised the proposals, saying that it "undermines democratic principles". In response, Kagame criticised other countries for interfering in domestic affairs.

== Results ==
Choice	Votes	%
For	6,157,922	98.32
Against	105,260	1.68
Total	6,263,182	100.00
Valid votes	6,263,182	99.65
Invalid/blank votes	22,171	0.35
Total votes	6,285,353	100.00
Registered voters/turnout	6,392,867	98.32
Source: NEC
