= Prosperity and Solidarity Party =

Political party in Rwanda

The Prosperity and Solidarity Party (French: Parti de la Solidarité et du Progrès, PSP) is a political party in Rwanda.

== History ==
The PSP contested the 2008 elections as part of the Rwandan Patriotic Front-led coalition, winning a single seat. It did not run in the 2013 elections.
