= Rwandan Socialist Party =

Political party in Rwanda

Rwandan Socialist Party Parti Socialiste Rwandais
- Founded: 1991
- Headquarters: Kigali
- Ideology: Socialism
- Chamber of Deputies: 1 / 80

The Rwandan Socialist Party (French: Parti Socialiste Rwandais, PSR) is a political party in Rwanda. It supports the government of Paul Kagame.

== History ==
The party was founded on 18 August 1991. It joined the Rwandan Patriotic Front-led coalition for the 2003 parliamentary elections, winning a single seat. It remained part of the coalition for the 2008 and 2013 elections, retaining its one seat on both occasions. However, it lost its representation in parliament in the 2018 parliamentary elections.

== Election results ==
=== Chamber of Deputies elections ===
Election	Votes	%	Seats	+/–	Government
2003 (Note: Run as part of the RPF Coalition.)	2,774,661	73.78%	1 / 80	New	Government coalition
2008	3,655,956	78.76%	1 / 80	0	Government coalition
2013		76.22%	1 / 80	0	Government coalition
2018	4,926,366	73.95%	1 / 80	0	Government coalition
2024	6,126,433	68.83%	0 / 80	▼1	Extra-parliamentary
