= 2008 Rwandan parliamentary election =

- 15–18 September 2008
Party	Leader	Vote %	Seats	+/–
RPF coalition	Paul Kagame	78.77	42	+2
PSD	Vincent Biruta	13.13	7	0
PL	Protais Mitali	7.50	4	−2
This lists parties that won seats. See the complete results below.

Parliamentary elections were held in Rwanda from 15 to 18 September 2008. The elections were boycotted by the opposition, and resulted in a victory for the ruling Rwandan Patriotic Front (FPR), which won 42 of the 53 elected seats. The elections also produced the world's first national parliament with a female majority.

== Electoral system ==
The 80 members of the Chamber of Deputies consisted of 53 directly-elected members elected by proportional representation in a single nationwide constituency, 24 women elected by electoral colleges, and three members elected by mini-committees, two of which represented youth and one represented disabled people.

== Campaign ==
Campaigning for the elections began on 25 August 2008. The day was marked by a march of about 2,000 FPR supporters through Kigali.

The FPR assembled a coalition which included six smaller parties: the Ideal Democratic Party (PDI), the Centrist Democratic Party (PDC), the Party for Progress and Concord (PPC), the Prosperity and Solidarity Party (PSP), the Democratic Union of the Rwandan People (UPDR) and the Rwandan Socialist Party (PSR). Aside from the FPR coalition, only two other parties participated in the elections; the Social Democratic Party and the Liberal Party. Since both also supported President Paul Kagame, there was no opposition participation, as they remained in exile. In addition to the political parties, a single independent candidate, J.M.V. Harelimana, stood in the elections.

The United Democratic Forces opposition coalition, based in Belgium, said that the FPR had total control of the state machinery and electoral process, making the election a mere "smoke screen".

== Conduct ==
The EU sent an observation mission, as did the Commonwealth of Nations, the African Union, COMESA, and the East African Legislative Assembly.

The direct phase of voting for 53 seats occurred on 15 September. Voting was from 6 am to 3 pm. Kagame voted in the Nyarugenge district of Kigali, and he said on this occasion that the people and the parties needed "to work together for national development". The indirect phase of voting for 27 seats began on 16 September and ended on 18 September.

== Results ==
Chrysologue Karangwa, the head of the electoral commission, announced on 16 September that the FPR had won 42 seats, the Social Democratic Party won seven, and the Liberal Party won four.

Party or alliance		Votes	%	Seats	+/–
RPF Coalition	Rwandan Patriotic Front	3,655,956	78.77	36	+3
RPF Coalition	Centrist Democratic Party	3,655,956	78.77	1	–2
RPF Coalition	Democratic Union of the Rwandan People	3,655,956	78.77	1	0
RPF Coalition	Ideal Democratic Party	3,655,956	78.77	1	–1
RPF Coalition	Party for Progress and Concord	3,655,956	78.77	1	+1
RPF Coalition	Prosperity and Solidarity Party	3,655,956	78.77	1	New
RPF Coalition	Rwandan Socialist Party	3,655,956	78.77	1	0
Social Democratic Party		609,327	13.13	7	0
Liberal Party		348,186	7.50	4	–2
Independents		27,848	0.60	0	0
Reserved seats				27	0
Total		4,641,317	100.00	80	0
Valid votes		4,641,317	98.80		
Invalid/blank votes		56,372	1.20		
Total votes		4,697,689	100.00		
Registered voters/turnout		4,752,540	98.85		
Source: NEC, African Elections Database

== Aftermath ==
The newly elected deputies were sworn in on 6 October, and Rose Mukantabana was elected as President of the Chamber of Deputies, receiving 70 votes and defeating Abbas Mukama. Dennis Polisi was re-elected as First Vice-President of the Chamber of Deputies, and Jean Damascene Ntawukuriryayo was elected as its Second Vice-President.
