= Party for Progress and Concord =

Political party in Rwanda

Party for Progress and Concord Parti pour le Progrès et la Concorde
- Leader: Alvera Mukabaramba
- President: Christian Marara
- Chairman: Alvera Mukabaramba
- General Secretary: Jean Thierry Karemera
- Founded: 2003
- Preceded by: Republican Democratic Movement
- Headquarters: Kigali
- Ideology: Social welfare
- Political position: Centre-left to centre
- Chamber of Deputies: 0 / 80

The Party for Progress and Concord (Kinyarwanda: Ishyaka ry'Iterambere n'Ubusabane; French: Parti pour le Progrès et la Concorde, PPC) is a political party in Rwanda. The party's motto is: 'Development; Concord; Rwanda's Welfare'.

== History ==
The party was established in 2003 after the banning of the Republican Democratic Movement. In the 2003 parliamentary elections the party received 2% of the vote, failing to win a seat.

Prior to the 2008 parliamentary elections the party joined the Rwandan Patriotic Front-led coalition, and won a single seat in the Chamber of Deputies. It nominated Alvera Mukabaramba as its candidate for the 2010 presidential elections; she finished fourth out of the four candidates with 0.4% of the vote. The party remained part of the coalition for the 2013 elections, in which it retained its seat.

== Platform ==
The ideological focus of the PPC is economic and social development in Rwanda. The party's main commitments, as outlined on their website, are as follows:

- Promote Rwandans’ living conditions mainly based on the Education For All Policy, good health, the promotion of the living conditions of the population and of housing in Rwanda;
- Fight for the establishment of an efficient wage policy;
- Promotion of justice, gender equality and citizenship;
- Sensitisation of Rwandans about work;
- Technology-based development and economy;
- Facilitation of Rwandan population access to finances by establishing a programme reducing bank guarantee and loan interest rates.

== Election results ==
=== Chamber of Deputies elections ===
Election	Party leader	Votes	%	Seats	+/–	Government
2003	Christian Marara	83,563	2.22%	0 / 80	New	Extra-parliamentary
2008 (Note: Run as part of the RPF Coalition.)	Christian Marara	3,655,956	78.76%	1 / 80	▲1	Government coalition
2013	Christian Marara		76.22%	1 / 80	0	Government coalition
2018	Alvera Mukabaramba	4,926,366	73.95%	1 / 80	0	Government coalition
2024	Alvera Mukabaramba	6,126,433	68.83%	0 / 80	▼1	Extra-parliamentary
