= Democratic Union of the Rwandan People =

Political party in Rwanda

Democratic Union of the Rwandan People Union Démocratique du Peuple Rwandais
- Founded: 1992
- Headquarters: Kigali
- Chamber of Deputies: 1 / 80

The Democratic Union of the Rwandese People (Kinyarwanda: Ishyaka Riharanira Ubumwe bw'Abanyarwanda na Demokarasi; French: Union Démocratique du Peuple Rwandais, UDPR) is a political party in Rwanda.

== History ==
The party was established in 1992. It joined the Rwandan Patriotic Front-led alliance before the 2003 parliamentary elections, winning a single seat. It remained part of the alliance during the 2008 parliamentary elections and retained its single seat. However, it lost its seat in the 2013 elections. It returned to parliament after winning one seat in the 2018 elections.

== Election results ==
=== Chamber of Deputies elections ===
Election	Votes	%	Seats	+/–	Government
2003 (Note: Run as part of the RPF Coalition.)	2,774,661	73.78%	1 / 80	New	Government coalition
2008	3,655,956	78.76%	1 / 80	10	Government coalition
2013	Did not contest		0 / 80	▼1	Extra-parliamentary
2018	4,926,366	73.95%	1 / 80	▲1	Government coalition
2024	6,126,433	68.83%	0 / 80	▼1	Extra-parliamentary
