= 1957 Rwandan parliamentary election =

Indirect parliamentary elections were held in Rwanda in 1957.

== Electoral system ==
The Decree of 14 July 1952 by the Belgian authorities introduced an element of democracy to the Rwandan political system. A complicated electoral system was created, which involved seven stages of elections to eventually elect the National Superior Council (French: Conseil Superieur du Pays). The system was modified from the 1953–54 elections with all men aged 18 or over able to vote for the Sub-Chiefdom Councils, as voting had previously been restricted to notables.

Council	Elected members	Ex officio members	Other members
Sub-Chiefdom Council	5–10 members elected by all men aged 18 and over	Sub-chiefs	
Chiefdom Council	10–18 members, 5–9 elected by sub-chiefs and 5–9 elected by notables	Chiefs	
Territorial Council	Sub-chiefs elected from amongst their own and notables elected by Chiefdom Councils	Chiefs	
Superior Council	6 chiefs elected from their own number, 9 notables elected by Territorial Councils	King, presidents of the Territorial Councils	Up to 8 co-opted

== Results ==
The elections in the sub-chiefdoms were held in 1956, with elections to the Chiefdom Councils Territorial Councils and the Superior Council following in 1957.

Council	Members							
Council	Hutus			Tutsis				Total
Council	Elected chiefs	Elected notables	Co-opted	Elected chiefs	Elected notables	Ex officio	Co-opted	Total
Sub-chiefdom councils	0	2,261	0	0	1,292	603	0	4,160
Chiefdom councils	0	107	0	298	245	54	0	704
Territorial councils	0	21	0	46	71	46	0	184
Superior Council	0	0	1	6	9	10	7	33
Source: Sternberger et al.
