= Alexis Kanyarengwe =

Rwandan military officer

Colonel Alexis Kanyarengwe
- Born: 1938; Ruhengeri province, Ruanda-Urundi
- Died: 13 November 2006; Kigali, Rwanda
- Political party: Rwanda Patriotic Front

Colonel Alexis Kanyarengwe (1938–2006) was a Rwandan officer who fled Rwanda in 1980 amidst accusations that he was plotting against Juvénal Habyarimana.

Kanyarengwe rose to power as one of the officers who led a coup on July 5, 1973, that toppled then President Grégoire Kayibanda, installing Habyarimana. He was appointed Minister of the Interior in the new government, and reportedly rose to the number two position. In December 1980 he came under suspicion of fomenting a coup against Habyarimana and fled into exile in Tanzania.

In September 1990, after three years of convincing, Kanyarengwe joined the Rwandan Patriotic Front (RPF), following a meeting with Aloisea Inyumba. This is despite his being a Hutu and the RPF being made primarily of Tutsi in exile. The effect of his defection in Rwanda led to Habyarimana cracking down further on internal opposition.

Kanyarengwe joined the RPF as its vice president, but quickly rose up the ranks. In October 1990, RPF founder Fred Rwigyema was killed in mysterious circumstances, possibly by his deputy Pierre Bayingana. Bayingana was himself assassinated by forces loyal to Rwigyema. In the fallout of these events, Kanyarengwe was thrust into the presidency.

However, real power was thought to be held by RPF vice president Paul Kagame.

On 28 March 1997, Kanyarengwe was sacked from his post as Interior minister after protesting Rwandan Patriotic Army massacres in his home prefecture of Ruhengeri. Ignace Karuhije, who also protested, was removed on the same day. On 15 February 1998, Kanyarengwe was finally replaced by Paul Kagame as chairman of the RPF.

== See also ==
- Rwandan Civil War
