= Prosper Higiro =

Rwandan politician

Prosper Higiro (born 28 January 1961) is a Rwandan politician and member of the Liberal Party as its official chairperson. Since 10 October 2004, Prosper has been a Senator and Vice-President of the Senate representing the Kirehe District in the Eastern Province. Prosper has worked extensively in the Ministry of Commerce, Industry and Handcraft. He is also a member of the Pan-African Parliament. In the 2010 Presidential election he gained 1.37% of the vote, coming third.
