= Jean-Damascène Ntawukuriryayo =

Rwandan politician

2nd President of the Rwandan Senate
- In office 10 October 2011 – 14 October 2014
- Preceded by: Vincent Biruta
- Succeeded by: Bernard Makuza

Personal details
- Born: 8 August 1961 (age 65)
- Party: PSD

Jean-Damascène Ntawukuriryayo (born 8 August 1961) is a Rwandan politician who served as president of the Senate of Rwanda from 2011 to 2014. He also served as minister of health in Rwanda. He became president of the Senate in October 2011, and also served for a time as vice-president of the Chamber of Deputies.

== Early life and education ==
Ntawukuriryayo was born in Runyinya, Rwanda, on 8 August 1961.

He earned a B.A. in pharmacy from the National University of Rwanda and a Ph.D. in pharmaceutical technology from Ghent University, Belgium.

== Career ==
Ntawukuriryayo ran for 2010 Rwandan presidential elections, where he failed (getting 5 percent of votes), and Paul Kagame was re-elected with more than 90% of votes.

From 1997 to 1999, he was vice rector in charge of administration and finance at the National University of Rwanda. He was appointed as minister of state in charge of higher education and scientific research in 1999. Later he was appointed minister of infrastructure.

In November 2002, Ntawukuliryayo was appointed to minister of infrastructure. He served also as minister of state for higher education. On September 28, 2004, he was appointed minister of health. During his tenure in that position, he expanded the social security system to cover over 80% of the population. In 2008 he was elected vice president of the Rwandan National Assembly.

As presidential candidate for the Social Democratic Party (PSD) in 2010, Ntawukuriryayo promised to develop tourism, add value to products exported to the Democratic Republic of Congo, fight soil erosion, improve banana yields and build roads. His platform was much the same as that of the incumbent Paul Kagame. In the election, Kagame gained 93% of the vote and Ntawukuriryayo came second with 4.9%.

Following citing personal reasons, Ntawukuriryayo resigned as president of the Senate on 17 September 2014.
