= Bernard Ntaganda =

Rwandan politician (born 1967)

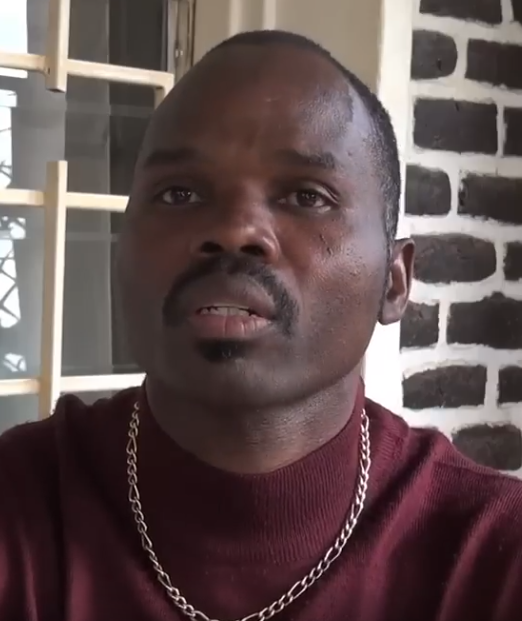
Bernard Ntaganda (2015)

Bernard Ntaganda (born 1967) is the founder and president of the Social Party Imberakuri, the 10th political formation recognized in Rwanda, formed in December 2008. Ntaganda was born in Ruhango District, Gitarama Prefecture.

On June 24, 2010, Mr. Bernard Ntaganda was arrested and sentenced to 4 years due to what the government ruled were illegal demonstrations. Daniel Bekele, the Africa director at Human Rights Watch, criticized the sentence as politically motivated. Ntaganda was released in June 2014 after serving a four-year term. In May 2024, the High Court refused the rehabilitation of his civil rights, stripped after his conviction in 2011, preventing him from running in the 2024 presidential election.
