= 2003 Rwandan parliamentary election =

Parliamentary elections were held in Rwanda between 29 September and 2 October 2003. They were the first parliamentary elections since 1988 and the second multi-party national elections in the country's history. They were held following the approval of a new constitution in a referendum in August 2003.

The result was a victory for the Rwandan Patriotic Front-led coalition, which won 40 of the 53 elected seats in the new Chamber of Deputies, and eighteen of the 27 reserved for women, youth and the handicapped. Voter turnout was 96.5%.

== Electoral system ==
The 80 members of the Chamber of Deputies consisted of 53 directly-elected members elected by proportional representation in a single nationwide constituency, 24 women elected by electoral colleges, and three members elected by mini-committees, two of which represented youth and one represented disabled people.

== Campaign ==
AA total of 230 candidates contested the 53 directly-elected seats, with the official campaigning period starting on 5 September 2003.

== Results ==
| Party or alliance | | Votes | % | Seats |
|---|---|---|---|---|
| RPF Coalition | Rwandan Patriotic Front | 2,774,661 | 73.78 | 33 |
| RPF Coalition | Centrist Democratic Party | 2,774,661 | 73.78 | 3 |
| RPF Coalition | Ideal Democratic Party | 2,774,661 | 73.78 | 2 |
| RPF Coalition | Democratic Union of the Rwandan People | 2,774,661 | 73.78 | 1 |
| RPF Coalition | Rwandan Socialist Party | 2,774,661 | 73.78 | 1 |
| Social Democratic Party | | 463,067 | 12.31 | 7 |
| Liberal Party | | 396,978 | 10.56 | 6 |
| Party for Progress and Concord | | 83,563 | 2.22 | 0 |
| Independents | | 42,333 | 1.13 | 0 |
| Reserved seats | | | | 27 |
| Total | | 3,760,602 | 100.00 | 80 |
| Valid votes | | 3,760,602 | 98.48 | |
| Invalid/blank votes | | 58,001 | 1.52 | |
| Total votes | | 3,818,603 | 100.00 | |
| Registered voters/turnout | | 3,958,058 | 96.48 | |
Source: African Elections Database
