= François-Xavier Kalinda =

Rwandan politician (born 1962)

François-Xavier Kalinda is a Rwandan politician who serves as President of Senate of Rwanda since 9 January 2023. He was born on 31 May 1962. He has a master's degree in law from Ottawa University. He served as Dean at School of Law of University of Rwanda.
