= Frank Habineza =

Rwandan politician

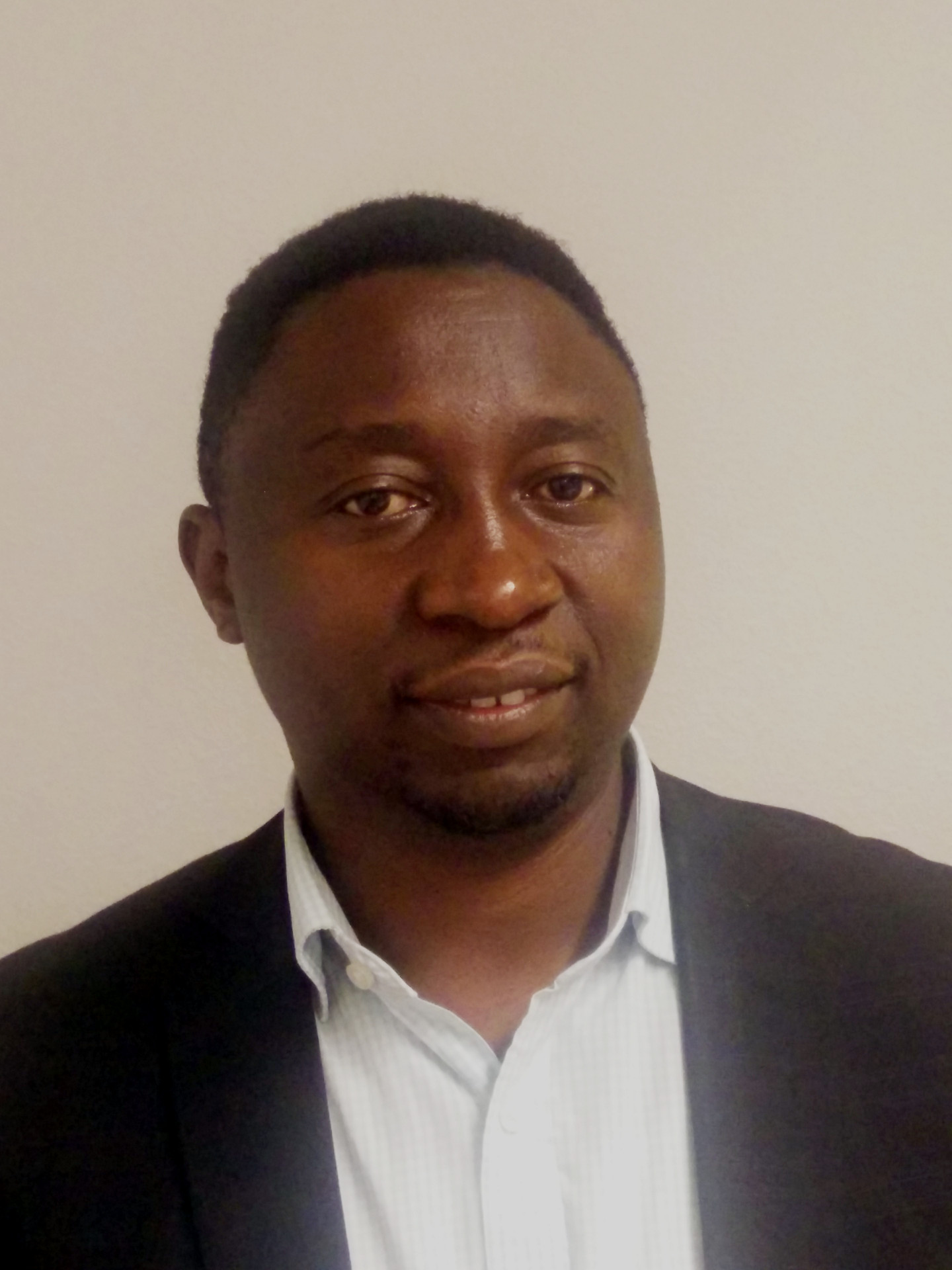
- Habineza in 2016

Chairman of the Democratic Green Party
- Incumbent
- Assumed office 14 August 2009
- Preceded by: Position established

Member of the Chamber of Deputies
- In office 19 September 2018 – 15 June 2024

Co-Convener of the Global Greens
- Incumbent
- Assumed office 2023 Serving with Bodil Valero
- Preceded by: Bob Hale and Gloria Polanco

Personal details
- Born: 22 February 1977 (age 49) Mityana, Uganda
- Citizenship: Rwanda; Sweden (??-2017)
- Party: Democratic Green Party of Rwanda

Frank Habineza (born 22 February 1977) is a Rwandan politician, and founder and chairman of the Democratic Green Party of Rwanda, a political party formed in August 2009. In its first year, the party made six unsuccessful attempts to register. As of mid-August 2010, the party was still not registered, and therefore was unable to submit a candidate for the August 2010 Presidential elections. In September 2018, Frank Habineza and one other member of the Democratic Green Party of Rwanda were elected into Parliament. They are the first Opposition candidates to win seats in the Rwandan parliament since Kagame's Rwanda Patriotic Front (RPF) came to power after the 1994 genocide.

He made long-shot bids to become president in 2017 and 2024, losing both times to Paul Kagame by wide margins.

== Background ==
Habineza was born in Mityana, Uganda in a Rwandese family on 22 February 1977. He attended the National University of Rwanda from 1999 to 2004, graduating in Political and Administrative Sciences with a major in Public Administration. While at University he started a student association campaigning for environment protection. In 2005, he became a personal assistant to the Minister of Lands, Environment, Water, Forestry and Mines. He was the official correspondent of Rwanda Newsline and UMUSESO while he was a student in Butare. He also worked for the former Rwanda Herald Newspaper, whose publisher Asuman Bisika was declared 'persona non-grata' in mid-2002.

Habineza was for three years (2006–2009), National Coordinator for the Nile Basin Discourse Forum in Rwanda (NBDF), a civil society platform that had over 50 NGOs involved in the conservation of river Nile. He resigned in May 2009. He was also President of the Rwanda NGOs Forum on Water, Sanitation and Environment-RWASEF and founder chairman for the Rwandan Environment Conservation Organisation (RECOR). He resigned from all the NGOs when he joined active opposition politics. In June 2010 these two organizations distanced themselves from him after a report alleged that donor funds had been diverted for political purposes. The report, issued by the Ministry of Local Government, named Habineza as one of the people behind "briefcase" NGO's that fleece donors, and named five NGOs as vehicles used by him to obtain funding for political activities.

== Political career ==
In August 2009, Habineza founded the Democratic Green Party of Rwanda. The party faced challenges in registering officially, which prevented it from participating in the 2010 presidential elections. In July 2010, the party's vice-president, André Kagwa Rwisereka, was found murdered, leading Habineza to flee to Sweden citing safety concerns. He returned to Rwanda in 2012 and successfully registered the DGPR in 2013.

Habineza ran for president in the 2017 elections, receiving 0.48% of the vote, and again in 2024, securing 0.5% of the vote. In 2018, he was elected to the Rwandan Parliament, becoming one of the first opposition members to do so since the RPF came to power. He served as a Member of the Chamber of Deputies until 2024.

== International roles and recognition ==
Habineza has held significant positions in international green politics. He served as the President of the African Greens Federation and was a member of the Executive Committee of the Global Greens. In recognition of his advocacy for democracy and human rights, he received an honorary Doctorate of Humanities from Bethel College in Indiana, USA, in 2013.

== Personal life ==
Habineza resides in Gasabo District, Kigali, Rwanda.
