= Ideal Democratic Party =

Political party in Rwanda

Ideal Democratic Party Parti Démocratique Idéal
- Headquarters: Kigali
- Ideology: Islamic democracy
- Chamber of Deputies: 2 / 80

The Ideal Democratic Party (Kinyarwanda: Ishyaka Ntangarugero muri Demokarasi; French: Parti Démocratique Idéal, PDI) is a political party in Rwanda.

== History ==
The party was established as the Islamic Democratic Party (Parti Démocratique Islamique) in 1992.

In 2003 the party adopted its current name as a result of a constitutional prohibition on religious-based parties. It contested the September parliamentary 2003 elections as part of an alliance led by the ruling Rwandan Patriotic Front (RPF), winning two seats. PDI leader Mussa Harerimana was subsequently appointed Minister of the Interior.

The PDI continued its alliance with the RPF for the 2008 parliamentary elections, in which it won a single seat. It remained part of the alliance for the 2013 elections, retaining its one seat.

== Electoral history ==
=== Chamber of Deputies elections ===
Election	Votes	%	Seats	+/–	Government
2003 (Note: Run as part of the RPF Coalition.)	2,774,661	73.78%	2 / 80	New	Extra-parliamentary
2008	3,655,956	78.76%	1 / 80	▼1	Government coalition
2013		76.22%	1 / 80	0	Government coalition
2018	4,926,366	73.95%	1 / 80	0	Government coalition
2024	410,513	4.61%	2 / 80	▲1	Support

== See also ==
- List of Islamic political parties
