= Christine Mukabunani =

Rwandan politician

Chrisitine Mukabunani (born 1972) is a Rwandan politician and a member of parliament in Rwanda since 2018. She is chairperson of the Social Party Imberakuri since 2010.

== Political career ==
Mukabunani was elected president of the Social Party Imberakuri in 2010.

She is serving as a member of parliament in Rwanda since 2018, she participated in training programmer on the political empowerment of women, she was a chairperson of the Social Party IMBERAKURI. and they used to be in the General Assembly of the National Consultative Forum of Political Organizations (NFPO).
