= Constitution of Rwanda =

The Constitution of Rwanda was adopted by referendum on May 26, 2003. It replaced the Constitution of 1991.

The Constitution provides for a presidential system of government, with separation of powers between the three branches. It condemns the Rwandan genocide in the preamble, expressing hope for reconciliation and prosperity. It is written in Kinyarwanda, English, and French.

== History ==
Between 1994 and 2003 Rwanda was governed by a set of documents combining President Habyarimana's 1991 Constitution, the Arusha Accords, and some additional protocols introduced by the transitional government. As required by the Accords, Paul Kagame set up a Constitutional Commission to draft a new permanent Constitution. The Constitution was required to adhere to a set of fundamental principles including equitable power sharing and democracy.

The Commission sought to ensure that the draft Constitution was "home-grown", relevant to Rwanda's specific needs and reflected the views of the entire population. They sent questionnaires to civil groups across the country and rejected offers of help from the international community, except for financial assistance.

The draft constitution was released in 2003; it was approved by the Parliament, and was then put to a referendum in May of that year. The government gave the referendum a high profile, which meant that ultimately 95% of eligible adults registered to vote and the turnout on voting day was 87%. The constitution was overwhelmingly accepted, with 93% voting in favour. This constitution, among other things, changed the country's official name from "Rwandese Republic" to "Republic of Rwanda".

A referendum on the Rwandan constitution was held on 18 December 2015. The amendments would allow President Paul Kagame to run for a third term in office in 2017, as well as shortening presidential terms from seven to five years, although the latter change would not come into effect until 2024. They were approved by around 98% of voters.

The constitution was further updated on August 4th, 2023.

== Overview ==
The constitution provides for a two house parliament, an elected President serving seven year terms, and multi-party politics. The constitution also sought to prevent Hutu or Tutsi hegemony over political power. Article 54 states that "political organizations are prohibited from basing themselves on race, ethnic group, tribe, clan, region, sex, religion or any other division which may give rise to discrimination".

In general it was men who had organised the 1994 Genocide against the Tutsi and they were disproportionately the victims. The constitution reserved 24 of the 80 seats for women and this did not preclude other women from competing for the remaining seats in the lower house. This lower house has had nearly half of its members being female. Six places are also reserved for women in the upper house.

According to Human Rights Watch, this clause along with later laws enacted by Parliament effectively make Rwanda a one-party state, as "under the guise of preventing another genocide, the government displays a marked intolerance of the most basic forms of dissent".

== Provisions Concerning the Rwanda Genocide ==
The Constitution of Rwanda has several provisions that explicitly discuss the impact and legacy of the Rwanda Genocide of 1994. The preamble recognizes "the Genocide committed against the Tutsi that decimated more than 1,000,000 sons and daughters of Rwanda", though modern scholars generally say that the number dead was between 500,000 and 600,000. The preamble also recognizes the need to fight genocide negationism and "genocide ideology". Articles 50 and 52 require the government to aid needy survivors of the genocide and to preserve memorial sites related to it.
