= 1954 Rwandan parliamentary election =

Indirect parliamentary elections were held in Rwanda in 1954.

== Electoral system ==
The Decree of 14 July 1952 by the Belgian authorities introduced an element of democracy to the Rwandan political system. A complicated electoral system was created, which involved seven stages of elections to eventually elect the national Superior Council (French: Conseil Superieur du Pays).

Council	Elected members	Ex officio members	Other members
Sub-Chiefdom Council	5–10 members elected by 10–18 notables	Sub-chiefs	
Chiefdom Council	10–18 members, 5–9 elected by sub-chiefs and 5–9 elected by notables	Chiefs	
Territorial Council	Sub-chiefs elected from amongst their own and notables elected by Chiefdom Councils	Chiefs	
Superior Council	6 chiefs elected from their own number, 9 notables elected by Territorial Councils	King, presidents of the Territorial Councils	Up to 8 co-opted

== Results ==
The elections in the sub-chiefdoms and chiefdoms were held in 1953, with the elections to the Territorial Councils and the Superior Council following in 1954.

Council	Members								Votes cast			
Council	Hutus			Tutsis				Total	Hutu	Tutsi	Twa	Total
Council	Elected chiefs	Elected notables	Co-opted	Elected chiefs	Elected notables	Ex officio	Co-opted	Total	Hutu	Tutsi	Twa	Total
Sub-chiefdom councils	0	1,995	0	0	1,562	628	0	4,187	7,674	5,442	29	13,485
Chiefdom councils	1	78	0	299	268	46	0	692	79	613	0	692
Territorial councils	0	19	0	56	83	46	0	204	19	185	0	204
Superior Council	0	0	3	6	9	10	5	33	3	29	0	32
Source: Sternberger et al.
