= 2003 Rwandan constitutional referendum =

- 26 May 2003

Results
Choice	Votes	%
Yes	3,132,291	93.42%
No	220,462	6.58%
Valid votes	3,352,753	96.56%
Invalid or blank votes	119,447	3.44%
Total votes	3,472,200	100.00%
Registered voters/turnout	3,863,965	89.86%

A constitutional referendum was held in Rwanda on 26 May 2003. The new constitution created a presidential republic with a bicameral parliament, and banned the incitement of racial hatred. It was approved by 93% of voters with a 90% voter turnout. Following its approval, presidential elections were held on 25 August and parliamentary elections on 29–30 September.

== Results ==
Choice	Votes	%
For	3,132,291	93.42
Against	220,462	6.58
Invalid/blank votes	119,447	–
Total	3,472,200	100
Registered voters/turnout	3,863,965	89.9
