= Social Party Imberakuri =

Political party in Rwanda

Social Party Imberakuri Ishyaka ry’Imberakuri Riharanira Imibereho Myiza
- French name: Parti Social Imberakuri
- Founder: Bernard Ntaganda
- Founded: 14 December 2008
- Split from: Social Democratic Party
- Headquarters: Kigali, Rwanda
- Ideology: Social democracy
- Political position: Centre-left
- Chamber of Deputies: 2 / 80

Website
- www.psimberakuri-rwanda.org

The Social Party Imberakuri (Kinyarwanda: Ishyaka ry’Imberakuri Riharanira Imibereho Myiza; French: Parti Social Imberakuri, PS-Imberakuri), is a political party in Rwanda. "Imberakuri" in the name of the party translates as "supporter of truth".

== History ==
The party was formed by Bernard Ntaganda on 14 December 2008 after he left the Social Democratic Party. Due to what the government ruled were illegal demonstrations, party leaders including Ntaganda were arrested on 24 June 2010 and released on 9 July 2010, although Ntaganda was denied bail, and sentenced to four years in prison in 2011. He was released in 2014. Christine Mukabunani was elected new president of the party in March 2010.

The party contested the 2013 parliamentary elections, failing to win a seat. However, it entered parliament after winning two seats in the 2018 elections.

== Election results ==
=== Chamber of Deputies elections ===
Election	Party leader	Votes	%	Seats	+/–	Government
2013	Bernard Ntaganda		1.46%	0 / 80	New	Extra-parliamentary
2018	Christine Mukabunani	304,231	4.57%	2 / 80	▲2	Opposition
2024	Christine Mukabunani	401,524	4.51%	2 / 80	0	Opposition
