= 2017 Rwandan presidential election =

- 4 August 2017
- Registered: 6,897,076
- Turnout: 98.15% (▲9.85pp)
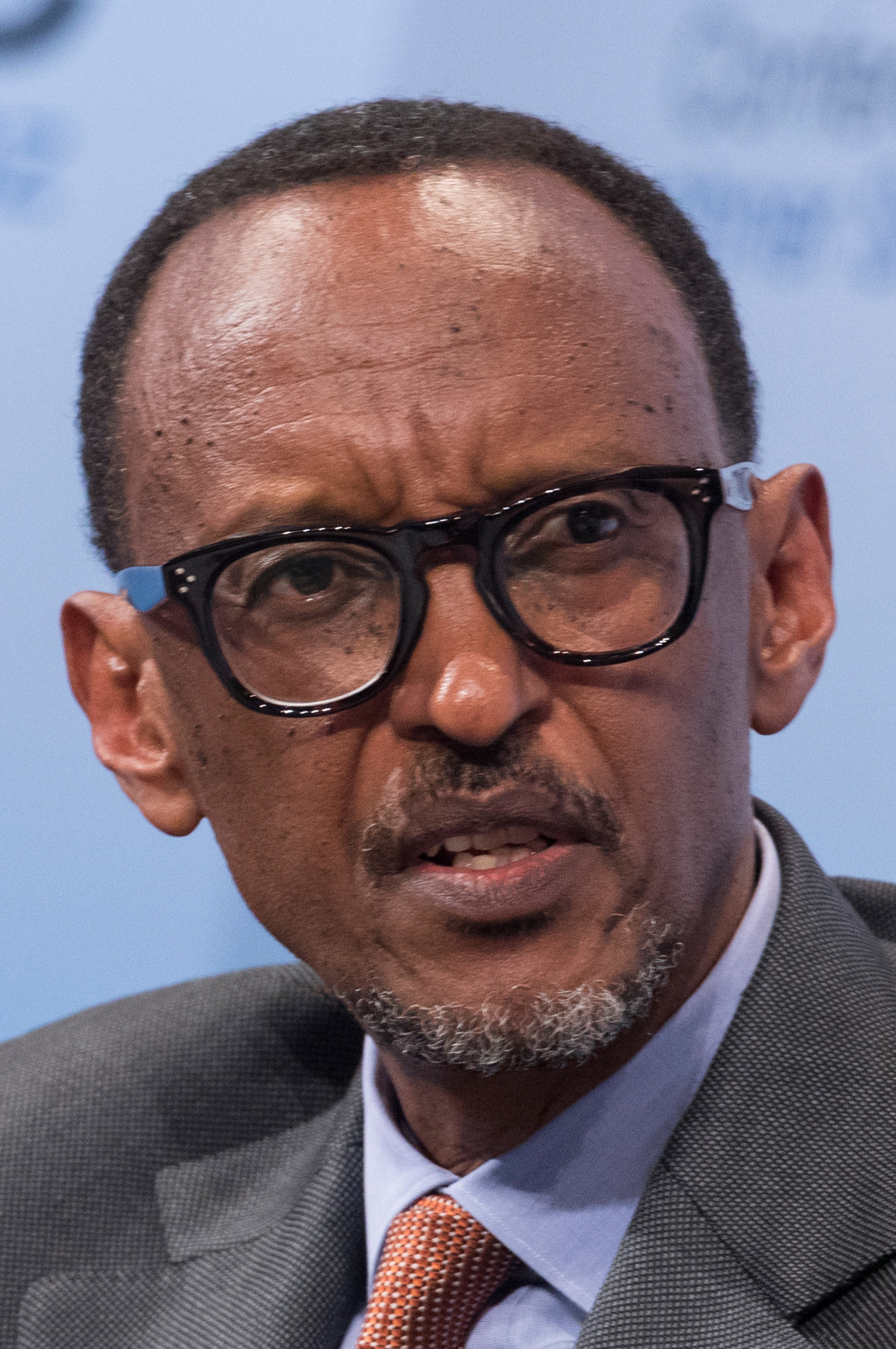

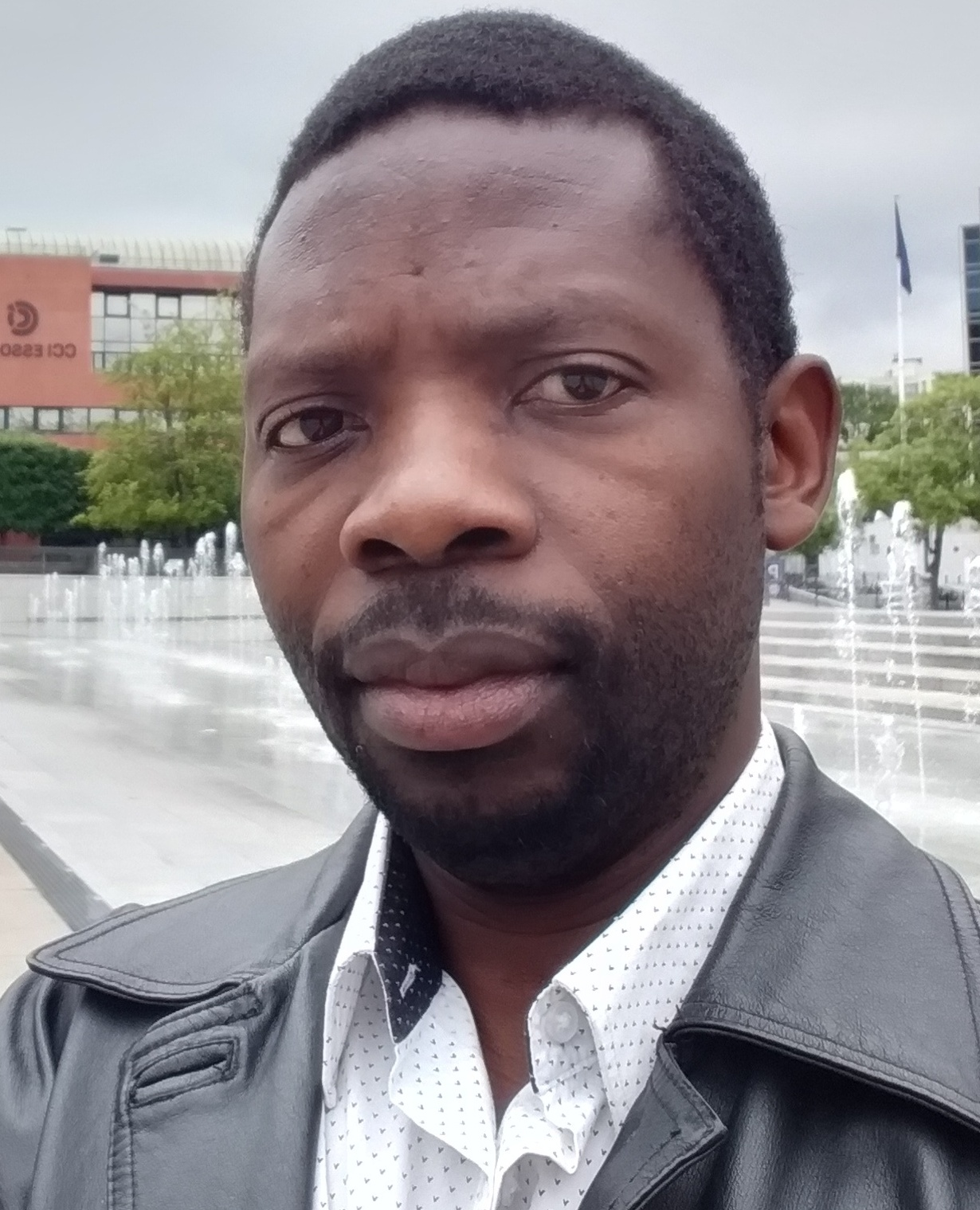
Nominee	Paul Kagame	Philippe Mpayimana
Party	RPF	Independent
Popular vote	6,675,472	49,031
Percentage	98.79%	0.73%
- Results by district Kagame: >95%
President before election
Paul Kagame
RPF
Elected President
Paul Kagame
RPF

Presidential elections were held in Rwanda on 4 August 2017. The incumbent President of Rwanda, Paul Kagame, was re-elected to a third seven-year term, allegedly with 98.79% of the vote on a 98.15% turnout.

== Background ==
A referendum in 2015 approved constitutional amendments that allow incumbent President Paul Kagame to run for a third term in office in 2017, as well as shortening presidential terms from seven to five years, although the latter change would not come into effect until 2024.

== Electoral system ==
The President of Rwanda is elected in one round of voting by plurality.

== Candidates ==
Kagame announced that he would run for a third term in a televised address to mark the start of 2016, saying "You requested me to lead the country again after 2017. Given the importance and consideration you attach to this, I can only accept. But I don't think that what we need is an eternal leader."

In February 2017, Philippe Mpayimana announced his candidacy as an independent candidate. A former journalist and author, he had lived outside Rwanda since 1994 and worked with humanitarian organisations.

35-year-old businesswoman Diane Rwigara announced her candidacy, running as a critic of Kagame. Days after she launched her campaign, nude photos of Rwigara were leaked onto the Internet in an attempt to discredit her. On 7 July the National Electoral Commission disqualified Rwigara and two other candidates on technical grounds, alleging they had not collected enough valid signatures. The commission's decision was criticised by the US State Department and the European Union, while Amnesty International said that the election would be held in a "climate of fear and repression."

Democratic Green Party of Rwanda leader Frank Habineza also declared his candidacy.

== Results ==
Candidate	Party	Votes	%
Paul Kagame	Rwandan Patriotic Front	6,675,472	98.79
Philippe Mpayimana	Independent	49,031	0.73
Frank Habineza	Democratic Green Party of Rwanda	32,701	0.48
Total		6,757,204	100.00
Valid votes		6,757,204	99.82
Invalid/blank votes		12,310	0.18
Total votes		6,769,514	100.00
Registered voters/turnout		6,897,076	98.15
Source: NEC Rwanda

== Aftermath ==
Following his victory, Kagame was sworn in for his third presidential term on 18 August 2017.
