= Alvera Mukabaramba =

Rwandan pediatrician and politician

Doctor Alvera Mukabaramba
- Born: 1 March 1960 (age 66); Rwanda
- Citizenship: Rwandan
- Education: First Pavlov State Medical University (Doctor of Medicine) (PhD in Pediatrics)
- Occupations: Physician and politician
- Years active: 1999–present
- Known for: Politics
- Title: Minister of State for Local Government Responsible for Social Affairs in the Cabinet of Rwanda

Alvera Mukabaramba (born 1 March 1960) is a Rwandan pediatrician and politician who has been the Minister of State for Local Government Responsible for Social Affairs in the Cabinet of Rwanda, since 10 October 2011.

== Background and education ==
She was born in Rwanda on 1 March 1960. She studied at the First Pavlov State Medical University, in St.Petersburg, Russia, graduating with a medical degree. She specialized in pediatrics, and the university awarded her a Doctor of Philosophy in the subject.

== Career ==
Alvera Mukabaramba's political career began in 1999, when she became a member of the National Transitional Assembly, serving in that capacity until 2003. From 2003 until October 2011, she was a Senator in Rwanda's bicameral parliament. Then on 10 October 211, she was appointed State Minister for Social Affairs and Community Development in the Ministry of Local Government, replacing the late Christine Nyatanyi, who died in a hospital in Brussels, Belgium. Since then, she has been retained in the cabinet and has retained her portfolio in the various cabinet reshuffles, including the one on 31 August 2017.

== Other considerations ==
Makaramba is a member of the Party of Progress and Concord (PPC). She has twice ran for the presidency of Rwanda. The first time was in 2003, but she withdrew and threw her weight behind Paul Kagame. She ran again in 2010, but lost.

In 2012, she was elected as the new president of the "Rwanda Forum for Political Parties" (FFFP), an organization that brings together all the political parties in the country, to foster national unity.

== See also ==
- Parliament of Rwanda
- Government of Rwanda
