= Centrist Democratic Party (Rwanda) =

Political party in Rwanda

Centrist Democratic Party Parti Démocrate Centriste
- President: Mukabaranga Agnès
- Headquarters: Kigali
- Ideology: Christian democracy
- Political position: Centre-right
- Chamber of Deputies: 1 / 80

Website
- pdc-rwanda.rw

The Centrist Democratic Party (Kinyarwanda: Ishyaka riharanira Demokarasi ihuza Abanyarwanda; French: Parti Démocrate Centriste, PDC) is a political party in Rwanda. It is supportive of the government of Paul Kagame.

== History ==
The party was established as the Christian Democratic Party (Parti Démocratique Chrêtien) in 1991 by Jean-Népomuscène Nayinzira. It joined the government in December 1991 and was given a single ministerial post.

In the run-up to the August 2003 presidential elections the party was banned as a result of a constitutional prohibition on religious-based parties. The party was reconstituted as the Centrist Democratic Party in time to contest the September parliamentary 2003 elections, in which it allied itself with the ruling Rwandan Patriotic Front, winning three seats. PDC leader Alfred Mukezamfura was elected Speaker of the Chamber of Deputies.

The party continued its alliance with the RPF for the 2008 parliamentary elections, but was reduced to one seat. In 2009 Agnès Mukabaranga was elected leader of the party after Mukezamfura stepped down. It was again part of the RPF-led alliance for the 2013 parliamentary elections, in which it retained its single seat.

== Election results ==
=== Chamber of Deputies elections ===
Election	Party leader	Votes	%	Seats	+/–	Government
2003 (Note: Run as part of the RPF Coalition.)	Alfred Mukezamfura	2,774,661	73.78%	3 / 80	New	Government coalition
2008	Alfred Mukezamfura	3,655,956	78.76%	1 / 80	▼2	Government coalition
2013	Agnès Mukabaranga		76.22%	1 / 80	0	Government coalition
2018	Agnès Mukabaranga	4,926,366	73.95%	1 / 80	0	Government coalition
2024	Agnès Mukabaranga	6,126,433	68.83%	0 / 80	▼1	Extra-parliamentary
