= Social Democratic Party (Rwanda) =

Political party in Rwanda

Social Democratic Party Parti Social Démocrate
- President: Vincent Biruta
- Founded: 1 July 1991
- Headquarters: Kigali
- Ideology: Social democracy
- Political position: Centre-left
- Chamber of Deputies: 5 / 80

Party flag
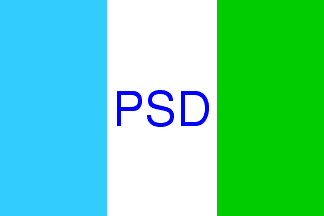

Website
- www.psd-rwanda.rw

The Social Democratic Party (French: Parti Social Démocrate; Kinyarwanda: Ishyaka Riharanira Demokarasi n'Imibereho Myiza y'Abaturage, lit. 'Party for Democracy and Social Welfare') is a centre-left social democratic political party in Rwanda. The party is seen as somewhat supportive of the Paul Kagame government.

== History ==
The party was established on 1 July 1991 by Félicien Gatabazi and Frédéric Nzamurambaho, and was nicknamed the "Party of Intellectuals". It formed a bloc opposing President Juvénal Habyarimana alongside the Liberal Party and the Republican Democratic Movement, but by the time of the Rwandan genocide, it was the only major party that Habyarimana had failed to split. The PSD's main leaders were killed in the morning of the first day of the genocide as Théoneste Bagosora sought to create a vacuum in order to seize power.

At the end of the genocide the party joined the national unity government. It supported President Paul Kagame in the 2003 presidential elections, and received 12% of the vote in the 2003 parliamentary elections, winning seven seats.

The party's vote share rose to 13% in the 2008 elections, as it retained its seven seats. In the 2010 presidential elections the party fielded Jean Damascene Ntawukuriryayo as its candidate; he received 5% of the vote, coming second to Kagame, who received 93%.

In the 2013 parliamentary elections the party again received 13% of the vote, winning seven seats. It was reduced to five seats in the 2018 elections.

== Election results ==
=== Presidential elections ===
Election	Party candidate	Votes	%	Result
2003	Supported Paul Kagame (RPF)	3,544,777	95.06%	Elected ✓
2010	Jean Damascene Ntawukuriryayo	256,488	5.15%	Lost ✗

=== Chamber of Deputies elections ===
Election	Votes	%	Seats	+/–	Position	Government
2003	463,067	12.31%	7 / 80	New	▲2nd	Support
2008	609,327	13.12%	7 / 80	0	2nd	Support
2013		13.03%	7 / 80	0	2nd	Support
2018	586,215	8.80%	5 / 80	▼2	2nd	Support
2024	767,143	8.62%	5 / 80	0	▼3rd	Support
