= Democratic Green Party of Rwanda =

Political party in Rwanda

- French name: Parti vert démocratique du Rwanda
- Kinyarwanda name: Ishyaka Riharanira Demokarasi no Kurengera Ibidukikije
- President: Frank Habineza
- Founded: 14 August 2009
- Membership: 500,000 (claimed)
- Ideology: Green politics Green liberalism Liberal democracy
- Political position: Centre to centre-left
- Regional affiliation: Federation of Green Parties of Africa
- International affiliation: Global Greens
- Chamber of Deputies: 2 / 80

Website
- www.rwandagreendemocrats.org

The Democratic Green Party of Rwanda (DGPR; French: Parti vert démocratique du Rwanda, PVDR; Kinyarwanda: Ishyaka Riharanira Demokarasi no Kurengera Ibidukikije, IRDKI) is a green political party in Rwanda, established in 2009. The party was registered in August 2013, but too late to contest the 2013 parliamentary elections. Its platform emphasizes unity, non-violence, social justice, participatory democracy, and calls for subsidized prices for agricultural produce. It believes that the unalienable rights of the people include "the right to life, liberty, peaceful assembly, expression, worship and the pursuit of happiness", and that these rights are granted by God.

== History ==
The party was established on 14 August 2009, and aimed to contest the 2010 presidential elections. However, it was prevented from registering. The party's vice-president, André Kagwa Rwisereka, was found beheaded during the election campaign. Green Party leaders in the US called on the Obama Administration to support an investigation into his murder and the allegations that it was politically motivated. President Paul Kagame and his ruling Rwanda Patriotic Front (RFP) has close ties to the US.

The party was finally registered in August 2013, but too late to contest the 2013 parliamentary elections.

On 17 December 2016, Frank Habineza was nominated as the party leader and flag bearer for the 2017 presidential elections. By doing this the party abandoned its earlier threat to boycott the election after its demands for electoral reforms were snubbed by the government. Habineza went on to finish third of the three candidates with just 0.5% of the vote. However, in the parliamentary elections the following year the party entered parliament after winning two seats.

== Electoral history ==
=== Presidential elections ===
Election	Party candidate	Votes	%	Result
2017	Frank Habineza	32,701	0.48%	Lost ✗
2024	Frank Habineza	44,479	0.50%	Lost ✗

=== Chamber of Deputies elections ===
Election	Party leader	Votes	%	Seats	+/–	Government
2018	Frank Habineza	302,778	4.55%	2 / 80	New	Opposition
2024	Frank Habineza	405,893	4.56%	2 / 80	0	Opposition
