= 2013 Rwandan parliamentary election =

Rwandan parliamentary election, 2013
- 16–18 September 2013
	First party	Second party	Third party
Party	RPF	PSD	PL
Seats before	36	7	4
Seats won	37	7	5
Seat change	▲1	-	▲1

Parliamentary elections were held in Rwanda between 16 and 18 September 2013. The result was a victory for the Rwandan Patriotic Front, which maintained its absolute majority in the Chamber of Deputies, winning 41 of the 80 seats.

== Electoral system ==
Of the 80 seats in the Chamber of Deputies, 53 were directly elected by closed list proportional representation with an electoral threshold of 5%. A further 27 seats were indirectly elected by local and national councils, including 24 reserved for women, two for representatives of youth and one for representatives of handicapped.

== Conduct ==
In the weekend preceding the election, on 13 and 14 September, two grenades exploded in a Kigali market. The Rwandan government blamed the Democratic Forces for the Liberation of Rwanda (FDLR), the remnants of the force responsible for the 1994 Genocide. Questions were asked about the credibility of the election as transparent, free and fair.

Voting was otherwise reported as orderly.

== Results ==
Party or alliance		Votes	%	Seats	+/–
RPF coalition	Rwandan Patriotic Front		76.22	37	+1
RPF coalition	Centrist Democratic Party		76.22	1	0
RPF coalition	Ideal Democratic Party		76.22	1	0
RPF coalition	Party for Progress and Concord		76.22	1	0
RPF coalition	Rwandan Socialist Party		76.22	1	0
Social Democratic Party			13.03	7	0
Liberal Party			9.29	5	+1
Social Party Imberakuri			1.46	0	New
Independents			1.46	0	0
Indirectly-elected members				27	0
Total				80	0
Total votes		5,881,874	–		
Registered voters/turnout		5,953,531	98.80		
Source: IPU, All Africa
