= Liberal Party (Rwanda) =

Political party in Rwanda

Liberal Party Parti Libéral
- Leader: Prosper Higiro
- Founded: 14 July 1991
- Headquarters: Kigali
- Ideology: Liberalism
- Political position: Centre
- Colors: Green, yellow
- Chamber of Deputies: 5 / 80

Website
- www.pl-rwanda.rw

The Liberal Party (Kinyarwanda: Ishyaka riharanira Ukwishyira Ukizana kwa Buri Muntu, lit. 'Party for Equality for Everyone'; French: Parti Libéral, PL) is a liberal political party in Rwanda led by Prosper Higiro.

== History ==
The party was established in 1991. Although it refused to join the government formed by Sylvestre Nsanzimana later in the year, it joined Dismas Nsengiyaremye's government in April 1992. As a result of its involvement with government, and efforts by associates of President Juvénal Habyarimana, the party split into pro- and anti-government factions.

It joined the Rwandan Patriotic Front-led government in 1994 after the end of the genocide. Prosper Higiro became leader of the party in 2001. In the 2003 parliamentary elections the party received 11% of the vote and won six of the 53 elected seats.

In 2007 Protais Mitali was elected leader of the party. A dispute over the conduct of the elections led to two MPs and five officials being expelled from the party. The 2008 parliamentary elections saw the party's vote share fall to 7.5% as it was reduced to four seats.

Higiro was nominated as the party's candidate for the 2010 presidential elections, receiving 1.4% of the vote. In the 2013 parliamentary elections the party received 9% of the vote, winning five seats. It was reduced to four seats in the 2018 parliamentary elections.

== Electoral history ==
=== Presidential elections ===
Election	Candidate	Votes	%	Result
2010	Prosper Higiro	68,235	1.37	Lost ✗

=== Chamber of Deputies elections ===
Election	Leader	Votes	%	Seats	+/–	Position	Status
2003	Prosper Higiro	396,978	10.56	6 / 80	New	3rd	Support
2008	Prosper Higiro	348,186	7.50	4 / 80	▼2	3rd	Support
2013	Prosper Higiro		9.29	5 / 80	▲1	3rd	Support
2018	Prosper Higiro	479,631	7.20	4 / 80	▼1	3rd	Support
2024	Prosper Higiro	770,896	8.66	5 / 80	▲1	▲2nd	Support
