= 2003 Rwandan presidential election =

- 25 August 2003
- Registered: 3,948,749
- Turnout: 96.55%
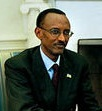

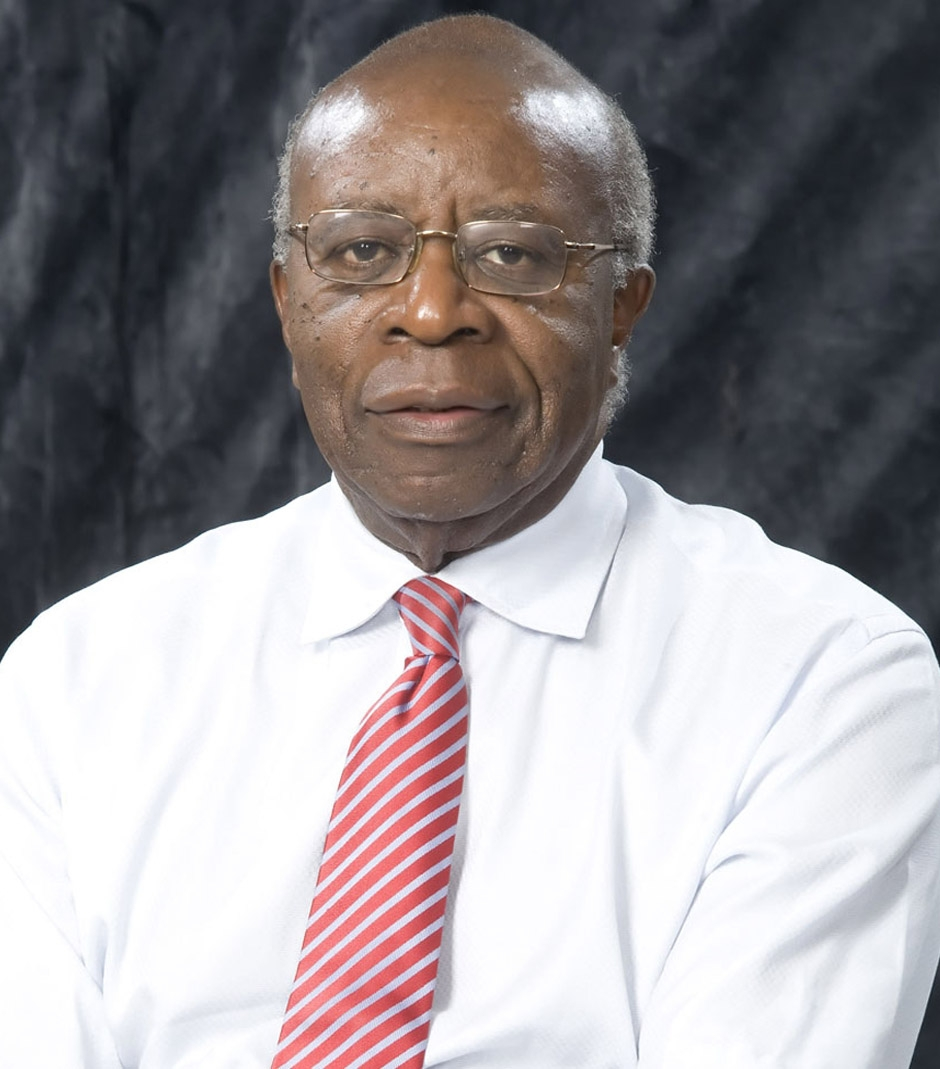
Nominee	Paul Kagame	Faustin Twagiramungu
Party	RPF	Independent
Popular vote	3,544,777	134,865
Percentage	95.05%	3.62%
President before election
Paul Kagame
RPF
Elected President
Paul Kagame
RPF

Presidential elections were held in Rwanda on 25 August 2003. They were the first direct presidential elections since the Rwandan Civil War and the first multi-party presidential elections in the country's history. Paul Kagame of the Rwandan Patriotic Front (RPF) was elected to a seven-year term with 95% of the vote.

The results were disputed by Faustin Twagiramungu, the main opposition candidate, who argued that "People were controlled, people were forced to vote. It’s not possible that we in the opposition got only 3.7% of the vote. There is something wrong." The elections were widely condemned as fraudulent by outside observers; according to the scholar Timothy Longman, "the Rwandan population experienced the elections not as a transition to democracy but as a series of forced mobilizations that ultimately helped to consolidate RPF rule." The international reactions were nevertheless muted, which, according to Filip Reyntjens, "reinforced the RPF in its conviction that things would blow over, which they did." In Reyntjens' view, "after failing Rwanda in 1994, the international community did so again in 2003 by allowing a dictatorship to take hold."

== Background ==
Prior to the elections a campaign was launched by the RPF to ban the Democratic Republican Movement (MDR), which was charged with "divisionism". This move was criticized by Human Rights Watch, which stated "If the MDR is dissolved, conditions for the elections will change even more dramatically. As the only party outside of the RPF with any substantial support, the MDR would be the only one able to seriously contest at least the legislative if not the presidential elections." The MDR was banned, and Faustin Twagiramungu was forced to run as an independent.

== Results ==
Candidate	Party	Votes	%
Paul Kagame	Rwandan Patriotic Front	3,544,777	95.05
Faustin Twagiramungu	Independent	134,865	3.62
Jean-Népomuscène Nayinzira	Independent	49,634	1.33
Total		3,729,276	100.00
Valid votes		3,729,276	97.82
Invalid/blank votes		83,291	2.18
Total votes		3,812,567	100.00
Registered voters/turnout		3,948,749	96.55
Source: African Elections Database
