= Senate (Rwanda) =

Upper house of the Rwandan Parliament

The upper house of the Parliament of Rwanda (Kinyarwanda: Inteko Ishinga Amategeko; French: Parlement) is the Senate (Sena/Sénat). The Senate has 26 members elected or appointed for eight-year terms: 12 elected by provincial councils, eight appointed by the President of the Republic to ensure the representation of historically marginalized communities, four by the National Consultative Forum of Political Organizations, and two elected by the staff of the universities (one public, one private). Additionally, former presidents can request to become a member of the Senate.

The Senate was established in 2003.

== Presidents ==
Name	Took office	Left office	Notes
Vincent Biruta	August 2003	October 2011	
Jean-Damascène Ntawukuriryayo	10 October 2011	14 October 2014	
Bernard Makuza	14 October 2014	17 October 2019	
Augustin Iyamuremye	17 October 2019	9 December 2022	
François-Xavier Kalinda	9 January 2023	Incumbent	

== See also ==
- First legislature of the Rwandan Senate, 2003–2011
- Second legislature of the Rwandan Senate, 2011–2019
- Third legislature of the Rwandan Senate, 2019–2027
