= Rwandan Patriotic Front =

Dominant political party in Rwanda

Rwandan Patriotic Front Front Patriotique Rwandais
- President: Paul Kagame
- Secretary-General: Christophe Bazivamo
- Founder: Fred Rwigema
- Founded: December 1979; 46 years ago (RANU) December 1987; 38 years ago (RPF)
- Headquarters: Kigali
- Ideology: Civic nationalism; Economic liberalism; Social conservatism; Self-proclaimed: Third Way; Until 2000s: Socialism; Left-wing nationalism; Republicanism; Communism (Note: influenced by the Maoist NRA) (factions)
- Political position: Center-right; Until 2000s: Left-wing
- Colours: Sky blue
- Chamber of Deputies: 37 / 80

Party flag

Website
- rpfinkotanyi.rw

The Rwandan Patriotic Front (RPF–Inkotanyi; French: Front patriotique rwandais, FPR) is the ruling political party in Rwanda.

The RPF was founded in December 1987 by Rwandan Tutsi exiled in Uganda because of the ethnic violence that had occurred during the Rwandan Hutu Revolution in 1959–1962. In 1990, the RPF started the Rwandan Civil War in an attempt to overthrow the Hutu-dominated Habyarimana government. Later the Rwandan genocide occurred, and ended on 4 July with the RPF conquest of the entire country. The RPF have ruled the country since then as a de facto one-party state. RPF leader Paul Kagame has been president of Rwanda since his election in 2000.

Since 1994, RPF rule has been characterized by political repression, relative stability, and economic growth. Among other policies implemented by the government are the non-recognition of ethnic identities and a prohibition of "genocide ideology", including discussion of ethnic differences. Though officially nonsectarian, as of 2021, a majority of officials in the RPF-led government are Tutsi.

== History ==
=== Before the RPF ===
Rwanda is one of the most densely populated countries in Africa, with over 14 million people living in a comparatively small territory of 26,338 square kilometers. Unlike other African countries, the current state of Rwanda was partly based on the pre-colonial Kingdom of Rwanda, governed by a Tutsi monarchy. When the European colonialists arrived in Rwanda (Germans from 1899 to 1916 and Belgians from 1916 to 1962), the country lost all political, economic, and cultural independence. The colonial rulers chose Rwanda's leaders and set laws that suited their interests.

The colonial rulers employed a divide-and-conquer strategy, spreading the idea that Rwandans:

1. Came from different places
2. Did not enter the nation as a group
3. Lacked equal intelligence
4. Should not work in the same fields
5. Should not receive the same education

This strategy increased divisions between Tutsi, Hutu, and Batwa.

In the early 1950s, Rwandans fought for their independence alongside other African countries. Since Tutsis made up the majority of those who fought for Rwanda's independence, the Belgians started to propagate the idea that Tutsis were outsiders who had originated in Abyssinia or modern-day Ethiopia.

=== Rwandese Alliance for National Unity ===
The Rwandese Alliance for National Unity (RANU) was created in December 1979 in Nairobi, Kenya, by young Rwandan Tutsi refugee intellectuals, most of whom had grown up in Uganda. The RANU political organization was established to discuss a possible return to Rwanda. Though primarily a forum for intellectual discussion, it became militant after Milton Obote's election in 1980, resulting in many Tutsi refugees joining Yoweri Museveni in fighting the Ugandan Bush War.

Following the overthrow of Idi Amin in 1979, Obote denounced Museveni's National Resistance Army (NRA) as being composed of Banyarwanda. Subsequently, a failed attempt to force all Rwandan refugees into refugee camps in February 1982 resulted in a massive purge, driving 40,000 refugees back into Rwanda. Rwanda declared that they recognized only 4,000 of these as Rwandan nationals, while Uganda declared that they would take back only 1,000. The remaining 35,000 were left in a legal limbo along the border region for years, and many refugee youths left to join the National Resistance Army.

=== RPF founding ===
After the Museveni government was formed in 1986, Fred Rwigema, a Rwandan refugee commander, was appointed Uganda's deputy minister of defense and deputy army commander-in-chief, second only to Museveni in the military chain of command for Uganda. Paul Kagame was appointed acting chief of military intelligence. A large number of NRA officers were Rwandan refugees because they had joined the rebellion early, and thus had accumulated more experience. The contributions of the Rwandans in the Ugandan Bush War were immediately recognized by the new government. Six months after taking power, Museveni reversed the decades-old legal regime and declared that Rwandans who had resided in Uganda would be entitled to citizenship after 10 years. In December 1987, RANU held its seventh congress in Kampala and renamed itself the Rwandan Patriotic Front (RPF). Its principles include "Unity, Sovereignty and Security, Economy, Democratic Leadership, Fighting Corruption, Eliminating All Causes of Refugee Status, International Relations, Social Welfare, and Fighting Genocide and Its Ideology". Dominated by exiled Rwandan intellectuals and military officers, this new RPF was significantly stronger and more ambitious than RANU had been.

=== Rwandan Civil War ===
On 1 October 1990, the Rwandan government led by Juvénal Habyarimana with the National Republican Movement for Democracy and Development (MRND) party which was known to rule with pro-Hutu policies, was invaded by the Rwanda Patriotic Army (RPA), the military wing of RPF led by Major-General Fred Gisa Rwigema, initiating the Rwandan Civil War. The RPA incursion was initially successful, despite the death of Fred Rwigema the following day. Paul Kagame, who had been doing military studies in the United States, returned to take over the RPA. Thereafter the RPA resorted to guerrilla attacks, focusing on the Byumba and Ruhengeri areas, gaining control of much of the north of the country in 1992. Negotiations between the RPF and the Rwandan government led to the signing of the Arusha Accords in 1993, resulting in RPF personnel and other refugees being allowed to return to the country.

=== 1994 genocide in Rwanda ===
On 6 April 1994, President Juvénal Habyarimana's plane was shot down near Kigali International Airport, killing him and Cyprien Ntaryamira, the President of Burundi. The assassination was likely perpetrated by either Hutu extremists or the RPF. The downing of the plane served as the catalyst for the Rwandan genocide, which began within a few hours. Over approximately 100 days, more than 500,000 Tutsi were killed and an estimated 250,000 to 500,000 women were raped. The RPF invaded Rwanda with its military wing, fighting government forces and gradually taking control of the country. The Rwandan genocide was completely stopped when Kigali was captured by the RPF army on 4 July.

=== Post-1994 genocide in Rwanda governance ===
After the RPF stopped the genocide and took control of the country, in 1994, it formed a government of headed by president Pasteur Bizimungu. The vice president and de-facto leader of the RPF, Paul Kagame, became Minister of Defense and vice-president. President Bizimungu served for six years and resigned from government in 2000. He formed his political party, the Party for Democratic Renewal, in 2001 and was arrested in 2002. Having received a 15-year prison sentence for crimes including inciting ethnic violence and embezzlement, Bizimungu was released with a pardon from President Kagame in 2007. In February 1998 Kagame was elected president of the RPF, replacing Alexis Kanyarengwe, and in March 2000 he became the national president.

Following a constitutional referendum in 2003, Kagame was elected president with 95% of the vote. The RPF formed a coalition with several smaller parties, which received 74% of the vote in the 2003 parliamentary elections, winning 40 of the 53 elected seats in the Chamber of Deputies. The coalition won 42 seats in the 2008 parliamentary elections, and Kagame was re-elected as president in 2010 with 93% of the vote. The 2013 parliamentary elections saw the RPF-led coalition win 41 seats. In 2017, Kagame was re-elected for a third term with 98.8 percent of the vote. He was sworn in for another seven-year term on 18 August 2017, and again in 2024.

In the post-genocide era, RPF as a ruling party established Rwanda's national unity and democratic government. Under the three consecutive Kagame presidencies, the Rwandan government has developed various national programs to improve infrastructure and facilitate justice in the wake of the genocide, including community work holidays (Umuganda) and gacaca courts.

== Leadership ==
=== Current leaders ===
Paul Kagame is the current Chairman of the RPF, after being re-elected with other members of the National Executive Committee (NEC) during the 16th party's national congress that met on 2 April 2023. The elected committee is responsible for the day-to-day management of the party activities and will serve a five-year term.

In July 2024, Rwanda held elections, confirming Paul Kagame's victory with 99.18% of the votes on July 15. Opposition parties were severely repressed, facing arbitrary arrest or imprisonment, with some members being "found dead in mysterious circumstances". Nonetheless, the ruling party saw its representation in parliament decrease, securing 37 of 53 directly elected seats, down from 40. Only two candidates were allowed to run against Paul Kagame, while others were barred from participating. The Rwandan Electoral Commission stated that the other candidates lacked the necessary documents to run in the 2024 election. The Democratic Green Party retained two seats, with the remainder going to the Rwandan Patriotic Front.

=== National leaders ===
- Chairman: Paul Kagame
- Vice-chairwoman: Consolee Uwimana
- Secretary General: Wellars Gasamagera

=== General commissioners ===
- Tito Rutaremara
- Jeanne D'Arc Gakuba
- Abdul Karim Harerimana
- Jean Nepomuscene Sindikubwabo
- Nelly Mukazayire
- Assoumpta Mbarushimana
- Celestin Kabano
- Sandrine Uwimbabazi Maziyateke
- Yves Iradukunda
- Charles Habonimana
- Christelle Kwizera
- Gaspard Twagirayezu
- Marie Rose Mureshyankwano
- Jean Nepo Abdallah Utumatwishima
- Juliana Muganza

== Ideology ==
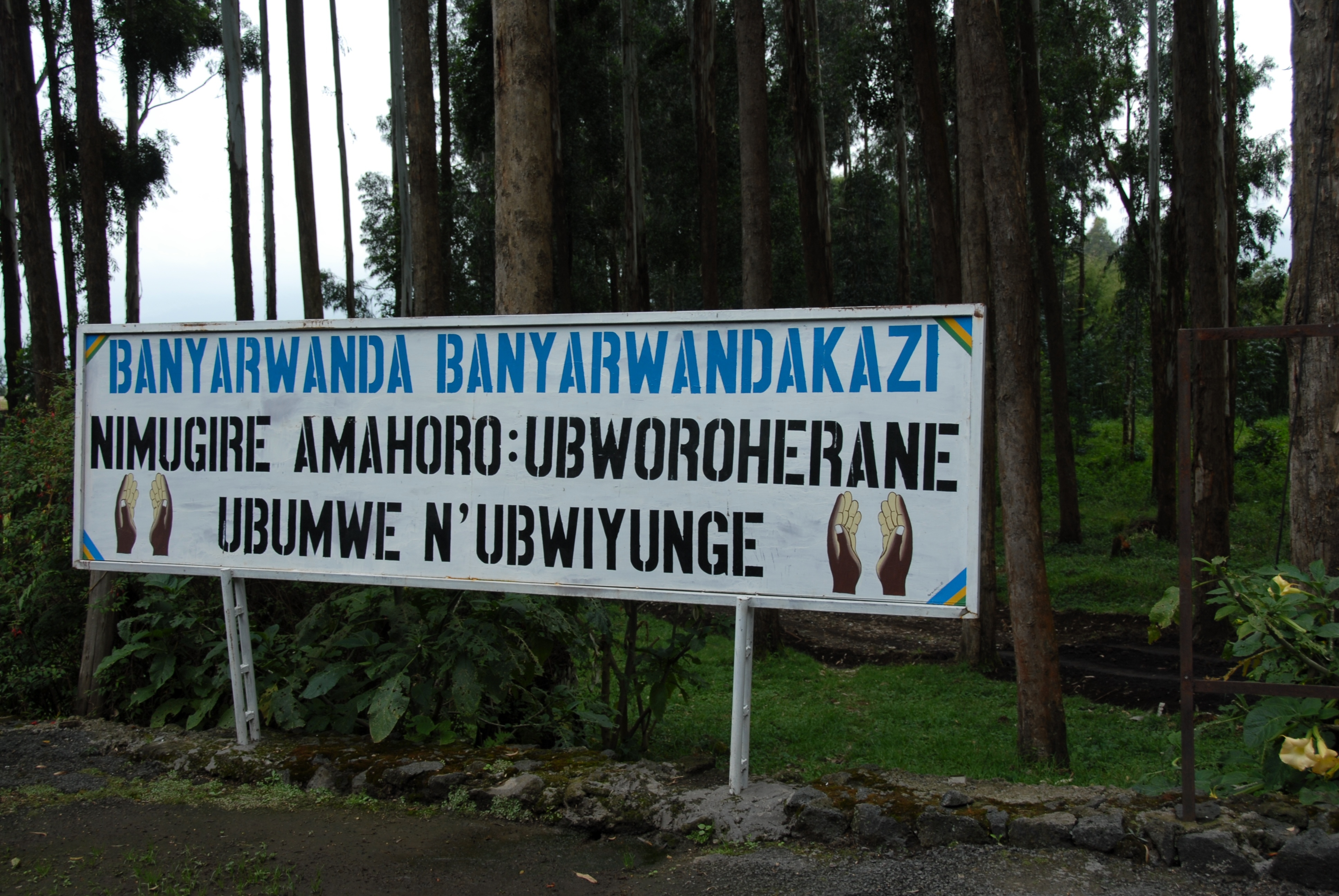
Sign encouraging Rwandans to "Promote unity and reconciliation"

The RPF sees rapprochement among Rwandans as a prerequisite for socioeconomic growth, establishment of national peace, and the restoration of dignity to every Rwandan. According to the party, it adheres to the Third Way.

== Electoral history ==
=== Presidential elections ===
Election	Party candidate	Votes	%	Result
2003	Paul Kagame	3,544,777	95.06%	Elected ✓
2010	Paul Kagame	4,638,560	93.08%	Elected ✓
2017	Paul Kagame	6,675,472	98.80%	Elected ✓
2024	Paul Kagame	8,822,794	99.18%	Elected ✓

=== Chamber of Deputies elections ===
Election	Party leader	Votes	%	Seats	+/–	Government
2003 (Note: Run as part of the RPF Coalition.)	Paul Kagame	2,774,661	73.78%	33 / 80	New	Government coalition
2008	Paul Kagame	3,655,956	78.76%	36 / 80	▲3	Government coalition
2013	Paul Kagame	4,483,164	76.22%	37 / 80	▲1	Government coalition
2018	Paul Kagame	4,926,366	73.95%	36 / 80	▼1	Government coalition
2024	Paul Kagame	6,126,433	68.83%	37 / 80	▲1	Government coalition
