= Eugene Mussolini =

Rwandan politician (born 1977)

Member of the Chamber of Deputies
- Incumbent
- Assumed office 2019
- Preceded by: Rusiha Gaston
- Constituency: Disabled community

Personal details
- Born: December 24, 1977 (age 48)
- Education: Kigali Independent University (MBA)

Eugene Mussolini (born December 24, 1977) is a Rwandan politician. Since 2019, Mussolini has served as a member of the Chamber of Deputies, holding the parliamentary seat reserved for people with disabilities.

== Early life and education ==
According to Mussolini's profile on the official website of the Chamber of Deputies, he was born on December 24, 1977. He received a Master of Business Administration degree from the Kigali Independent University.

== Early career ==
A survivor of the Rwandan genocide, Mussolini criticized France's role in the Rwandan genocide. Prior to his election, Mussolini served on the Gasabo District council.

Mussolini, who is physically impaired, previously worked at the National Council of People with Disability. He formerly worked at the Association of Landmine Survivors and Amputees of Rwanda (ALSAR), which advocates. for the ratification of the Convention on Cluster Munitions.

== Parliamentary career ==
In the 2018 Rwandan parliamentary election, he was elected as the disabled representative in the Chamber of Deputies. Mussolini defeated outgoing MP Rusiha Gaston by a margin of 75.5% to 14.5% of the vote.

=== Tenure ===
In 2022, Mussolini was one of five MPs to introduce legislation to give Rwandans access to contraceptive services from the age of fifteen. The proposed bill, which was introduced with support from Gamariel Mbonimana, Speciose Ayinkamiye, Phoebe Kanyange, and Alice Muzana, was ultimately tabled.

In 2023, Mussolini described the Democratic Forces for the Liberation of Rwanda (FDLR) as a "terrorist group of genocidaires extending their genocide ideology in the DRC".
