= Third legislature of the Rwandan Senate =

The third legislature of the Rwandan Senate commenced in 2019 and will end in 2027.

The Senate is the upper house of the Parliament of Rwanda (Kinyarwanda: Inteko Ishinga Amategeko; French: Parlement) and has 26 members:

- 12 senators elected by the councils
- 8 senators appointed by the President
- 4 senators designated by the Forum of Political organizations
- 1 senator elected by public universities
- 1 senator elected by private universities

== Members of the Senate ==
The current members of the Senate are as follows:

Name	Provenance	Province
Adrie Umuhire	Elected in Southern Province	Southern Province
Alvera Mukabaramba	Appointed by the President of the Republic	Kigali City
Augustin Iyamuremye	Appointed by the President of the Republic	Kigali City
Charles Uyisenga	Appointed by the Consultative Forum of Political Parties	Kigali City
Chrysologue Karangwa	Appointed by the President of the Republic	Kigali City
Consolée Uwimana	Appointed by the President of the Republic	Kigali City
Cyprien Niyomugabo	Elected in Public Institutions of Higher Learning	Kigali City
Emmanuel Havugimana	Elected in Western Province	Western Province
Ephrem Kanyarukiga	Representing Private Universities and Higher Education Institutions	Kigali City
Espérance Nyirasafari	Appointed by the President of the Republic	Kigali City
Faustin Habineza	Elected in Northern Province	Northern Province
François Habiyakare	Appointed by the President of the Republic	Kigali City
Fulgence Nsengiyumva	Elected in Eastern Province	Eastern Province
George Mupenzi	Elected in Eastern Province	Eastern Province
Hadija Ndangiza Murangwa	Appointed by the Consultative Forum of Political Parties	Kigali City
Innocent Nkurunziza	Elected in Southern Province	Southern Province
Jeanne d' Arc Mukakalisa	Appointed by the Consultative Forum of Political Parties	Kigali City
John Bonds Bideri	Elected in Eastern Province	Eastern Province
Juvénal Nkusi	Appointed by the Consultative Forum of Political Parties	Eastern Province
Laetitia Nyinawamwiza	Elected in Northern Province	Northern Province
Lambert Dushimimana	Elected in Western Province	Western Province
Margaret Nyagahura	Appointed by the President of the Republic	Kigali City
Marie Rose Mureshyankwano	Elected in Western Province	Western Province
Pélagie Uwera	Elected in Southern Province	Southern Province
William Ntidendereza	Elected in City of Kigali	Kigali City
Zephyrin Kalimba	Appointed by the President of the Republic	Kigali City

== See also ==
- First legislature of the Rwandan Senate
- Second legislature of the Rwandan Senate
