= Second legislature of the Rwandan Senate =

The second legislature of the Rwandan Senate commenced in 2011 and ended in 2019.

The Senate is the upper house of the Parliament of Rwanda (Kinyarwanda: Inteko Ishinga Amategeko; French: Parlement. According to the 2003 Constitution of Rwanda, the Senate includes 26 members:

- 12 senators are elected by the councils
- 8 senators are appointed by the President
- 4 senators designated by the Forum of Political organizations
- 1 senator elected by public universities
- 1 senator elected by private universities

== Members of the Senate ==
Name	Provenance	District
Emmanuel Bajana	Public universities	Gasabo
Thérèse Bishagara Kagoyire	Western Province	Nyarugenge
Evariste Bizimana	Northern Province	Gasabo
Jeanne d'Arc Gakuba	Kigali City	Gasabo
Fatou Harerimana	Political parties representative	Gasabo
Zephyrin Kalimba	Appointed by president	Kicukiro
Chrysologue Karangwa	Appointed by president	Kicukiro
Gertrude Kazarwa	Eastern Province	Gasabo
Bernard Makuza	Appointed by president	Huye
Jacqueline Muhongayire	Appointed by president	Huye
Jeanne d' Arc Mukakalisa	Political parties representative	Gasabo
Perrine Mukankusi	appointed by Forum of Political organizations	Nyarugenge
Marie Claire Mukasine	Southern Province	Gasabo
Narcisse Musabeyezu	Northern Province	Burera
Apollinaire Mushinzimana	Western Province	Gasabo
Gallican Niyongana	Southern Province	Gasabo
Laurent Nkusi	Private universities	Gasabo
Jean-Damascène Ntawukuriryayo	Appointed by president	Nyanza
Margaret Nyagahura	Appointed by president	Gasabo
Michel Rugema	Eastern Province	Gasabo
Tito Rutaremara	Appointed by president	Nyarugenge
Célestin Sebuhoro	Eastern Province	Kayonza
Richard Sezibera	Southern Province	Huye
Jean Népomucène Sindikubwabo	Western Province	Rutsiro
Consolée Uwimana	appointed by Forum of Political organizations	Gasabo
Charles Uyisenga	appointed by Forum of Political organizations	Kicukiro

== See also ==
- First legislature of the Rwandan Senate
- Third legislature of the Rwandan Senate
