= Gertrude Kazarwa =

Rwandan politician

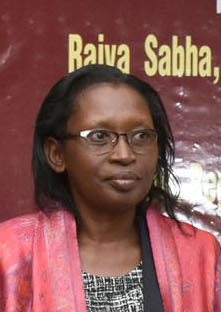

Speaker of the Chamber of Deputies
- Incumbent
- Assumed office 14 August 2024
- Preceded by: Donatille Mukabalisa

Member of the Senate of Rwanda
- In office 2014–2019

Personal details
- Born: 28 December 1964 (age 61)
- Party: Liberal
- Education: Maastricht School of Management (MBA); University of Lay Adventists of Kigali (LL.B)

Gertrude Kazarwa (born 28 December 1964) is a Rwandan lawyer and politician who has been the Speaker of the Chamber of Deputies since 2024, as a member of the Liberal Party. Prior to her tenure as speaker was a member of the Senate representing the Eastern Province from 2014 to 2019.

== Early life ==
Gertrude Kazarwa was born on 28 December 1964. She graduated with a bachelor's degree in management from the Kigali Independent University, with a Bachelor of Laws degree from the University of Lay Adventists of Kigali, and with a Master of Business Administration from the Maastricht School of Management.

== Career ==
In 2011, Kazarwa was a part-time lecturer at Kigali Independent University. Gertrude founded Bright Stars Foundation Academy School and was its managing director from October 2019 to July 2024.

Donatille Mukabalisa resigned from the Senate in order to become a member of the Chamber of Deputies. On 29 August 2014, Kazarwa was elected in a by-election to fill Mukabalisa's vacant senate seat representing the Eastern Province for the remaining five years of Mukabalisa's term. She served until 2019. During her tenure in the senate she was deputy chair of the Political Affairs and Good Governance committee. She is a member of the Liberal Party.

Kazarwa defeated Pie Nizeyimana with 73 votes to become Speaker on 14 August 2024. She is the third woman to serve as speaker. She selected Mussa Fazil Harerimana and Beline Uwineza to serve as her deputy speakers.

== Personal life ==
Kazarwa is married and is the mother of three children.

== Works cited ==
=== News ===
- "Who is Gertrude Kazarwa, the third woman to be the Speaker of the Rwandan Parliament?". Hobe News. 15 August 2024. Archived from the original on 29 June 2025.
- Kagina, Alice (14 August 2024). "Rwanda: Kagame Tasks New MPs to End Disorder in Churches". The New Times. Archived from the original on 29 June 2025.
- Rwembeho, Stephen (31 August 2014). "Eastern Province elects new senator". The New Times. Archived from the original on 29 June 2025.

=== Web ===
- "Bureau". Parliament of Rwanda. Archived from the original on 29 June 2025.
- "Madame KAZARWA Gertrude yatorewe kuba umusenateri mushya". National Electoral Commission. 29 August 2014. Archived from the original on 20 February 2025.
- "Rwanda". Inter-Parliamentary Union. Archived from the original on 29 June 2025.
