= Judith Kanakuze =

Rwandan politician and women's rights activist (1959–2010)

- Kanakuze in 2007
- Born: 19 September 1959; Rusizi District, Ruanda-Urundi
- Died: 7 February 2010 (aged 51)
- Known for: Rwandan women's rights activism
- Political party: Rwandan Patriotic Front (from 2008)

Judith Kanakuze (19 September 1959 – 7 February 2010) was a Rwandan politician and women's rights activist best known for passing legislation against gender-based violence, including Rwanda's first legal definition of rape, and contributing constitutional gender quotas that required women's representation in governmental bodies. She worked in multiple fields, including nutrition and civil service, before becoming a prominent leader of women after the 1994 Rwandan genocide, in which she lost most of her extended family. Kanakuze founded the early women's organization Réseau des Femmes and represented women's interests at the Arusha Accords and on Rwanda's committee to establish a constitution. The gender quotas that required women to compose at least 30 percent of governmental bodies subsequently quickly spurred women's participation to exceed the quotas in parliament. She was elected to Parliament in 2003 and reelected in 2008. During her terms, she presided over the Rwanda Women Parliamentary Forum.

== Early life and career ==
Judith Kanakuze was born 19 September 1959, in Rusizi District, Rwanda. She studied demography in college and graduated with a bachelor's degree. Kanakuze worked as a schoolteacher for two years beginning in 1980 and later became a nutritionist. She served as National Supervisor of Rwanda Nutritional Centres for four years beginning in 1986, after which she coordinated a household energy saving project with SNV Netherlands Development Organisation. In 1992, she officiated studies and research with the Ministry of Public Works. During this time, Kanakuze represented women and children in the Arusha Accords. She also led a feminist organization, Twese Hamne (Pro-Femmes). She lived through the 1994 Rwandan genocide, in which most of her extended Tutsi family was murdered in a Kibuye church in west Rwanda, where they had gone for sanctuary.

After the conflict, she returned to Rwanda from a refugee camp in Goma to reopen a women's credit union that specialized in microfinance and also offered educational and conflict resolution programming. Kanakuze founded the early women's organization Réseau des Femmes, for which she was a consultant in the late 1990s.

Kanakuze, by this time known as a leader for women's rights in Rwanda, was selected to serve on the country's 2001 Constitutional Commission as a gender equality advocate and one of three women on the 12-person panel. She contributed numerous gender-related clauses towards the constitution, the most significant of which created gender quotas in which women must compose at least 30 percent of seats on Rwanda's decision-making bodies. Women's civil society organizations and individual women supplemented Kanakuze to convince the other commission members. Rwandan women began to enter male-controlled committees and were recognized on issues other than gender. By 2003, women held nearly half of the seats in Parliament and Kanakuze was elected to one of them. The next year, she presided over the Rwanda Women Parliamentary Forum, which designed laws to target gender equality within the government. Kanakuze served as a member of the Parliamentary Standing Committee on Gender and Family Promotion. Her most significant legislative act was a 2008 law against gender-based violence, including domestic violence and rape. It established the definition of rape in Rwandan law and marked the first legislation introduced by parliamentarians—instead of the executive branch—since the 2003 election. Kanakuze was reelected in 2008 under the Rwandan Patriotic Front political party.

She fell ill during a meeting in December 2009 and did not recover. Kanakuze died on 7 February 2010, at the age of 51. Parliament closed for a day to mourn and honor her memory.
