= Anitha Mutesi =

Rwandan politician

President of the Rwanda Women Parliamentary Forum
- Incumbent
- Assumed office 2016
- Preceded by: Ignacienne Nyirarukundo

Member of the Chamber of Deputies
- Constituency: Women's representative, Kayonza District (Eastern Province)

Personal details
- Occupation: Politician

Anitha Mutesi (also spelled Anita Mutesi) is a Rwandan politician. She has sat in the Chamber of Deputies, the lower house of the Parliament of Rwanda, as a women's representative for Kayonza District in the Eastern Province, and in 2016 she was elected president of the Rwanda Women Parliamentary Forum (FFRP), the cross-party caucus of the country's women parliamentarians.

== Political career ==
Mutesi stood in the 2013 parliamentary election as a women's representative candidate for Kayonza District. She subsequently served in the Chamber of Deputies, where 24 of the 80 seats are reserved for women chosen by specific electoral colleges drawn along the country's administrative lines.

In March 2016 Mutesi was elected president of the Rwanda Women Parliamentary Forum. According to the forum, the vote took place on 18 March 2016 and she succeeded Ignacienne Nyirarukundo. The leadership election was held at a general assembly in Bugesera District, and the new committee was chosen to steer the forum for two and a half years. Speaking shortly after her election, Mutesi said the forum had helped many Rwandan women move into public administration and decision-making roles.

Founded in 1996 by twelve women parliamentarians, the FFRP works to build solidarity among women across party lines and to push for the review or repeal of laws that discriminate against women.

As the deputy associated with Kayonza, Mutesi has joined local government and community events in the district, among them a national Umuganura harvest-thanksgiving celebration held in its Murundi sector.
