= Pelagie =

Pelagie or Pélagie may refer to:

- Pelagie (name), or Pélagie, a feminine given name derived from the French equivalent of Pelagia
- Pelagie [peˈlad͡ʒe], the Italian name of the Pelagian Islands
- Pélagie (musical), a musical by Allen Cole and Vincent de Tourdonnet

== See also ==
- Sainte-Pélagie Prison, a prison in Paris, used from 1790 to 1899
- Pélagie-la-Charrette, a 1979 novel by Antonine Maillet
