= Donatille Mukabalisa =

Rwandan lawyer and politician (1960–2026)

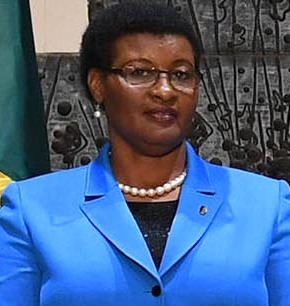
- Mukabalisa in 2017

Speaker of the Chamber of Deputies of Rwanda
- In office 3 October 2013 – 14 August 2024
- Preceded by: Rose Mukantabana
- Succeeded by: Gertrude Kazarwa

Personal details
- Born: 30 July 1960 Nyamata, Rwanda
- Died: 30 July 2026 (aged 66) Kigali, Rwanda
- Party: Liberal Party of Rwanda (2009–2026)

Donatille Mukabalisa (30 July 1960 – 30 July 2026) was a Rwandan lawyer and politician, notably the Speaker of the Chamber of Deputies. She was elected Speaker of the Rwandan parliament in 2013 after the country's national elections. Mukabalisa was designated as a senator by the National Consultative Forum of Political Organisations (NFPO) on 19 September 2024.

== Life and career ==
Mukabalisa was born in Nyamata on 30 July 1960. She taught law at the Kigali Independent University.

She worked at the World Health Organization at the end of her studies and for 16 years at the United Nations Development Program.

Mukabalisa decided to become involved in politics in 2000, after the Rwandan Genocide and the transition period that followed the arrival of Paul Kagame as President. She said that the years spent in a country where "human rights were seriously damaged" got her to make a decision to start her fight against injustice. She joined the Liberal Party of Rwanda which at the time was not the ruling party but supported Kagame's Rwandan Patriotic Front party. She was elected to the parliament of Rwanda after the elections of October 2003. She remained in that position from 2003 until 2008. From 2011 to 2013, she became a senator. She then returned as a Member of Parliament after the 2013 legislative elections and as a candidate for the presidency of the Chamber of Deputies in spite of the few seats held by her party.

== Death ==
On 30 July 2026, Mukabalisa died at King Faisal Hospital in Kigali, where she had been undergoing treatment. She was 66.
