= Marcelline Basigayabo =

Rwandan politician

Marcelline Basigayabo (born 1979) is a Rwandan politician who is currently serving as a member of the Chamber of Deputies in the Parliament of Rwanda. Other past positions include Executive Secretary of Rwankonjo Cell in local governance.

== Early life and education ==
Basigayabo was born in 1979 in Rwanda's Cyumba sector. She has a bachelor's degree in rural development.

== Career ==
- From 2018–present: Member of Parliament
- From 2006 to 2018: Executive Secretary of Rwankonjo Cell
- From 2008 to 2009: Worked in agronomist activities in Cyumba Sector
