= Habineza =

Habineza is a surname. Notable people with the surname include:

- Faustin Habineza (born 1959), Rwandan politician
- Frank Habineza (born 1977), Rwandan politician
