= Chantal Mbakeshimama =

Rwandan politician

Chantal Mbakeshimama is a Rwandan politician, currently a member of the Chamber of Deputies in the Parliament of Rwanda.
