= Theoneste Begumisa Safari =

Rwandan politician

Theoneste Begumisa Safari is a Rwandan politician, currently a member of the Chamber of Deputies in the Parliament of Rwanda.
