= Diogene Bitunguramye =

Rwandan politician

Diogene Bitunguramye is a Rwandan politician, currently a member of the Chamber of Deputies in the Parliament of Rwanda.
