= Gamariel Mbonimana =

Rwandan politician (born 1980)

Dr. Gamariel Mbonimana
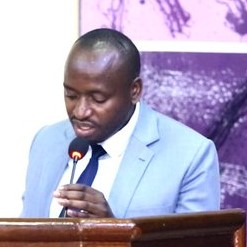
- Dr. Gamariel Mbonimana

Member of the Chamber of Deputies in the Parliament of Rwanda
- Incumbent
- Assumed office September 19, 2018

Personal details
- Born: 15 October 1980 (age 45) Kamonyi District
- Party: Liberal Party
- Education: Holy State University (PhD in Education); NIBM (Masters in Logistics & Supply Management); Kabale University (Masters in Education); University of Kibungo (Bachelors in Psychopedagogy)
- Occupation: Lecturer, politician, academic administrator
- Known for: Politics, Public Administration, leadership, academic administration

Gamariel Mbonimana (born 15 October 1980) is a Rwandan politician who served as a member of the Chamber of Deputies in the Parliament of Rwanda from 2018 to 2022. He is a member of Liberal Party political party in Rwanda. Formerly he served as a full time senior lecturer at University of Kigali.

== Early life and educational background ==
Mbonimana was born on 15 October 1980 in Kamonyi District. Mbonimana attended Bunyonga Primary School (1987-1995), Ecole Secondaire de MBOGO for ordinary level (1995-1998), joined Institut Technique de Rutobwe (ITER) (1998-2001) for a secondary teaching certificate. He graduated with Bachelor of Arts in Psychopedagogy from University of Kibungo (Rwanda), a Masters of Arts in Educational management from Kabale University (Uganda), a Master of Business Administration in Logistics and Supply chain Management from National Institute of Business Management, India and a Doctor of Philosophy in Education Management from Holy States University United States.

== Career ==
=== Lecturer ===
He started as a teacher at Rusave Primary School (September 2001-December 2003), Kayonza Modern Secondary School teaching Psychology, Sociology, Philosophy and Political Education (January 2004-December 2005), as a Dean and teacher at Institut Don Bosco Kabarondo (January 2009-May 2013). From April 2014, he served as a Part timer lecturer at Mount Kenya University Kigali campus. From January 2015 to March 2016 served as a senior lecturer and as the Head of Department of Education at Mahatma Gandhi University Rwanda. In March 2015, he joined University of Kigali where he served in various positions such as a coordinator of Post Graduate Diploma in Education, Head of Department of Education programs as an Acting Dean of Postgraduate School (January 2017-August 2017) as an Associate Dean PostGraduate school (August 2017 to June 2018) and served as a full time senior lecturer and Associate Dean, School of Postgraduate at University of Kigali. While as a lecturer, Dr. Mbonimana lectured Psychoperspective of social development, Educational Guidance and Counseling, Tests, Measurements and Evaluation, Historical foundations of Education, Psychology, Pedagogy, Philosophy, Sociology, Research Methodology, Human resource management, Organizational behavior, Communication skills, Personality development, Principles of Management Theories and Principles of Management in Education, Foundation of education, Financial resource administration and management, Personnel Management and Administration, Academic Affairs Management And Administration, Programme Mgt., Curriculum and Administration of Higher Education, Effective Teaching and Learning in Higher Education, Student welfare management and administration, Research methodology, Educational Policy and Planning Procurement and Supply chain management, Local and international procurement, Warehousing and inventory management, Logistics and Supply chain management, Operation quality logistics, Planning for procurement and supply chain management, Negotiations and contract management, Risk management and supply chain management, Public policy and management among others.

=== Politics ===
On 4 September 2018, he was elected as a member of parliament of the Chamber of Deputies in the Parliament of Rwanda and on 19 September 2018 he sworn in. He is a member on Education, Technology, culture and Youth in the Parliament of Rwanda. He belongs to Liberal Party political party in Rwanda. On 28 May 2019, the Bureau of the Chamber of Parliament appointed him in Francophonie Parliament Association as a committee member on Education, Communication and Cultural Affairs.

Driving under influence scandal

In the morning of 14 November 2022, the Rwandan Parliament received and accepted the resignation of MP Mbonimana for personal reasons. The next day, Mbonimana released a public apology on Twitter. It is reported that MP Mbonimana was arrested six times by Police and found to be driving with alcohol levels beyond legal limit.

== Published works ==
He has published the finding of his research on Education policy & management, Supply chain interconnectedness, Warehousing and inventory management, Logistics and Politics in books and other peer publications journals hence cited with an H-Index of 7 with 21 citations in over 12 peer-reviewed journal in international relation publications.

=== Listed Publications ===
- Chantal Mukarugira and Jean Baptiste Mbanzabugabo 'From Traditional to Technology Based Education in Primary Schools of Kicukiro District, Rwanda', International Journal of Novel Research in Education and Learning, Vol. 5, Issue 3 (May–June 2018). ISSN 2394-9686
- MBONIMANA, G. (2018), Influence of Textbooks and Computers on Students’ Performance in kayonza district, Rwanda. Paper published in International Journal of Scientific and Education Research (IJSER). Paper ID: IJSER088. Volume 2, issue 2, 2018
- MBONIMANA, G. (2018), School Infrastructures and Students’ Performance in Kayonza district, Rwanda. Paper published in International Journal of Social Science and Humanities Research (IJSSHR). Vol. 6, Issue 2, April 2018 – June 2018.
- MBONIMANA, G. (2018), Challenges facing nine years basic education schools on students’ performance in Kayonza district, Rwanda. Paper published in International Journal of Social Science and Humanities Research (IJSSHR). Vol. 6, Issue 2, April 2018 – June 2018
- MANIRARORA A., MBONIMANA G., MUGABO D. (2019). Analysis of the way the genocide against the Tutsi affected women in Ngororero district. Paper published in American Research Journal of Humanities & Social Sciences (ARJHSS, E-ISSN: 2378-702X), vol. 02, issue 05, May 2019.
- MUKARUGIRA C., MBONIMANA G., MBANZABUGABO, J.B (2019). From traditional to technology based education in primary schools of Kicukiro district, Rwanda. Vol. 5, Issue 3, May 2018 – June 2018. Paper published in International Journal of Novel Research in Education and Learning.
- SHYIRAMUNDA T., MBONIMANA G., MUGABO D.( 2019). The role played by IPRC Musanze as a HLI in the development of its surrounding community in Musanze district.
- NAMBAJIMANA C., MBONIMANA, G. (2019). Self-employment by TVET graduates young people from technical and vocational education and training in Rwanda. Paper published in International Journal of Social Science and Humanities Research (IJSSHR), ISSN 2348-3164 (online) Vol. 7, Issue 2, pp: (922-929), Month: April - June 2019.
- MBONIMANA, G., NGENDAHIMANA, J.C. (2021). Contribution of extracurricular activities to academic performance in secondary schools: a case of catholic secondary schools in Musanze district (2015 -2018). Paper published in International Journal of Recent Research in Social Sciences and Humanities (IJRRSSH). ISSN 2349-7831. Vol. 8, Issue 2, pp: (30-37), Month: April - June 2021.
- MBONIMANA, G., KWIZERA, P.V. (2021). Rwandan community impacts on the quality of education: a case of Nyamagabe district. Paper published in International Journal of Novel Research in Education and Learning (IJNREL), ISSN 2394-9686, Vol. 8, Issue 3, pp: (12-19), Month: May - June 2021.
- MBONIMANA. G. & UWIMANA, A. (2021). An assessment of technical, vocational, education and training on Rwanda labor market: a case of NPD Ltd. Paper published in International Journal of Social Science and Humanities Research (IJSSHR). ISSN 2348-3156 (Print). ISSN 2348-3164 (online). Vol. 9, Issue 2, pp: (257-264), Month: April - June 2021.
- MBONIMANA, G., UWAMBAJIYERA, C. (2021). Effect of human resource planning on managerial performance. Paper published in International Journal of Recent Research in Commerce Economics and Management (IJRRCEM). ISSN 2349-7807. Vol. 8, Issue 2, pp: (44-52), Month: April - June 2021
- MBONIMANA. G. & MUJYAMBERE, G. (2021). A study of parental engagement on school performance in Nyarugenge district (2014-2019). Paper published in International Journal of Social Science and Humanities Research. IJSSHR). ISSN 2348-3156 (Print). ISSN 2348-3164 (online). Vol. 9, Issue 2, pp: (265-273), Month: April - June 2021.

== Committee member ==
Dr. Mbonimana has served on various committees such as a class representative of Psycho-Pedagogy at INATEK(January 2006-December 2006), as an examiner in Rwanda Education Board of Secondary School marking Psychology, Sociology, Philosophy and General Paper(2012-2014), as a pedagogical committee member for Rwanda Peace Education Program (January 2015-December 2015). He is a committee member on Education, Technology, culture and Youth in the Parliament of Rwanda. He was appointed as a member of Special Committee in charge of investigating the unsolved issues in Agriculture(April–July 2018), Member and President of Rwanda Parliamentarian Network on Population and Development, a member of Rwanda Anti-genocide Parliamentary Forum, a member of Rwanda African Parliamentary Network Against Corruption (since 2018) and a member of Kamonyi District Council since 2018.

== Personal life ==
Dr. Mbonimana is married to Ingabire Marie Claire and they have 3 children; Mbonimana Keza Ornella, Mbonimana Gwiza Briella and Mbonimana Nshuti Elouan. His hobbies include Playing football, Reading Bible as well other general books and watching documentary movies. He belongs to Liberal Party political party in Rwanda.
