= Therese Bishagara Kagoyire =

Rwandan politician (1952–2019)

Therese Bishagara Kagoyire (25 December 1952 – 8 July 2019) was a Rwandan politician. From 2011 to 2019, she served as a member of the Rwandan Senate. She was a member of the Rwandan Patriotic Front (RPF).

== Early life and education ==
Bishagara grew up in Democratic Republic of the Congo where she attained a bachelor’s degree. She had a master's degree in molecular biology sciences.

== Career ==
Bishagara researched in the Programme de la Lutte Contre le SIDA et les Infections Sexuellement Transmissibles and Permanent Executive Secretariat of the National AIDS Commission, which together form Burundi's national HIV/AIDS center (1995–1996). She was a Director of Kigali Health Institute (1996–2004). She was a part-time lecturer at National University of Rwanda (1999–2003).

She worked as Resident Advisor Features group International /Measure Evaluation /USAID from 2006 to 2007. She was a technical advisor in Save the Children UK in 2006, and also in PSI – Features for VIH prevention (2005–2006). From 2008 to 2011, Bishagara was the national program manager of Jhpiego/MCHIP International, an NGO affiliated with Johns Hopkins University (USAID).

She held board member positions at White Ribbon Alliance for Safe Motherhood (2007–2011), Université Libre de Kigali (2008–2011) and Rwanda Local Development Support Funds (2007–2011). She was a member of Association d'Exécution des Travaux d'Intérêt Public (ASSETIF). She served as president of Profemmes Twese -Hamwe and COCAFEM /Great Lakes (2007–2011).

Bishagara joined the Second legislature of the Rwandan Senate in 2011, as a representative of the Western Province.

== Death ==
Bishagara fell ill in April 2019. She died on 8 July 2019 at Johns Hopkins Hospital, Baltimore, Maryland, U.S. She was buried at Rusororo Cemetery in Kigali.
