= Pelagie (name) =

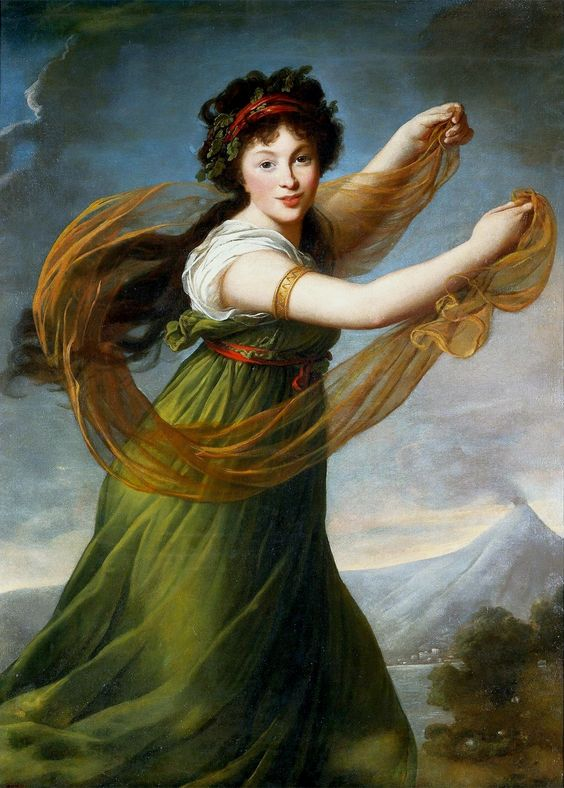
"Portrait of Pelagie Sapiezyna née Potocka" by Élisabeth Vigée-Le Brun

Pelagie (or Pélagie) is a name, a French form of the Greek Pelagia, The name refers to a saint of the early Christian Church called Pelagia.

== People ==
- Pelagie Doane (1906–1966), American illustrator and writer
- Pélagie Gbaguidi (born 1965), Beninese artist
- Pelagie Faribault (1783–1847), Dakota women in early Minnesota
- Pélagie Uwera (born 1974), Rwandan politician
- Joseph-Marie-Pélagie Havard (1790–1838) French bishop, missionary in Vietnam
- Nora Coton-Pélagie (born 1988), French footballer

== Fictional characters ==
- Pélagie LeBlanc, the title character of Pélagie-la-Charrette, a novel by Antonine Maillet, and of its adaptation Pélagie, a Canadian musical first produced in 2004

== See also ==
- Pelagia (disambiguation)
- Marina (given name)
