= Ndangiza =

Ndangiza is a surname. Notable people with the surname include:

- Fatuma Ndangiza (born 1968), Uganda women's rights advocate
- Madina Ndangiza, Rwandan politician
