= Ernest Kamanzi =

Rwandan politician

Ernest Kamanzi is a Rwandan politician, currently a member of the Chamber of Deputies in the Parliament of Rwanda. Elected at age 28, Kamanzi has stated that one of his major goals is to tackle the youth unemployment crisis in Rwanda.
