= Iphigenie Mukandera =

Rwandan politician

Member of the Chamber of Deputies
- In office 2018–2024

Personal details
- Occupation: Politician

Iphigenie Mukandera is a Rwandan politician. She was elected to the Chamber of Deputies, the lower house of the Parliament of Rwanda, in 2018, and during that term sat as deputy chairperson of the chamber's standing committee on foreign affairs and cooperation. Before moving into national politics, she had worked in local government as a district vice-mayor.

== Career ==
Mukandera first held office at the local level. By 2010 she was the vice-mayor in charge of social affairs of Ngoma District, in Rwanda's Eastern Province. In that role she announced plans for the district's official genocide memorial, to be built in the Rukumberi area, and opened a fundraising drive for the project in Kigali.

Following the 2018 Rwandan parliamentary election, Mukandera entered the Chamber of Deputies. When the incoming legislature organised its nine standing committees in October 2018, she was chosen as deputy chairperson of the Committee on Foreign Affairs and Cooperation, serving under the committee's chairperson, Fidèle Rwigamba.
