= Annoncée Manirarora =

Rwandan politician

Annoncée Manirarora (born June 30, 1976) is a Rwandan politician, currently a member of the Chamber of Deputies in the Parliament of Rwanda.

Manirarora is a member of the Rwandan Patriotic Front. Her province is the Western Province and her district is Ngororero District.

Manirarora previously worked for the United Nations and has a M.S. in Genocide Studies and Prevention.
