= Cécile Murumunawabo =

Rwandan politician

Member of the Chamber of Deputies
- Incumbent
- Assumed office 2013
- Constituency: City of Kigali

Personal details
- Born: 1968 (age 57–58) Rwanda
- Party: Rwandan Patriotic Front (RPF)
- Other political affiliations: Secretary of the RPF Women's Congress
- Education: Master's in Development Studies
- Occupation: Politician
- Known for: Women's political leadership

Cécile Murumunawabo (born 1968) is a Rwandan politician. She was elected to the Chamber of Deputies in the Parliament of Rwanda in 2013. She is a member of the Rwandan Patriotic Front (RPF), representing the City of Kigali and is secretary of the RPF women's congress.

== Early life ==
Murumunawabo was born in 1968 and holds a Masters in development studies.

== Career ==
Murumunawabo is a member of the Rwandan Patriotic Front (RPF) and was elected to the Chamber of Deputies in the Parliament of Rwanda in 2013. Before, she worked in the office of the First Lady of Rwanda. In 2013, Murumunawabo was made secretary of the RPF women's congress. She was re-elected as secretary in 2019 with 85.3 percent of the vote.
