= Emmanuel Karemera =

Rwandan politician

Emmanuel Karemera is a Rwandan politician, currently a member of the Chamber of Deputies in the Parliament of Rwanda.

== See also ==
- Politics of Rwanda
