= Solange Ayanone =

Rwadan Journalist

- Born: Solange Ayanone
- Education: Kigali University
- Known for: Journalism
- Children: 4

Solange Ayanone is a Rwandan journalist and trainer.

Ayanone was the programs director for Isango Star and trainer for Syfia International. Ayanone is the Vice President of the Rwanda Journalists Association and an MBA graduate at the University of Kigali.
