= Valens Muhakwa =

Rwandan politician

Valens Muhakwa is a Rwandan politician, currently a member of the Chamber of Deputies in the Parliament of Rwanda.
