= Barthélemy Karinijabo =

Rwandan politician

Barthélemy Karinijabo is a Rwandan politician, currently a member of the Chamber of Deputies in the Parliament of Rwanda.
