= Francis Karemera =

Rwandan politician

Francis Karemera is a Rwandan politician, currently a member of the Chamber of Deputies in the Parliament of Rwanda.
