= Eugène Barikana =

Rwandan politician

Eugène Barikana (born January 5, 1967) s a Rwandan politician, currently a member of the Chamber of Deputies in the Parliament of Rwanda.

Barikana represents Kigali and is a member of the Rwandan Patriotic Front. His district is Nyarugenge District.

Barikana is Catholic.
