= Winifrida Mpembyemungu =

Rwandan politician

Winifrida Mpembyemungu (born 1972) is a Rwandan politician, currently a member of the Chamber of Deputies in the Parliament of Rwanda.

== Biography ==
Mpembyemungu is the former mayor of Musanze. In 2013 her house was attacked with explosives, resulting in a baby being killed and two others injured. In 2015 six people received lifetime jail sentences, for this and other FDLR-sponsored terrorist attacks.

In April 2016, assailants attacked her home at night, resulting in a man being shot and killed by security forces.

In June 2018, Mpembyemungu narrowly beat former MP Marie Therese Murekatete to gain the Rwanda Patriotic Front women's ticket for Musanze District.
