= Jeanne d'Arc Uwimanimpaye =

Rwandan politician

Member of the Chamber of Deputies
- Incumbent
- Assumed office 2008
- Constituency: Gatsibo District (2018–present); Eastern Province (2008–2018)

Personal details
- Born: 15 August 1978 (age 47)
- Party: Rwandan Patriotic Front

Jeanne d'Arc Uwimanimpaye (born 15 August 1978) is a Rwandan politician. She has been a member of the Chamber of Deputies since 2008. From 2013 to 2018, she served as a Deputy Speaker of the Chamber.

== Life ==
Jeanne d'Arc Uwimanimpaye graduated in Economics from the National University of Rwanda. Before joining Parliament, she worked as a secondary school teacher, and in local government as a district internal auditor and Public Relations officer.

Uwimanimpaye entered Parliament in the 2008 Rwandan parliamentary election, as one of the six women's representatives for Eastern Province. In 2010, she travelled to the United Kingdom as a Commonwealth election observer of the 2010 United Kingdom general election.

In the 2013 parliamentary election, Uwimanimpaye was returned to the Chamber of Deputies as a Women's representative for Eastern Province. In October 2013, she was elected Deputy Speaker in charge of Government Oversight and Legislation, receiving 70 votes out of a possible 80. As Deputy Speaker, she introduced the motion to allow President Kagame to run for a third term in office, after a petition had attracted 3.8 million signatures:

The petitioners hail president Kagame for having stopped the genocide and bringing quick economic recovery.

Uwimanimpaye was selected as a RPF-Inkotanyi candidate for the 2018 parliamentary election, and elected to represent Gatsibo District in Eastern Province. She stepped down as Deputy Speaker, and was succeeded by Edda Mukabagwiza of RPF-Inkotanyi. In September 2019, Uwimanimpaye pressed for an investigation into financial irregularities around tenders issued by the Rwanda Agriculture Board, and was also critical of procurements made by the Rwanda Cooperative Agency.
