= Faustin Habineza =

Senator of Northern Province, Rwanda
- Incumbent
- Assumed office 10 September 2019

Personal details
- Born: 10 October 1959 (age 66) Burera District, Rwanda
- Party: Rwanda Patriotic Front
- Education: University of KwaZulu-Natal (PhD in mathematics education); University of Sherbrooke (Masters of science in mathematics); University of Rwanda (Bachelor of Sciences in mathematics and physics)
- Occupation: Lecturer, politician, academic administrator
- Known for: Leadership, academic administration, politics

Faustin Habineza (born 10 October 1959) is a Rwandan mathematician, educator, and politician.

Habineza is a senator of Northern province in Parliament of Rwanda since September 2019. Previously, he served in education as a lecturer for various local universities such as former Kigali Institute of Education now University of Rwanda, College of Education and INES-Ruhengeri.

From 2011 to 2016 Habineza was deputy chairperson of Kigali city council. And he also served as chairperson of Burera District council from March 2016 to October 2019.

== Early life and education ==
Habineza was born on 10 October 1959 in Burera, Rwanda. He attended primary education at Gaseke primary school in Burera (1966–1973), secondary education at Petit Séminaire de Rwesero in Gicumbi (1973–1980). In 1980, Habineza joined former National University of Rwanda (NUR) now University of Rwanda (UR) where he graduated with Bachelors of Science in Mathematics and Physics in 1983.

In 1983 Habineza further enrolled in University of Sherbrooke, Canada for post graduates degree, he graduated with Masters of Science in mathematics in 1987. From 2004, he was pursuing studies for PhD of Mathematics Education at University of KwaZulu-Natal, South Africa where he graduated in 2010. In 2013, Habineza obtained postgraduate certificate in teaching and learning in Higher Education (PGCLTHE) from former Kigali Institute of Education (KIE) now University of Rwanda, College of Education.

== Academic career ==
Habineza served in Rwanda ministry of education (MINEDUC) as head of IT and data processing division, and director of teacher management and development between April 1998 and June 2002.

From July 2002 to September 2014 Habineza served as lecturer and head of department of Integrated Sciences at former Kigali Institute of Education now University of Rwanda, College of Education. Afterwards he moved to the Institute of Applied Sciences Ruhengeri (INES- Ruhengeri), Northern Province of Rwanda to serve as Senior lecturer and Dean of faculty of applied fundamental sciences from April 2015 up to his electoral as senator of Northern province in Third legislature of the Rwandan Senate in October 2019.

== Personal life ==
Habineza is married with 3 children and 2 grandchildren ^{(as of October 2023)}.

== Publications ==
- Education in Rwanda. Rebalancing Resources to Accelerate Post-Conflict Development and Poverty Reduction, 2003.
- Developing first-year mathematics student teachers' understanding of the concepts of the definite and the indefinite integrals and their link through the fundamental theorem of calculus: an action research project in Rwanda, 2010.
- A case study of analysing student teachers' concept images of the definite integral P38-54, 2013.
- An exploratory survey of students' attitudes towards Mathematics at INES-Ruhengeri in Rwanda, 2014.
- Developing Students Understanding of the Concept of Integral: The Definite and the Indefinite Integrals and Their Link Through the Fundamental Theorem of Calculus, 2017.
- Identification of possible strategies for implementing PBL at INES-Ruhengeri: A preliminary study, 2018.
- Levels of Secondary School Students' Attitudes and Anxiety Towards Mathematics in Musanze District in Rwanda: An Exploratory Study, P345-349, 2018.
- An exploratory survey of undergraduate students' attitudes towards research in Ines-Ruhengeri in Rwanda, 2018.
- Secondary School Students' differences on attitude and anxiety towards mathematics by gender and schools' status and type in Musanze District in The Republic of Rwanda, 2019.
- Prevalence of Swine Gastrointestinal Parasites in Nyagatare District, Rwanda, 2020.

== See also ==
- Third legislature of the Rwandan Senate - Wikipedia
