= Jean Pierre Celestin Habiyaremye =

Rwandan politician

Jean Pierre Celestin Habiyaremye is a Rwandan politician, currently a member of the Chamber of Deputies in the Parliament of Rwanda.
