= Marie Mediatrice Izabiliza =

Rwandan politician

Marie Mediatrice Izabiliza is a Rwandan politician, currently a member of the Chamber of Deputies in the Parliament of Rwanda.
