= Emmanuel Bugingo =

Rwandan politician

Emmanuel Bugingo is a Rwandan politician, formerly a member of the Chamber of Deputies in the Parliament of Rwanda. He did not seek re-election in 2023, and was appointed the High Commissioner of the Rwandan diplomatic mission to Zambia in 2024, starting his service on May 22nd of that year.
