= Jean Pierre Hindura =

Rwandan politician

Jean Pierre Hindura is a Rwandan politician, currently a member of the Chamber of Deputies in the Parliament of Rwanda.
