= Médiatrice Ahishakiye =

Rwandan politician

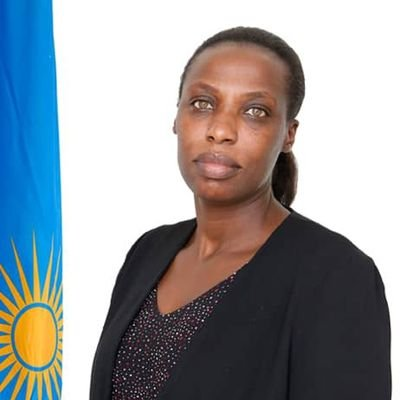
- Mediatrices AHISHAKIYE member of Rwanda Parliament

Member of the Chamber of Deputies
- Incumbent
- Assumed office 2018
- Constituency: Women's representative, Southern Province (Huye District)

Personal details
- Born: 1978 (age 47–48) Rwanda
- Education: Bachelor's degree in Psycho-pedagogy
- Occupation: Politician, educator
- Profession: Teacher, head teacher, district council member

Médiatrice Ahishakiye (born 1978 in Rwanda) is a Rwandan politician, currently a member of the Chamber of Deputies in the Parliament of Rwanda.

Ahishakiye represents Huye District in the Southern Province.

Ahishakiye has previously worked as a teacher in different schools, a head teacher in secondary school, and served as a secretary of the Gisagara District council, and as a member of the Gisagara District council.

In the 2018 parliamentary election, Ahishakiye was elected to the Chamber of Deputies as a women's representative in the Parliament of Rwanda.

== Education ==
She has a Bachelors' degree in Psycho-pedagogy.

== Career ==
- From 2018 up to now: Member of Parliament
- From 2011-2018: Member of District Council
- From 2011-2016: In charge of laws at SNF (District level)
- From 2011-2016: Secretary of District Council
- From 2009-2011: Chair Person of Sector Council
- From 2009-2018: Head Teacher
- From 2001-2010: Chairperson of Gacaca Court in Muhororo Sector
- From 2000 -2003: Teacher at EP MUHORORO.
