= Elie Ndisanze =

Rwandese Social Entrepreneur

- Born: January 11, 1992 (age 33); Kigali, Rwanda
- Education: Kigali Independent University; Bachelors in Computer Sciences
- Occupation(s): Social entrepreneur, digital marketer, talent manager,
- Known for: Co-creator of Autism Aid App
- Title: Founder, Autism Ambassadors of Rwanda
- Children: 1
- Website: ndisanze.com

Elie Ndisanze (born 11 January 1992) is a Rwandese social entrepreneur and the founder of Autism Ambassadors of Rwanda. Based in the United States, he is the developer of the Autism Aid App.

== Early life ==
Ndisanze was born in the capital city of Kigali to Antoine Barayasesa and Louise Uwumuremyi. He attended Gisozi Primary School and Lycee de Ruhengeri Secondary School. He further pursued his bachelor's degree in computer sciences from Kigali Independent University, Rwanda.

== Career ==
In 2014, Ndisanze founded the Autism Ambassadors of Rwanda, an autism awareness organisation focused on promoting autism awareness and improving the lives of autistic people through technology. The Autism Aid provides alternative and augmentative communication and healthcare resources for autistic children living in Rwanda. In 2021, he introduced a music contest dubbed Show Me Your Talent where upcoming artists are unearthed and supported to grow their careers and to give them a platform to turn them into established artists.
