= Christine Muhongayire =

Rwandan politician

Member of the Chamber of Deputies
- Incumbent
- Assumed office 2008
- Constituency: Nyaruguru District, Southern Province

Personal details
- Born: 1978 (age 47–48) Rwanda
- Party: Rwandan Patriotic Front
- Education: National University of Rwanda
- Profession: Politician, Lawyer
- Known for: Women's rights advocacy, gender equality policies
- Committees: Chair, Committee on Social Affairs

Christine Muhongayire (born 1978) is a Rwandan politician, currently a member of the Chamber of Deputies in the Parliament of Rwanda.

Muhongayire represents the Southern Province and is a member of the Rwandan Patriotic Front. Her district is Nyaruguru District.

Muhongayire is the head of the Committee on Social Affairs in the Chamber of Deputies.
