= Christine Bakundufite =

Rwandan politician and economist

Christine Bakundufite (born September 29, 1970) is a Rwandan politician and economist. She currently serves as a member of the Parliament of Rwanda's Chamber of Deputies for Gatsibo District in Eastern Province.

Bakundufite was elected to parliament in 2018. She previously worked as a headmistress, accountant, and accountant specialist.

== Education background ==
She has MBA in Finance

== Her Work /Important Functions ==
- From 2018 up to now: Member of Parliament
- From 2012-2018: Accountant Specialist at NAEB/PRICE
- From 2011-2012: In charge of Budget at NAEB
- From 2005-2011: Accountant at OCIR – CAFÉ
- From 2003-2005: Headmistress at Groupe Scolaire Bumba
