= Marie Claire Mukasine =

Rwandan politician

Marie Claire Mukasine (born in 1959) is a Rwandan lawyer, politician and civil servant. From 2011 to 2019 she was a member of the Senate of Rwanda, and has served as a permanent secretary in Rwanda's Ministry of Infrastructure. From 2020 to 2023 she had served as the Chairperson of the National Commission for Human Rights in Rwanda (NHCR). Since October 2023, she is the ambassador to Japan.

== Education ==
Mukasine holds a bachelor's degree in law, two master's degrees in management and public administration, and a PhD in law.

== Career ==
Mukasine has served in various leadership positions such as the executive secretary for Haguruka, a charity promoting and defending the rights of women and children. She has served as a permanent secretary in the Rwandan Ministry of Gender and Family Promotion. She has also been the director general of Rwanda Investment Group (RIG), and director general of the insurance company Sonarwa. In 2013 she was director of the National Insurance Corporation.

In 2011 Mukasine was elected to the Rwandan Senate as the representative for Southern Province, and served as senator until 2019. In 2017 she was amongst senators calling for stalled regional development projects to be fast-tracked. She was a member of the Senatorial Standing Committee on Political Affairs and Good Governance, and in 2018 highlighted the need to plan reintegration of former prisoners convicted of genocide:

There is need to look at both sides. The former inmates need to be prepared but members of community who will receive them and live with them need to be prepared for it too.

Mukasine has also served as president of the Rwanda chapter of African Parliamentarians Network Against Corruption (APNAC).

On 29 June 2020, Mukasine was sworn in as the Chairperson of the National Commission for Human Rights in Rwanda (NHCR). In October 2020 she asked Parliament to increase the NHCR's budget and to provide it with permanent residence in Kigali.

On 20 October 2023, Mukasine was appointed as the ambassador-designate to Japan.
