= Hadija Ndangiza Murangwa =

Rwandan politician

Hadija Ndangiza Murangwa (born 1975) is a Rwandan politician. She was a consultant in charge of strategy and institutional stability at the Institute of Certified Public Accountants of Rwanda (ICPAR). She is a senator in the Third legislature of the Rwandan Senate appointed by the Rwanda National Forum of Political Parties Organizations (NFPO). She was elected from the Ideal Democratic Party.

== Education ==
Murangwa holds a master’s degree in International Business Law from McGill University, Montreal, Canada.

== Career ==
Murangwa was a member of the Kigali International Arbitration Center (KIAC) with a Certificate of Associate of The Chartered Institute of Arbitration (London).

She was a consultant in charge of strategy and institutional stability at the Institute of Certified Public Accountants of Rwanda (ICPAR).

She also served on various boards including the National Bank of Rwanda (BNR), the Development Bank of Rwanda, the Military Medical Insurance (MMI) and the Rwanda Biomedical Centre (RBC).
