= Mussa Fazil Harerimana =

Rwandan politician

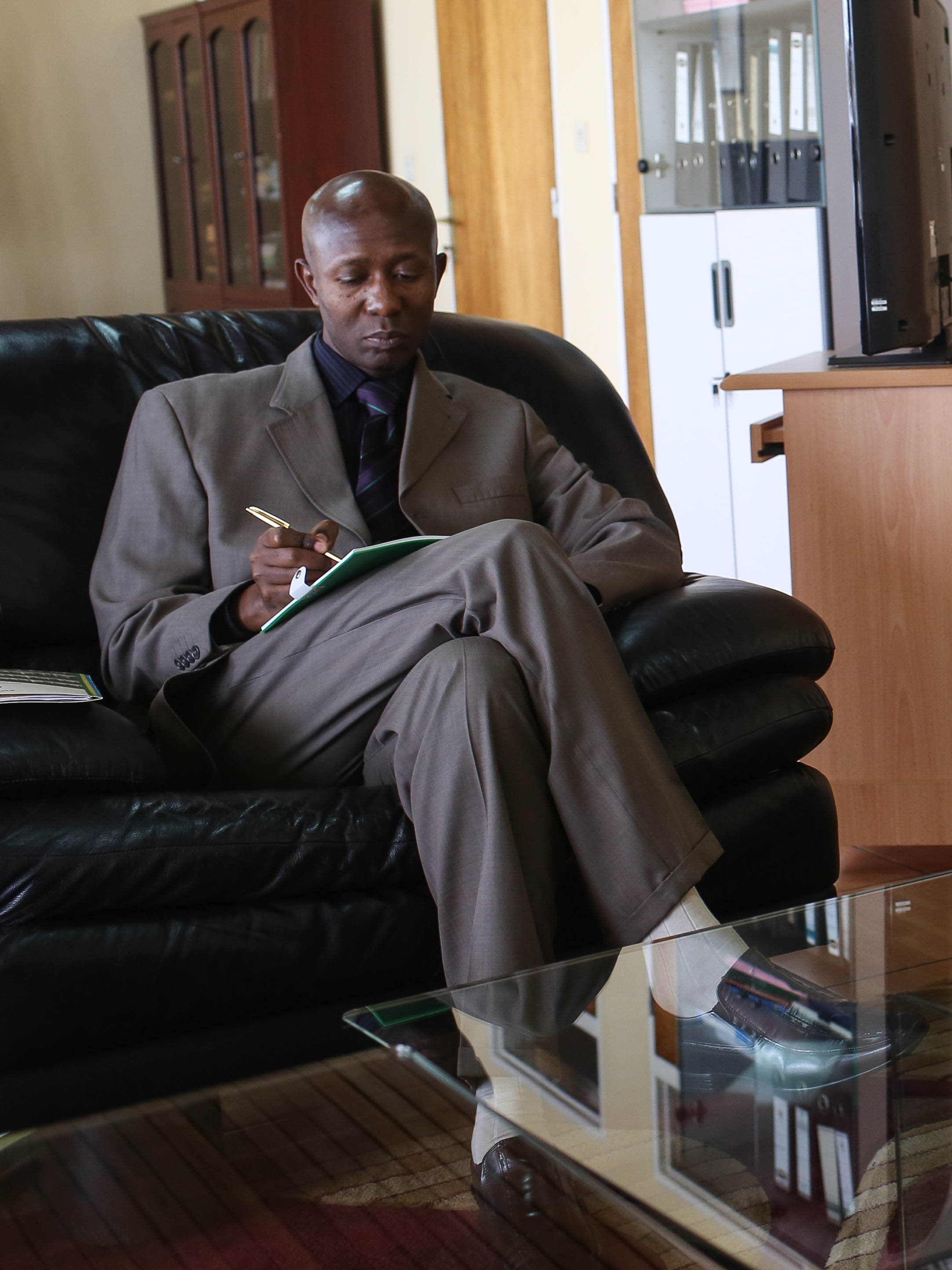
Musa Fazil Harerimana (2014)

Sheikh Mussa Fazil Harerimana is a Rwandan politician, currently a member of the Chamber of Deputies in the Parliament of Rwanda.
