= Phoebe Kanyange =

Rwandan politician

Phoebe Kanyange is a Rwandan politician, currently a member of the Chamber of Deputies in the Parliament of Rwanda. In September 2016 she replaced Christine Mukabunani as spokesperson of the National Consultative Forum of Political Organisations.
