= Laetitia Nyinawamwiza =

Rwandan academic and politician

Laetitia Nyinawamwiza (born 1972) is a Rwandan academic and politician. She has held several academic administrative positions, and since 2019 has served as a member of the Senate of Rwanda, representing the Northern Province.

== Life ==
Laetitia Nyinawamwiza has a PhD in animal production (aquaculture). From 2009 to 2011 she was Head of Department of Animal Production within the Faculty of Agriculture at the National University of Rwanda, and in 2010 she became a Senior Lecturer in the College of Agriculture. From 2011 to 2013 she was Vice Rector in charge of Academic Affairs and Research at the Higher Institute of Agriculture and Animal Husbandry, ISAE-Busogo. From 2012 to 2013 she was Ag. Rector at ISAE-Busogo.

n October 2013 President Kagame appointed her as the Principal of College of Agriculture, Animal Sciences and Veterinary Medicine. In 2018 she responded to student complaints at the lack of infrastructure at the college, acknowledging the problem and saying that the college had appealed to the government for financial help.

From 2012 to 2019 Nyinawamwiza was a Member of the Board of Directors of Rwanda's National Council of Higher Education. From 2013 to 2015 Nyinawamwiza was a member of the audit committee of the East African Council of High Education. She was deputy chair of the Board of Directors of the Institute of Applied Sciences (INES-Ruhengeri) from 2012 to 2019, and deputy chair of board of directors of the National Industrial Research and Development Agency (NIRDA) from 2016 to 2019.

From 2018 to 2019 Nyinawamwiza was on the board of directors of Rwanda Mountain Tea, managing Rubaya Nyabihu Tea Company Ltd and Kitabi Tea Company Ltd.

In 2019 Nyinawamwiza was one of two candidates elected as Senator for Northern Province. In November 2019, speaking in Musanze District, she called on parents to ensure that their children were productively occupied over the school holidays.

== Awards ==
Nyinawamwiza won an Africa's Most Influential Women in Business and Government award at the CEO Global Africa Awards 2017.
