= Elisabeth Mukamana =

Rwandan politician

Member of the Chamber of Deputies
- In office 2018–2024

Personal details
- Party: Party for Progress and Concord

Elisabeth Mukamana is a Rwandan politician. She represented the Southern Province in the Chamber of Deputies. She was the vice chairperson of the Committee on Political Affairs and Gender.
