= Chamber of Deputies (Rwanda) =

Lower house of Rwanda Parliament

Chamber of Deputies Umutwe w'Abadepite Chambre des Députés

Type
- Type: Lower House of the Parliament of Rwanda

History
- Founded: 2003

Leadership
- Speaker: Gertrude Kazarwa, Liberal Party since 14 August 2024

Structure
- Seats: 80
- Political groups: RPF Coalition (41): Rwandan Patriotic Front (37); Centrist Democratic Party (1); Ideal Democratic Party (1); Party for Progress and Concord (1); Rwandan Socialist Party (1); Opposition (13): Social Democratic Party (5); Social Party Imberakuri (2); Liberal Party (4); Democratic Green Party of Rwanda (2); Others (27): Indirectly elected members (27) (Note: 24 women by electoral colleges from each Province and the City of Kigali, two members elected by the National Youth Council, and one member elected by the Federation of the Associations of the Disabled.)

Elections
- Voting system: 53 seats are elected by Closed list proportional representation with 5% electoral threshold; 27 seats are elected by Indirect election
- Last election: 15 July 2024

Meeting place
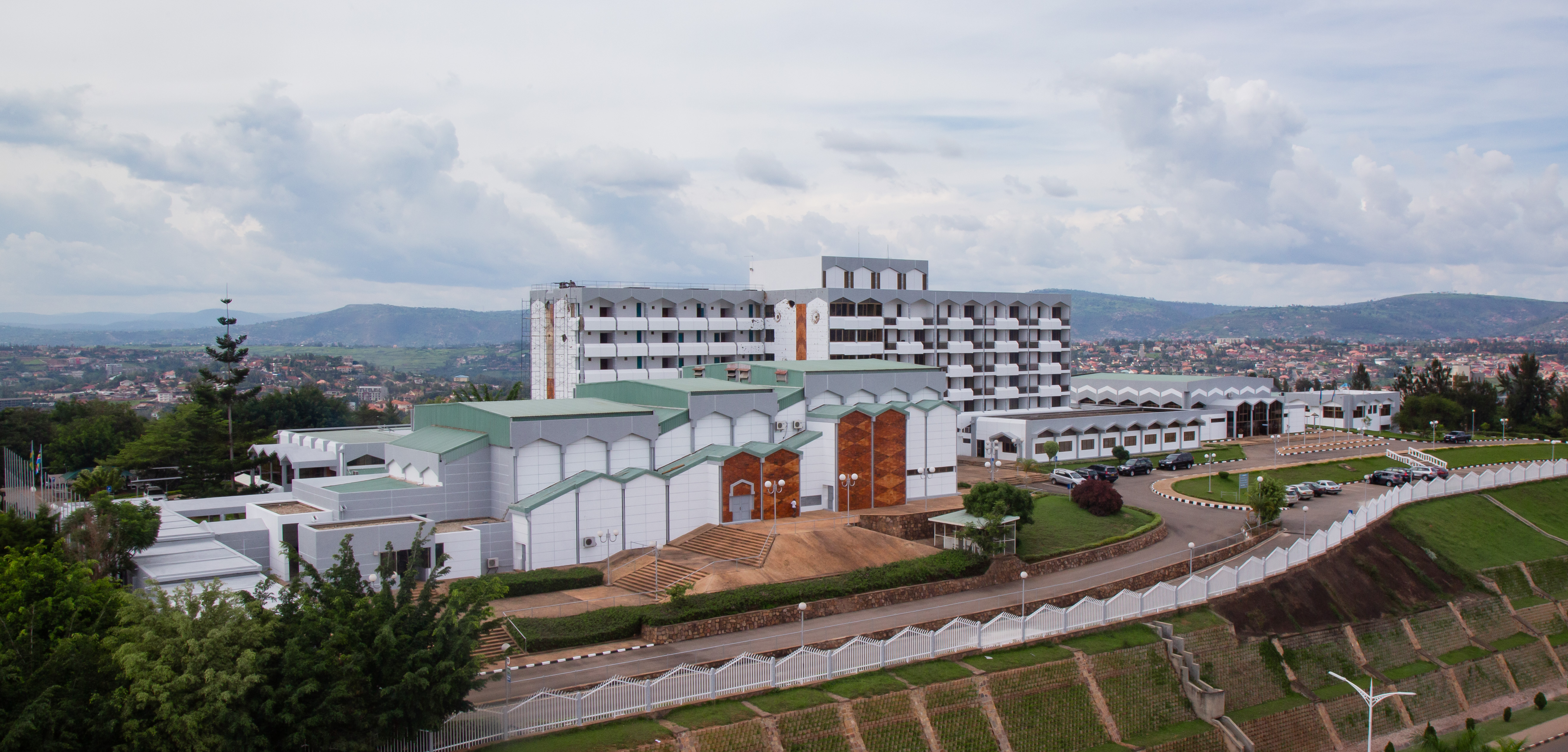
- Kigali

Website
- www.parliament.gov.rw

The Chamber of Deputies (Kinyarwanda: Umutwe w'Abadepite; French: Chambre des Députés) is the lower house of the bicameral national legislature of Rwanda. It was created under the new Constitution adopted by referendum in 2003.

== Composition ==
The Chamber is made up of 80 deputies. Of these, 53 are elected for five-years term by a closed party list and 24 seats are reserved for women who are elected by provincial councils; of the remainder, two are appointed by the National Youth Council, and one by the Federation of the Associations of the Disabled.

== Election results ==
Deputies elected to serve from 2018 to 2023 are as follows:

Name	Political party	Province
Médiatrice Ahishakiye	Women representative	Southern Province
Speciose Ayinkamiye	Women representative	Western Province
Christine Bakundufite	Women representative	Eastern Province
Eugène Barikana	Rwandan Patriotic Front	City of Kigali
Marcelline Basigayabo	Women representative	Northern Province
Theoneste Begumisa Safari	Rwandan Patriotic Front	City of Kigali
Diogene Bitunguramye	Rwandan Patriotic Front	Northern Province
Emmanuel Bugingo	Rwandan Patriotic Front	City of Kigali
Frank Habineza	Democratic Green Party	City of Kigali
Jean Pierre Celestin Habiyaremye	Rwandan Patriotic Front	Northern Province
Mussa Fazil Harerimana	Ideal Democratic Party	City of Kigali
Jean Pierre Hindura	Social Democratic Party	City of Kigali
Clarisse Imaniriho	Youth representative	Western Province
Marie Mediatrice Izabiliza	Rwandan Patriotic Front	City of Kigali
Ernest Kamanzi	Youth representative	Southern Province
Phoebe Kanyange	Women representative	City of Kigali
Emmanuel Karemera	Rwandan Patriotic Front	Western Province
Francis Karemera	Rwandan Patriotic Front	City of Kigali
Barthélemy Karinijabo	Rwandan Patriotic Front	Southern Province
Annoncée Manirarora	Rwandan Patriotic Front	Western Province
Chantal Mbakeshimama	Rwandan Patriotic Front	Southern Province
Gamariel Mbonimana	Liberal Party	Southern Province
Winifrida Mpembyemungu	Rwandan Patriotic Front	Northern Province
Valens Muhakwa	Social Democratic Party	Eastern Province
Christine Muhongayire	Rwandan Patriotic Front	Southern Province
Edda Mukabagwiza	Rwandan Patriotic Front	City of Kigali
Germaine Mukabalisa	Women representative	Southern Province
Donatille Mukabalisa	Liberal Party	Eastern Province
Jeanne Henriette Mukabikino	Women representative	Western Province
Christine Mukabunani	Social Party Imberakuri	Eastern Province
Alphonsine Mukamana	Women representative	Eastern Province
Elisabeth Mukamana	Party for Progress and Concord	Southern Province
Iphigenie Mukandera	Rwandan Patriotic Front	Eastern Province
Annonciata Mukarugwiza	Women representative	Eastern Province
Suzanne Mukayijore	Liberal Party	Northern Province
Justine Mukobwa	Rwandan Patriotic Front	City of Kigali
Omar Munyaneza	Rwandan Patriotic Front	Eastern Province
Théogène Munyangeyo	Liberal Party	City of Kigali
Jean Damascène Murara	Rwandan Patriotic Front	City of Kigali
Christine Murebayire	Rwandan Patriotic Front	Northern Province
Marie Therese Murekatete	Women representative	Northern Province
Cécile Murumunawabo	Rwandan Patriotic Front	City of Kigali
Eugene Mussolini	People with disability representative	City of Kigali
Anitha Mutesi	Rwandan Patriotic Front	City of Kigali
Alice Muzana	Women representative	City of Kigali
Leonard Ndagijimana	Centrist Democratic Party	City of Kigali
Madina Ndangiza	Women representative	City of Kigali
Emmanuel Ndoriobijya	Rwandan Patriotic Front	Northern Province
Marie Therese Nirere	Women representative	Northern Province
Winifrida Niyitegeka	Rwandan Patriotic Front	City of Kigali
Jean Rene Niyorurema	Social Party Imberakuri	City of Kigali
Pie Nizeyimana	Democratic Union of the Rwandan People	City of Kigali
Jean Claude Ntezimana	Democratic Green Party	City of Kigali
Damien Nyabyenda	Rwandan Patriotic Front	Southern Province
Angélique Nyirabazayire	Women representative	Western Province
Euthalie Nyirabega	Rwandan Patriotic Front	Southern Province
Athanasie Nyiragwaneza	Women representative	City of Kigali
Veneranda Nyirahirwa	Social Democratic Party	Eastern Province
Furaha Emma Rubagumya	Women representative	City of Kigali
Albert Ruhakana	Rwandan Patriotic Front	Southern Province
John Ruku-Rwabyoma	Rwandan Patriotic Front	Eastern Province
Georgette Rutayisire	Social Democratic Party	City of Kigali
Pierre Claver Rwaka	Rwandan Patriotic Front	Southern Province
Fidèle Rwigamba	Rwandan Patriotic Front	City of Kigali
Benoit Senani	Rwandan Patriotic Front	Western Province
Francesca Tengere Twikirize	Rwandan Patriotic Front	City of Kigali
Berthilde Uwamahoro	Women representative	Eastern Province
Odette Uwamariya	Rwandan Patriotic Front	Eastern Province
Veneranda Uwamariya	Women representative	Southern Province
Marie Pelagie Uwamariya Rutijanwa	Rwandan Patriotic Front	Western Province
Aimée Sandrine Uwambaje	Women representative	Western Province
Marie Florence Uwanyirigira	Rwandan Patriotic Front	Southern Province
Gloriose Uwanyirigira	Women representative	Southern Province
Marie Alice Uwera Kaymba	Women representative	Southern Province
Jeanne d'Arc Uwimanimpaye	Rwandan Patriotic Front	Eastern Province
Beline Uwineza	Women representative	Eastern Province
Solange Uwingabe	Women representative	Northern Province
Philbert Uwiringiyimana	Rwandan Patriotic Front	Western Province
Marie Claire Uwumuremyi	Women representative	Southern Province

== See also ==
- List of speakers of the Chamber of Deputies of Rwanda
- Senate of Rwanda, the upper house of the legislature
