= Beline Uwineza =

Rwandan politician

Beline Uwineza is a Rwandan politician, currently a member of the Chamber of Deputies in the Parliament of Rwanda.
