= Marie Claire Uwumuremyi =

Rwandan politician (born 1979)

- Born: 1979 (age 46–47)
- Occupation: Politician
- Organization: Member Chamber of Deputies

Marie Claire Uwumuremyi (born 1979) is a Rwandan politician. Since 2018, she has been a member of the Chamber of Deputies.

== Life ==
Before becoming an MP, Marie Claire Uwumuremyi worked for the Land Bureau, as a District Land Officer and District Land Valuation Officer. She was Chairperson of the National Women Council (CNF) in the Southern Province.

In September 2018, she became the MP for Nyanza District, Southern Province, as a women's representative. In October 2018 she attended a World Food Day event, supporting the Rwandan government's Girinka (One Cow Per Poor Family) programme. In December 2019, she was elected to the Executive Committee of the Rwanda Chapter of the Commonwealth Women Parliamentarians (CWP). In June 2019, speaking at a commemoration ceremony held in Mukingo Sector, Nyanza District, she reminded her audience of the importance of remembering the Rwanda genocide:

It requires that the youth be taught the history so there cannot be neither alteration nor telling it the wrong way for own interest. We instead must teach our children about the life we passed through, show them where we are, the visions we have set and what we expect them to take the country.
