= France and the Rwandan genocide =

France in the 1994 genocide against the Tutsi

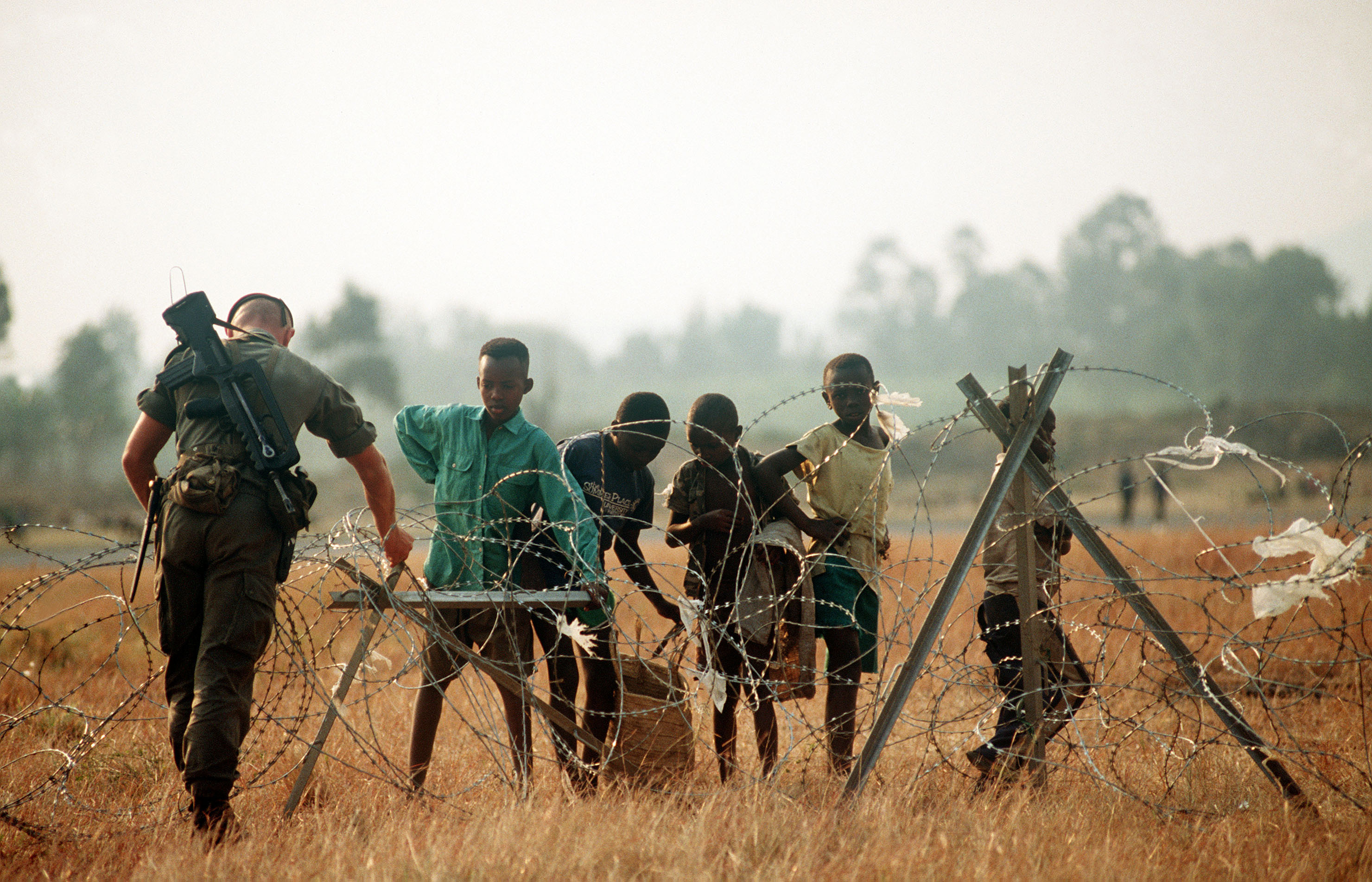
A French marine, part of the international force supporting the relief effort for Rwandan refugees, adjusts the concertina wire surrounding the airport.

The role of France in the 1994 genocide against the Tutsi has been the subject of sustained controversy and diplomatic tension between France and Rwanda. During the civil war that preceded the genocide, France supported the Hutu-led government of President Juvénal Habyarimana against the Rwandan Patriotic Front (RPF), a rebel group composed largely of Tutsi exiles that launched an invasion from Uganda in 1990. France provided arms and military training to the Interahamwe and Impuzamugambi, which were among the government's primary means of operationalizing the genocide following the assassination of Juvénal Habyarimana and Cyprien Ntaryamira on April 6, 1994.

Following the assassination of Presidents Juvénal Habyarimana of Rwanda and Cyprien Ntaryamira of Burundi on 6 April 1994, mass killings of Tutsi civilians and moderate Hutu began. In June 1994, near the end of the approximately 100-day genocide, France launched Opération Turquoise, a United Nations–mandated intervention that established a humanitarian zone in southwestern Rwanda. While French authorities described the mission as an effort to protect civilians, critics have argued that the zone also enabled some perpetrators of the genocide to flee into neighboring Zaire as the RPF advanced. The facts related to the French role in the 1994 genocide against the Tutsi have formed the focus of ongoing debate, and diplomatic relations between France and Rwanda have frequently been strained since 1994.

As a result of these developments and ongoing tensions between the two governments, relations between Rwanda and France deteriorated after 1994. Following a gradual rift with the Kagame-led government, the Rwanda government closed French schools and cultural institutions, although some were later reopened. It also changed the primary language of instruction in schools from French to English and applied to join the Commonwealth of Nations, at that time becoming one of only two members that were not former British colonies.

== Before the genocide ==
Prior to the genocide, France maintained close political and military ties with the government of President Juvénal Habyarimana. French officials viewed the Rwandan Patriotic Front (RPF), which invaded from Uganda in October 1990, as a destabilizing force in a Francophone ally state.

According to investigative journalist Linda Melvern, documents from the Paris archives of former president François Mitterrand indicate that French officials characterized the RPF invasion as aggression by an Anglophone power against a Francophone country. Melvern reports that the documents portrayed the RPF as part of an alleged “Anglophone plot” to expand English-speaking influence in the region.

Melvern goes on to state that most of Rwanda's arms deals were negotiated through the Rwandan embassy in Paris, even if these weapons were not used for the genocide. When the genocide was over, according to her, extensive records were found in the embassy offices, but none of them concerned Rwanda's relationship with France, as the documents had been systematically destroyed by Colonel Sebastien Ntahobari, Rwanda's military attaché in France. The book also relates other forms of military assistance the government of France gave the Rwandan government, similar to what France was doing in many other African countries and part of the "Françafrique" politics:

- A French military co-operation team was openly acknowledged to be in Rwanda, and was thought to have included forty seven people. These people were attached to key units in the army and in the gendarmerie as "advisers" or "technical assistants".
- A list of Rwandan officers prepared by Rwandan army officers within the Rwandan Ministry of Defense and dated March 5, 1994, shows three French nationals working as "technical assistants" in the reconnaissance battalion.
- In the Rwandan air corps, there were two French flying instructors, a navigator, an air traffic controller, and a mechanic.
- In the para-commandos, under Colonel Aloys Ntabakuze, there were four French nationals including a major in the French Army.

Melvern attributes other forms of French support for the regime. She reports that, according to Belgian intelligence in Rwanda, French diplomats advised opposition politicians that if they wanted to stop the RPF, they had to give their support to President Habyarimana.

A report by Human Rights Watch (HRW) early after the genocide also reported on French armaments support for the regime. It states:

Official deliveries of arms by the French government to other governments are regulated by well-defined rules, but in the case of Rwanda – as in many others – the rules were rarely followed. According to the National Assembly investigative commission, thirty-one of thirty-six deliveries of weapons to Rwanda during the years 1990 to 1994 were made "without following the rules."

HRW went on to provide that a former French policeman who had also served as security consultant to Habyarimana, Captain Paul Barril, was hired by the Rwandan Ministry of Defense to conduct a training program for 30 to 60 men, eventually to grow to 120, at Bigogwe military camp in the northwest. He was to provide training in marksmanship and infiltration tactics for an elite unit in preparation for attacks behind the RPF lines. Further, a Col. Didier Tauzin (who was later to re-enter Rwanda during the genocide under a fake name Col. Didier Tibault) was head of the French operation that had helped the Rwandan forces "spectacularly save the situation" in turning back the RPF offensive in February 1993. The French claim no evidence exists that these French officers were directly involved in the genocide.

The French report claimed that the HRW and Melvern analyses omitted countervailing facts known as of their writing – specifically, that there were no arms delivery by France or facilitated by France once it deemed large-scale killings likely, let alone during the mass genocide proper; and that one of the tasks that the Rwandan regime hired Barril for was to recover a pre-payment for a likely fraudulent arms delivery deal, that was stopped by the French authorities.

== During the genocide ==
During the first few days of the genocide, France launched Amaryllis, a military operation involving 190 paratroopers, assisted by the Belgian army and UNAMIR, to evacuate expatriates from Rwanda. The operation was later described by Gerard Prunier as a "disgrace," as the French and Belgians refused to allow any Tutsi to accompany them; those who boarded the evacuation trucks were forced off at Rwandan government checkpoints, where they were killed. The French also separated several expatriates and children from their Tutsi spouses, rescuing the foreigners but leaving the Rwandans to likely death. The French did, however, rescue several high-profile members of Habyarimana's government, as well as his wife, Agathe; in some instances, French troops used UNAMIR vehicles, without the permission of head of UNAMIR Roméo Dallaire. The French abandoned their embassy in Kigali, in the process shredding hundreds of documents containing details of their relationship with the old regime.

In late June 1994, France launched Opération Turquoise, a UN-mandated mission to create safe humanitarian areas for displaced persons, refugees, and civilians in danger; from bases in the Zairian cities of Goma and Bukavu, the French entered southwestern Rwanda and established the zone Turquoise, within the Cyangugu–Kibuye–Gikongoro triangle, an area occupying approximately a fifth of Rwanda. Radio France International estimates that Turquoise saved around 15,000 lives, but the timing of the invasion, with the genocide coming to an end and the RPF's ascendancy, led many Rwandans to interpret Turquoise primarily as a mission to protect Hutu from the RPF, including some who had participated in the genocide. The French remained hostile to the RPF, and their presence temporarily stalled the RPF's advance. According to HRW, Opération Turquoise had another purpose: Preventing a victory by the RPF. HRW reported that some military officers in Paris had talked openly of "breaking the back of the RPF." According to France's National Assembly, there were no documented large-scale killings in Zone Turquoise once it was established. By that same source, it seems the French intervention did provide some significant humanitarian relief in the areas it controlled. However, the French military presence effectively helped the perpetrators of genocide to escape from the RPF and flee into neighboring Zaire.

== Subsequent investigations ==
=== French Parliamentary Commission on Rwanda ===
The suspicions about United Nations and French policies in Rwanda between 1990 and 1994 and allegations that France supported the Hutus led to the creation of a French Parliamentary Commission on Rwanda, which published its report on December 15, 1998. In particular, François-Xavier Verschave, former president of the French NGO Survie, which accused the French army of protecting the Hutus during the genocide, was instrumental in establishing this Parliamentary commission.

The commission released its final report on December 15, 1998. It documented ambiguities and confusion in both the French and UN responses. Regarding Opération Turquoise, it regretted that the intervention took place too late, though it claimed that this was better than the lack of any response whatsoever from the United Nations. The report documented mixed success at disarming the Rwandan Army and militias, but a definite and systematic attempt (though not fast enough as far as then-General Paul Kagame of the opposing RPF forces was concerned, in documentation of the latter's communications with the French forces).

The Parliamentary Commission did not find any evidence of French participation in the genocide, of collaboration with the militias, or of willful disengagement from endangered populations, to the contrary. It documented multiple French operations, all at least partly successful, to disable genocide-inciting radio broadcasts, tasks which the UN and the United States had rejected calls for assistance with.

The report concluded that there had been errors of judgment pertaining to the Rwanda Armed Forces, but before the genocide only; further errors of judgment about the scale of the threat, at the onset of the genocide; over-reliance on the UNAMIR mission without awareness that it would be undercut by the United States and other parties; and ineffective diplomacy. Ultimately, it concluded that France had been the foreign power most involved in limiting the scale of the genocide once it got started, though it regretted that more had not been done.

=== Kagame-ordered report ===
Following an investigation of the plane crash of April 6, 1994 that killed both the Rwandan President Juvénal Habyarimana and Burundian President Cyprien Ntaryamira and precipitated the genocide, and in which three French crew had also died, the French judge Jean-Louis Bruguière indicted nine associates of Rwandan president Paul Kagame in November 2006. President Kagame himself was not indicted, as he had immunity under French law as a head of state. Kagame denied the allegations, decrying them as politically motivated, and broke diplomatic relationships with France. He then ordered the formation of a commission of his own Rwandan Justice Ministry's employees that was officially "charged with assembling proof of the involvement of France in the genocide".

In testimony before the commission, Jacques Bihozagara, who was presented as "former ambassador to France", claimed that "Operation Turquoise was aimed only at protecting genocide perpetrators, because the genocide continued even within the Turquoise zone." Beside misrepresenting the timeline of the mass killings in the Zone Turquoise, the implication of the testimony as conveyed to the foreign press was that Bihozagara had a sitting ambassador's insight into French policy at the time of the genocide. In fact, Bihozagara was a founding member of the RPF and close Kagame ally under whose watch as Minister of Rehabilitation the Kibeho Massacre occurred in 1995. His attitude and statements at that time led to reports that he had ordered that massacre, making him too much of a political liability for the RPF to keep as minister. Bihozagara was subsequently ambassador to Belgium, and then to France from September 2001 onwards; but in the intervening period Rwanda had closed its French embassy and purged personnel, precluding continuity of records.

The political character of that investigation was in turn further averred when the commission issued its report solely to Kagame – symbolically on November 17, 2007, exactly one year after Bruguière's announcement – and the head of the Rwandan commission, Jean de Dieu Mucyo, stated that the commission would now "wait for President Kagame to declare whether the inquiry was valid." In July 2008, Kagame threatened to indict French nationals over the genocide if European courts did not withdraw arrest warrants issued against Rwandan officials, which by then included broader indictments against 40 Rwandan army officers by Spanish judge Fernando Andreu.

Findings of the commission were released at Kagame's order on August 5, 2008. The report accused the French government of knowing of preparations for the genocide and helping to train the ethnic Hutu militia members; it accused 33 senior French military and political officials of involvement in the genocide, including then-President Mitterrand and his then general secretary Hubert Védrine, then-Prime Minister Edouard Balladur, then-Foreign Minister Alain Juppé, and his chief aide at the time, Dominique de Villepin.

A statement accompanying the release claimed that "French soldiers themselves directly were involved in assassinations of Tutsis and Hutus accused of hiding Tutsis ... French forces committed several rapes on Tutsi survivors", though the latter was not documented in the report. A BBC report commented that French Foreign Minister, Bernard Kouchner, denied French responsibility in connection with the genocide but said that political errors had been made. Another BBC report delved into the motivations for the Rwandan report and stated that:

Chief among them has been an iron determination to keep the world's attention focused on the genocide, rather than on the role of the Rwandan Patriotic Front (RPF), the force that took power in 1994, bringing President Paul Kagame to power. In recent years uncomfortable questions have been raised about the war crimes the RPF are alleged to have committed during and after 1994. While stressing there can be no equation between genocide and war crimes, Alison Des Forges of Human Rights Watch says RPF leaders do have a case to answer. "Their victims also deserve justice," she says.

=== President Macron's Commission ===
In April 2019 France's President, Emmanuel Macron, appointed a panel of experts to investigate France's actions, through the state archives, to determine the involvement of France in the genocide. This panel would consist of eight researchers and historians. Reportedly, the team will be given access to classified documents from the foreign and defense ministries, the external intelligence service DGSE, and the archives of then president François Mitterrand.

In March 2021 the commission finished their report, which found that while France bore responsibility for not breaking with the regime sooner, there was no evidence of French complicity in the genocide.

== Subsequent statements ==
On November 27, 2004 in a televised debate on France 3, after the showing of the French film "Tuez les Tous" (Kill Them All), created by three students of political science, the president of the parliamentary mission for information for Rwanda, former minister Paul Quilès stated that "France asks to be pardoned by the people of Rwanda, but not by their government".

In 2010, during a visit to Rwanda, French President Nicolas Sarkozy acknowledged that France made "mistakes" during the genocide, although, according to a BBC report, he "stopped short of offering a full apology".

In April 2016, 2017 conservative presidential candidate, Alain Juppé, who was also French foreign affairs minister during the 1994 genocide, tweeted that "implicating France in the Rwandan genocide is a disgrace and a historical distortion."

In May 2021, Emmanuel Macron apologized to the Rwandan people and said that France had not heeded warnings of impending carnage and had for too long "valued silence over examination of the truth". Macron also noted that France had not been an accomplice in the killings. Rwanda's president, Paul Kagame, praised Macron's statements saying that it was "an act of tremendous courage", "more valuable than an apology" and "the truth".

== See also ==
- France–Rwanda relations
