= Edda Mukabagwiza =

Rwandan diplomat, politician (born 1968)

Deputy Speaker of the Chamber of Deputies
- Incumbent
- Assumed office 2018

Member of the Chamber of Deputies
- Incumbent
- Assumed office 2013

High Commissioner of Rwanda to Canada and Cuba
- In office 2007–2013

Minister of Justice
- In office 2003–2006

Personal details
- Born: 1968 (age 57–58) Rwanda
- Party: Rwandan Patriotic Front (RPF-Inkotanyi)
- Education: University of the Witwatersrand
- Occupation: Politician, diplomat

Edda Mukabagwiza (born 1968) is a Rwandan politician and former diplomat. Since 2013, she has been a member of the Chamber of Deputies in the Parliament of Rwanda.

Mukabagwiza previously held the role of Minister of Justice in the Government of Rwanda (2003–2006), and was High Commissioner and Ambassador of the Republic of Rwanda to Canada and Cuba (2007–2013).

She was first elected to the Chamber of Deputies in 2013, and was re-elected in 2018. She is a member of the RPF-Inkotanyi party. In 2018, the Chamber of Deputies elected her Deputy Speaker in charge of Government Oversight and Legislation.
