= List of speakers of the Chamber of Deputies of Rwanda =

List of speakers of the Chamber of Deputies of Rwanda.

This is a list of speakers of the Chamber of Deputies of Rwanda:

Name	Took office	Left office	Notes
Alfred Mukezamfura	October 10, 2003	October 6, 2008	
Rose Mukantabana	October 6, 2008	October 3, 2013	
Donatille Mukabalisa	October 3, 2013	August 14, 2024	
Gertrude Kazarwa	August 14, 2024	Present	

== See also ==
List of presidents of the Transitional National Assembly of Rwanda - The preceding office 1994-2003
