= Suzanne Mukayijore =

Rwandan politician

Member of the Chamber of Deputies
- Incumbent
- Assumed office 2018

Personal details
- Party: Liberal

Suzanne Mukayijore is a Rwandan politician from the Liberal Party. She represents the Northern Province in the Chamber of Deputies.
