= Pie Nizeyimana =

Member of parliament of Rwanda in Chamber of Deputies
- Incumbent
- Assumed office September 2018

Personal details
- Born: 30 August 1983 (age 41); Kigali, Rwanda
- Political party: Democratic Union of the Rwandan People

Pie Nizeyimana (born 30 August 1983) is a Rwandan politician who currently serves as a member of parliament of Rwanda in the chamber of Deputies since 2018. He is the chairman of the Democratic Union of the Rwandan People (UDPR), a political party in Rwanda. The UDPR party formed in 1991 with the aim of uplifting Rwandan youth who lacked the chance of basic formal education, in 2022 the party estimated to have about 200 000 members.

== Education ==
Nizeyimana got his secondary school diploma in Mathematics-Physics combination from Rwanda in Groupe Scolaire Rilima in 2003, in university he did Bachelor of Science with Education from Kigali Institute of Education (KIE) in domain of Mathematics and Physics with Education, graduated in 2009. Later in 2015 Nizeyimana earned master's degree from Kampala University in Economics Policy and Planning.

== Early life and career ==
Nizeyimana born in Huye, Rwanda on August 30, 1983. In 2010, Nizeyimana served as a secondary school class teacher of Mathematics and Physics at Groupe Scolaire Kimironko I in Gasabo district. In January 2011, Nizeyimana moved to become the head of secondary school named Groupe Scolaire Rubirizi in Kicukiro district until February 2017, where he moved to lead another secondary school called Groupe Scolaire Muyange in Kicukiro district until 2018, and in September 2018 Nizeyimana became a member of the parliament of Rwanda in chamber of Deputies. Since he became the member of the parliament of Rwanda he has been a member of the Committee on Economy and Trade in chamber of Deputies.

Prior of being a member of the parliament of Rwanda, in 2015 Nizeyimana was elected as the chairman of Democratic Union of the Rwandan People (UDPR) after being secretary general of the party for 3 years, in December of same year he acted as a member of Rwanda constitution referendum observers. In 2017, he acted as the Rwanda presidential election observer of National Forum of Political Organizations Parties (NFPO). From September 2017 to March 2018, he served as spokesperson of Rwanda National Forum of Political Organizations Parties (NFPO).
