= Dancilla Nyirarugero =

Rwandan politician

Dancilla Nyirarugero (born 1970) is a Rwandan politician and career educator who currently serves as Governor of the Northern Province.

== Early life and education ==
Nyirarugero began her education at Ecole Primaire de Rungu, a school located in the Musanze District. She went on to study at Lycee Notre Dames de Citeaux, an all-girls' school in Kigali. For university, she attended the Institute of Applied Sciences Ruhengeri (INES).

She went on to receive her graduate education at Makerere University in Kampala, Uganda, where she graduated with a master’s degree in quantitative economics in 2009.

== Career ==
Prior to appointment as Governor, Nyirarugero was a lecturer at INES, and later became Dean of Business Studies at Muhabura Integrated Polytechnic College (MIPC) in the Musanze District. She was appointed Governor of the Northern Province on March 15, 2021.

As Governor, Nyirarugero has encouraged farmers to increase production of pyrethrum.

== Personal life ==
A devoted Anglican, Nyirarugero is the mother of four. In 2017, she went to Germany to complete further studies.
