= Jeanne d'Arc Gakuba =

Rwandan politician

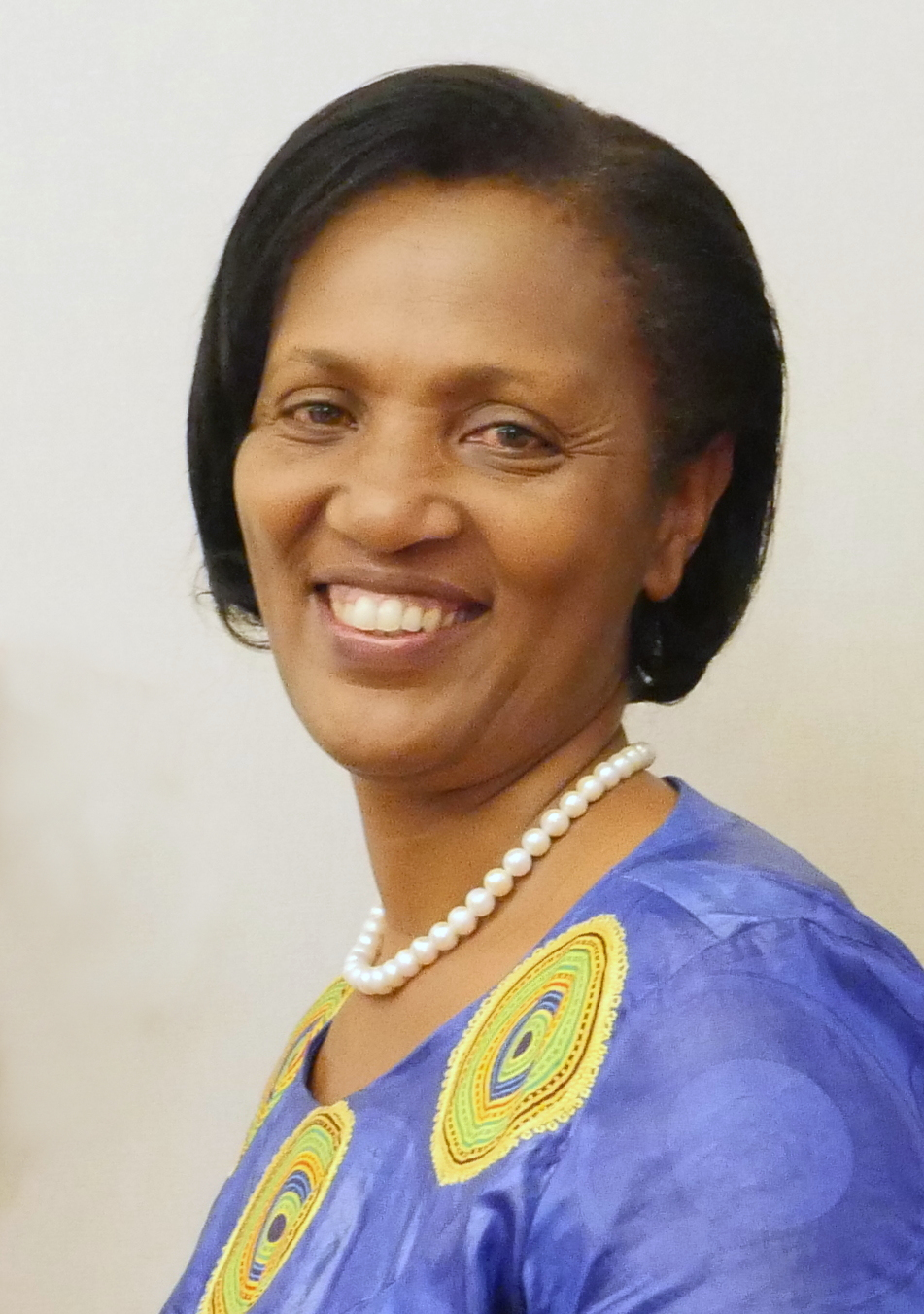
- Gakuba in 2017
- Children: 4

Jeanne d'Arc Gakuba is a Rwandan politician of the Rwandan Patriotic Front who served as the Vice-President for Finance and Administration during the Second legislature of the Rwandan Senate.

== Biography ==
Gakuba holds a Bachelor's degree in Geography and worked as a high school teacher.

She decided to run for office after shadowing a councilman of Tucson, Arizona while taking part in a young leaders program run by the US Department of State. She was elected vice mayor of Kigali in 2001 and served in this position for 10 years. She successfully ran for Kigali's senate seat in 2011, winning 80.78% of the vote. She left office in 2019.
