= Speciose Ayinkamiye =

Rwandan politician

Member of the Chamber of Deputies of Rwanda
- Incumbent
- Assumed office September 2018
- Constituency: Western Province

Personal details
- Born: Rubavu District, Rwanda
- Occupation: Politician
- Profession: Legal drafter; parliamentary official

Speciose Ayinkamiye is a Rwandan politician, currently a member of the Chamber of Deputies in the Parliament of Rwanda.

Ayinkamiye represents the Western Province and she is from Rubavu District.

== Biography ==
From 2000 to 2001, Ayinkamiye was a teacher in one of school in western province. From 2002 to 2018, she worked in various positions in the Parliament of Rwanda: Hansard editor (2002–2009), committee clerk (2009–2014), and legal draft (2014-2018).

In September 2018, Ayinkamiye was elected to the Chamber of Deputies in the Parliament of Rwanda.

Ayinkamiye is on the board of KCB Bank Rwanda Limited. Ayinkamiye is on the Executive Committee of the Commonwealth Women Parliamentarians.

== Education ==
She holds a master's degree.

== Career ==
- From September 2018 up to now: Member of Parliament, Chamber of Deputies
- From 20014- September 2018: Legal Draft at Parliament of Rwanda
- From 2009- 2014: Committee Clerk at Parliament of Rwanda
- From 2002- 2009: Hansard Editor at Parliament of Rwanda
- From 2000- 2001: Teacher at G.S APEHOT
