= Jacqueline Muhongayire =

Rwandan politician

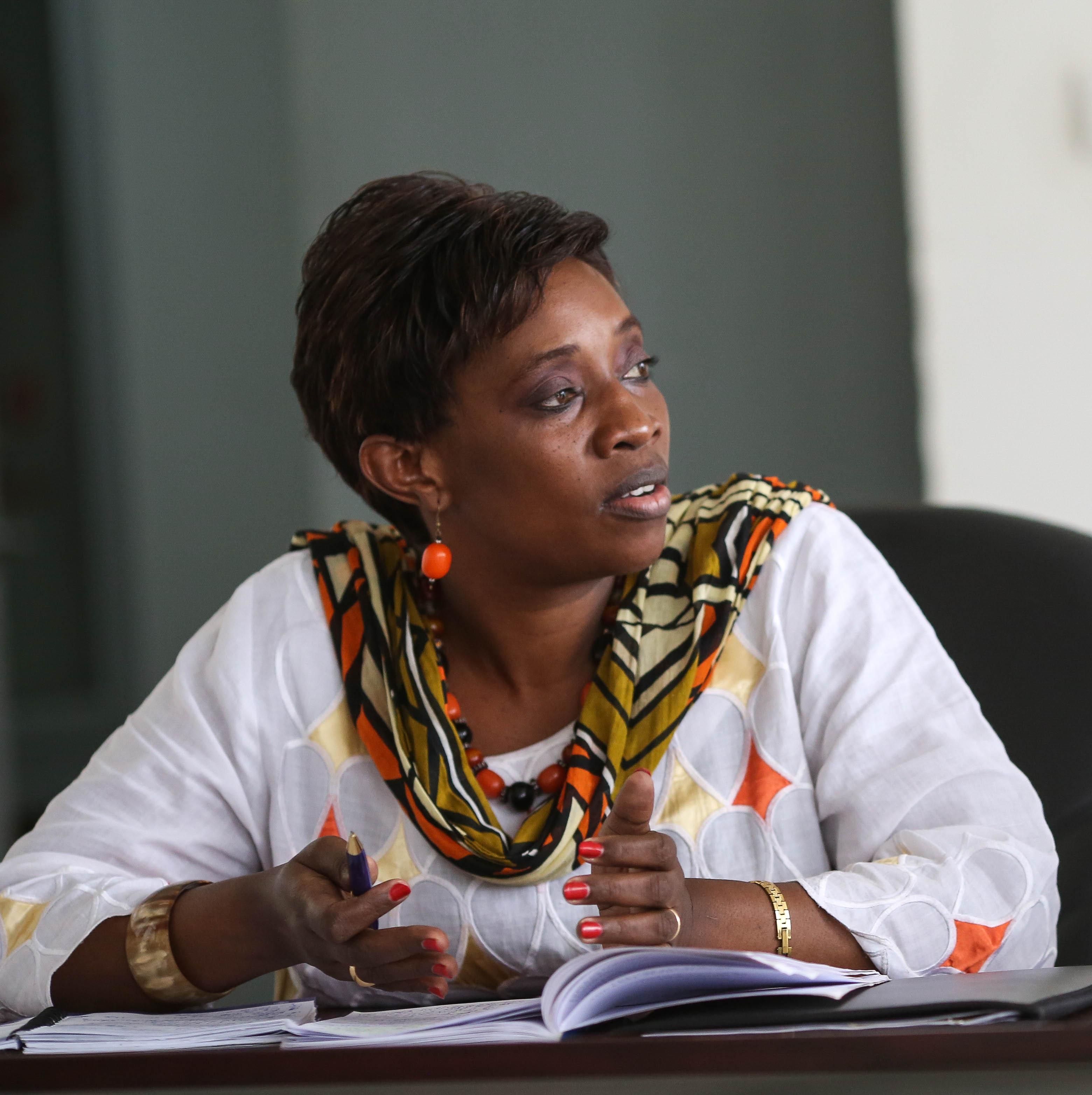
Jacqueline Muhongayire (2014)

Jacqueline Muhongayire (born 28 August 1961) is a Rwandan politician. She was a senator in Rwanda parliament beginning in July 2014 as a member of Social Democratic Party (PSD). Prior to that she worked as EAC Minister for a period of one year. She was in East Africa Legislative Assembly (EALA) for five years.

== Early life and education ==
Muhongayire was born on 28 August 1961. She is married with three children.

Muhongayire holds a bachelor's degree in accounting and a master's degree in project management. She studied politics and international relations at the Université libre de Bruxelles (ULB; 'Free University of Brussels'), Belgium.

== Political career ==
For 12 years (beginning in 1995), Muhongayire worked as a lawmaker representing the Social Democratic Party (PSD) in the Transitional National Assembly. From 1997 to 2000, she was its vice-president.

From 2008 to 2013, Muhongayire was a member of the East African Legislative Assembly (EALA). She next became a member of Rwandan President Paul Kagame’s Cabinet from July 2013 to July 2014, serving as Minister for East African Community. In July 2014, he named her to the Rwandan senate, replacing outgoing member Penelope Kantarama.
