= Bingen Technical University of Applied Sciences =

Coordinates: 49°57′12″N 7°55′25″E

- Technische Hochschule Bingen
- Type: Public
- Established: 1897 (as Rheinisches Technikum in Bingen)
- Chancellor: Benedikt Blanz
- President: Antje Krause
- Students: 2410
- Location: Bingen am Rhein, Rhineland-Palatinate, Germany
- Campus: Bingen am Rhein, Bingen-Büdesheim
- Website: http://www.th-bingen.de

The Bingen Technical University of Applied Sciences (German: Technische Hochschule Bingen) is a university located in Bingen am Rhein, Germany. It was founded in 1897. The University of Applied Sciences Bingen consists of two faculties: the faculty of life sciences and engineering and the faculty of technology, informatics and business.

== History ==
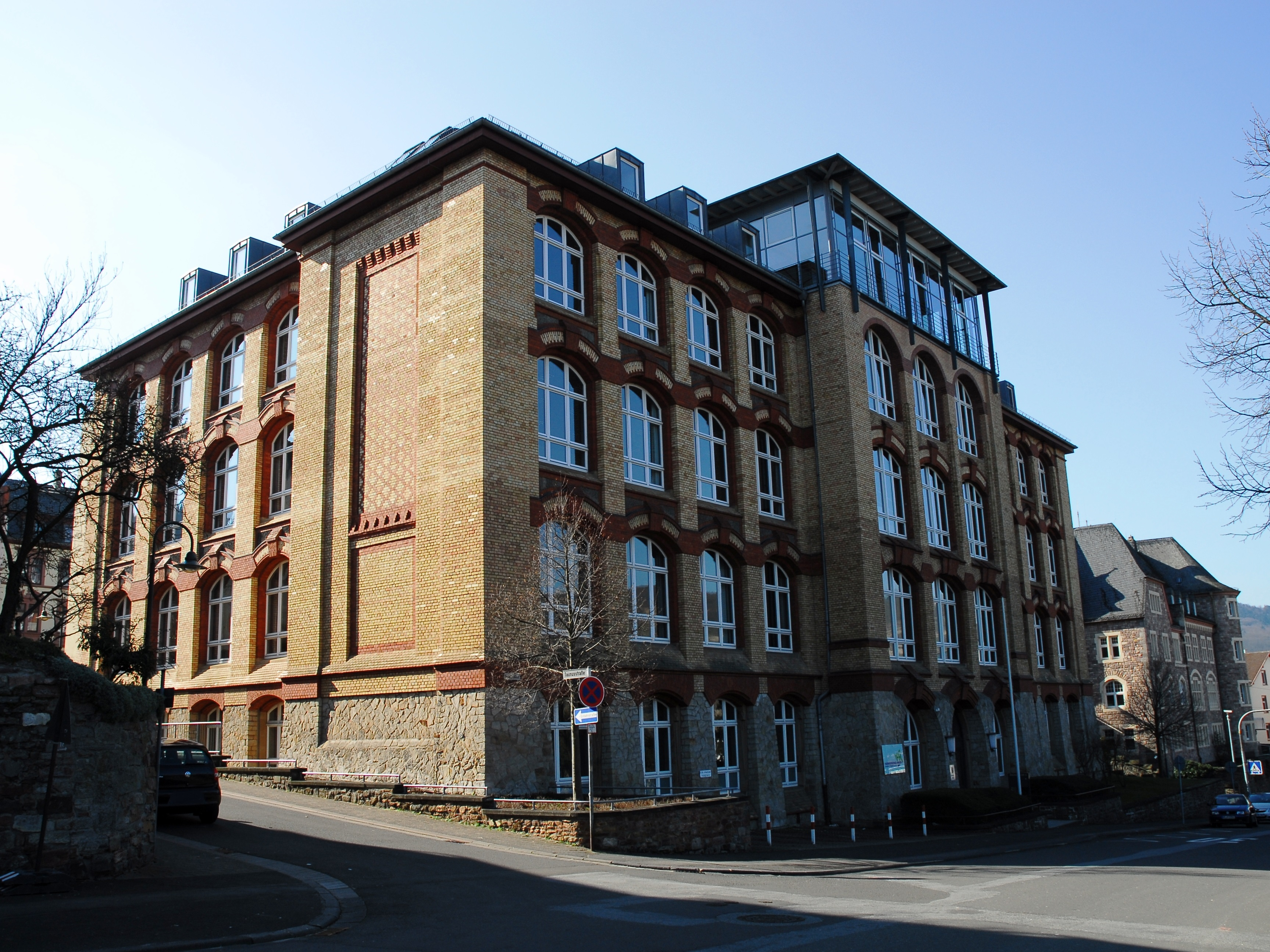
Original building of the Rheinisches Technikum, now the Hermann-Hoepke-Technikum.

The University of Applied Sciences Bingen was established in 1897 as the private Rheinisches Technikum in Bingen in Bingen am Rhein, with Hermann Hoepke as founding director and owner. In 1908, around 600 students were enrolled in mechanical and electrical engineering courses. During and immediately after World War I, teaching was moved to local schools, as the Technikum site was in use as a military hospital and then until 1920 as an administrative building. By 1923, student numbers have risen to 900, of which 600 were studying mechanical engineering and 300 were studying electrical engineering. After the death of founder Hoepke in 1928, the Technikum initially remained in the ownership of the Hoepke family, but faced financial difficulties due to a reduction in student numbers, which fell from 689 in 1928 to less than 200 in 1935. In 1939, the German Labour Front purchased the institution from the Hoepke family as well as the building itself from the municipality of Bingen as the previous landlord of the Technikum.

After damage incurred to the building during World War II, the college was reincorporated as Rheinische Ingenieurschule Bingen in 1946, lectures resumed in various locations around town. The Technikum site was rebuilt by 1954. In 1964, the school was renamed Staatliche Rheinische Ingenieurschule, and in 1971 it was incorporated as Abteilung Bingen into the newly founded Fachhochschule Rheinland-Pfalz, together with an agricultural college, the Ingenieurschule für Landbau in Bad Kreuznach. In 1987, a new site was inaugurated in the neighbouring town of Büdesheim, which had been incorporated into Bingen in 1929. In 1996, the Fachhochschule Rheinland-Pfalz was dissolved, and the college gained independence as the Fachhochschule Bingen. In 2016, the college took on its current name of Technische Hochschule Bingen, and in 2017 the original site of the Technikum was named Hermann-Hoepke-Technikum.

== See also ==
- Fachhochschule
- List of colleges and universities
- Bingen am Rhein

== Bibliography ==
- Wiegers, Hilke (2015). Vom Privatunternehmen zur Ingenieurschule der "Deutschen Arbeitsfront": das Binger Technikum 1928 - 1939. Binger Geschichtsblätter (in German). Bad Kreuznach: Verlag Matthias Ess. ISBN 978-3-945676-02-8.
- Zinn, Holger (2007). "Vom Rheinischen Technikum zur Fachhochschule". Studenten-Kurier (in German) (2). Essen: akadpress: 22–23.
- Technische Hochschule Bingen (2024-04-11). "Technische Hochschule (TH) Bingen: Geschichte". www.th-bingen.de (in German).
