= Rose Mukantabana =

- Born: 31 August 1961 (age 64); Nyanza District, Southern Province, Rwanda
- Occupations: lawyer, politician, women's rights activist
- Years active: 1980 - present
- Known for: First female head of the Chamber of Deputies, chair of African Parliamentary Union

Rose Mukantabana (born 31 August 1961) is a lawyer and women's rights activist. She is the former President of the Chamber of Deputies of Rwanda and was the first woman elected to the post. She was elected to serve as chair of the African Parliamentary Union from 2013-2015.

== Biography ==
Rose Mukantabana was born 31 August 1961 in Nyanza District, Southern Province, Rwanda. She graduated from high school and began working in the civil service in 1980, first in the Rwanda Society for Insurance and later in the Ministry of Public Services. In 1992, she entered the National University of Rwanda and graduated with a law degree in 1996. That year, she began working for Haguruka Association, an NGO which focuses on human rights and specifically rights of women and children. Spending nine years at the organization, she began as a Legal Assistant and worked up to Coordinator of Legal Affairs. After serving as National Executive Secretary, Mukantabana returned to school. Studying in Belgium, she earned a post-graduate "specialized diploma in human rights" from Université Saint-Louis Bruxelles.

In 2002, she was serving as vice president of Pro-Femmes, a pacifist umbrella organization which coordinated the efforts of 43 NGOs for women's development and rights. In 2005, she began working as the National Coordinator of the Women’s Legal Rights Initiative sponsored by USAID and in 2007, moved to ActionAid International Rwanda, first serving as Women's Rights Coordinator and later as the Program Development Manager. In 2008, she was elected as a Member of Parliament representing the Kigali City constituency. On 6 October 2008, she was elected by her fellow MPs to serve as President of the Chamber of Deputies of Rwanda until 2013 by a margin of 70 for and 10 against. Her election made her the first female to head the parliamentary body. In 2012, she was elected to serve as the chair of the African Parliamentary Union (APU) through 2015.
