= Rwanda Women Parliamentary Forum =

The Rwanda Women Parliamentary Forum (French: Forum des Femmes Rwandaises Parlementaires; FFRP) is a cross-party women's caucus aimed at uniting women in the Rwandan parliament towards common goals, and championing gender equality interests at the legislative level. Founded in 1996, the FFRP's specific objectives include building solidarity among female members of parliament (MPs) regardless of differing party ideologies, supporting women in parliament to get involved in the revision or repeal of laws that discriminate against women, and to raise awareness among other MPs, as well as public and private institutions, about the importance of gender equality. Their motto is "solidarity, women's empowerment and equality".

The FFRP is a part of Rwanda's national gender machinery. It advocates that all national laws and policies give consideration to gender issues, including the country's national budget. The FFRP also works to build the capacity of women Parliamentarians, in order to carry out advocacy around gender and development issues, and to successfully manage their other parliamentary duties.

== Background ==
The empowerment of Women and the creation of a discourse regarding parliamentary representation of Women in Rwanda has been an effect of the aftermath of the Rwandan genocide. Tumultuous gender relations in the Rwandan genocide, with an estimated 250,000 to 500,000 women, around 49% of the population, being subject to sexual assault, have influenced the formation of gender caucuses being formed in Rwanda. Gender targeted assault was utilized as a form of genocidal rape, often times ordered by leaders such as Pauline Nyiramasuhuko to create fear and oppression in the Tutsi female citizens of Rwanda.

Following the events of the genocide, the violence played a key role in shaping the collective consciousness of Rwanda. Activists such as Godeliève Mukasarasi encouraged the vocalization of assault victims in trials and the parliament, which promptly acted as a catalyst in the severity of punishment allocated for sexual assault in Rwanda and gender equality measure.

The formation of the caucus and female participation in the parliament was preceded by the presence of leaders such as Aloisea Inyumba, serving at the Ministry of Women and Family Protection. Following Inyumba, Angelina Mugazana pushed gender equality by allowing inheritance laws to be passed in 2002, allowing Women in Rwanda to be passed inheritance from parents and relatives. The platform was accentuated by the formation of the caucus and the allocation of seats in the parliament, following the rewriting of the Rwandan Constitution in 2003.

== Mission & Vision ==
The stated mission of the FFRP is "to contribute to the building of an egalitarian, equitable, inclusive and participatory society, playing the influential role in gender matters in accordance with the Parliament mission". The stated vision of the FFRP is "A society characterized by unity, equality and equity between men and women".

== Women in Rwanda's Parliament and Government ==
Rwanda has a bicameral parliament. It consists of two chambers, the Senate (Upper House) and the Chamber of Deputies (Lower House). Rwanda was the first country in the world with a female majority in parliament, currently at 61.3% for the Lower House and 38.5% for the Upper House. In 2018, the allocation further propagated having women hold 42% of the Cabinetry seats, 32% of Senate seats, 50% of Judicial seats, and 43.5% of distinct Council seats. Cuba is currently second to Rwanda for majority of female parliamentarians.

== Achievements ==
=== Legislative ===
==== The Law on Inheritance ====
Prior to the establishment of the Inheritance Law in Rwanda, traditional cultural practices did not allow women to inherit property, capital, or land from their relatives or ancestors. Rwandan marriages held the practice of transferring bridewealth cattle as a means of trading inheritance or dowry between families in alliance. Divorce was a difficult practice, as a woman was not allowed inheritance and ownership of wealth following the marriage.

The caucus in 1999, under the leadership of then Minister for Gender and Women Development, Angelina Mugazana, pushed the reform of the inheritance law to allow females the right to inherit from parents and spouses.

Although the Inheritance Law has been officially written to the Constitution of Rwanda, there has been controversy expressed by citizens that opine the effectiveness in implementation of the Inheritance Law has been unsuccessful. Rwandan women have expressed that men may bypass the prospect of legal marriage to mitigate the Inheritance Law.

==== The Law on the Prevention and Punishment of Gender-based Violence ====
The FFRP was responsible for drafting and introducing the Gender-Based Violence Bill (GBV), a private members bill and the only bill so far, at that point in time, to have originated outside of the executive branch of government. The process of drafting the original bill began in early 2005, when the FFRP mobilized its members and reached out to community leaders across the country to gather information and recommendations from the general population on how to define, prevent and appropriately punish acts of GBV. Following initial community outreach, a mass-media campaign began with the intention of raising awareness and sensitizing the country to the problem of GBV. Later on in the year, female parliamentarians of the FFRP returned to the field again to consult further with communities regarding the bill, and worked in collaboration with NAWOCO to conduct discussion sessions with women only, in addition to the discussions already taking place that involved both women and men. A consultative committee was established involving the Ministry of Gender, the Ministry of Justice, the national police, the legal community and civil society. The "Draft Law on Prevention, Protection and Punishment of Any Gender-Based Violence" was presented to Parliament on August 2, 2006, and after internal deliberation and revision, was passed into law in 2009.

The Law, also known in short-hand as the GBV law, defines different forms of gender-based violence and the applicable punishment for these crimes.

=== Community development ===
The FFRP has supported communities in Rwanda through various activities, including donating cows, distributing water tanks to households, planting kitchen gardens, and donating house materials, including schools materials to girls who have dropped out of school. For their 20th anniversary, the FFRP visited Gisagara District as it is one of the most vulnerable districts in Rwanda. Gisagara District is one of 8 districts that have now entered into partnerships with the FFRP since 2011, in terms of economic empowerment efforts for the district's most vulnerable women. The FFRP has also sought collaboration with Gisagara District authorities involving outreach programmes dedicated to helping the local community increase its innovative capacity.
