= Institute of Applied Sciences Ruhengeri =

University in Rwanda

Institute of Applied Sciences Ruhengeri - INES
- Other names: The Institut D’enseignement Superieur Unvirsity of applied Science De Ruhengeri
- Former names: Université Internationale au Rwanda
- Motto: Scientia et Lux' (Knowledge and light)
- Type: Private university, Research
- Established: 2003
- Vice-Chancellor: Dr. Fr. Baribeshya Jean Bosco
- Location: Ruhengeri, Musanze, Northern Province, Rwanda
- Website: ines.ac.rw

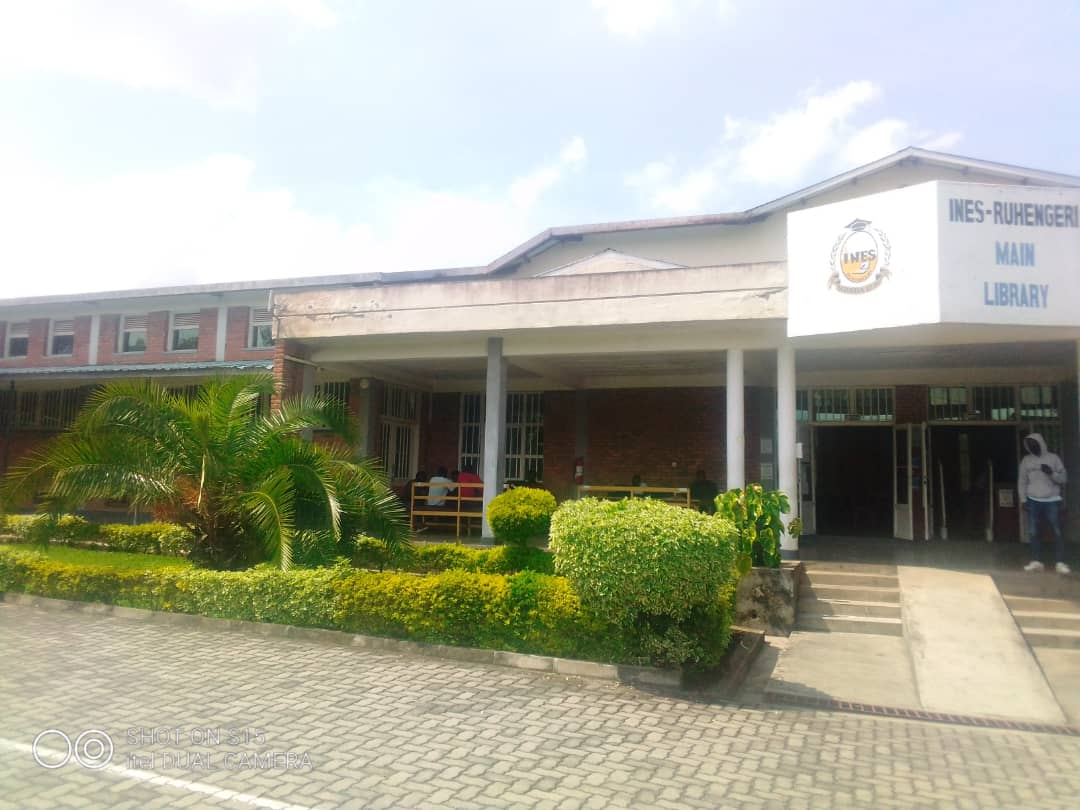
Main library on campus.

The Institute of Applied Sciences Ruhengeri (French: The Institut D’enseignement Superieur De Ruhengeri, INES), or simply INES - Ruhengeri, is a private research university located in the Northern province of Rwanda. It was established on November 17, 2003.

The acceptance rate is around 80-90%, making it one of the most accepting universities in Rwanda.

It is located in the city of Ruhengeri. In 2019, the university started a five year long collaboration with Bingen Technical University of Applied Sciences to research and improve farming practices in the area.

== History ==
It was founded in 2003 as Université Internationale au Rwanda, in a ceremony attended by President Paul Kagame.

It was given the power to award degrees in 2010.

In September 2019, it was reported that the university had started a research collaboration with Bingen Technical University of Applied Sciences in the German state of Rhineland-Palatinate. The collaboration is supposed to last 5 years, and has a goal "to improve farming practices through the use of technology".

== Faculties and departments ==
=== Faculty of Applied Fundamental Sciences ===
The Faculty of Applied Fundamental Sciences has the following departments:

1. Department of Civil Engineering
2. Department of Water Engineering
3. Department of Architecture
4. Department of Biotechnologies (Food&Plant options)
5. Department of Biomedical laboratory Sciences
6. Department of Land Survey
7. Department of Computer Science
8. Department of Land Administration & Management
9. Department of Statistics Applied to Economy

=== Faculty of Economics Social Sciences and Management ===
The Faculty of Economics Social Sciences and Management has the following departments:

- Department of Enterprises Management
- Department of Applied Economics

=== Faculty of Education ===
- Department of French & English education

=== Faculty of Law ===
- Department of Law (LLB)

== Master's programs ==
INES offers the following master's programs:

- Master's in Microfinance
- Master's in Entrepreneurship and SME's Management
- Master's in Taxation
- Master's in Cooperatives Management

== Notable former and current faculty administrators ==
- Dancilla Nyirarugero, current Governor of Northern Province of Rwanda
