= Pélagie Uwera =

Rwandan politician

- Born: 1974 (age 51–52)
- Citizenship: Rwanda
- Education: Kigali Independent University
- Occupation: Politician
- Years active: 2019–present
- Known for: Politics
- Title: Senator

Pélagie Uwera (born 1974) is a Rwandan politician, since 2019 she has been a member of the Senate of Rwanda, elected as a Senator for Southern Province.

== Career ==
Pélagie Uwera graduated with a bachelor's degree in social science and a master's degree in development studies from Kigali Independent University. From 1998 to 2009 she was a secondary school teacher.

From 2012 to 2019 Uwera was a Commissioner for the National Electoral Commission of Rwanda. One of seven Commission members, she acted as a Commonwealth expert observer at the 2014 Botswana general election. In 2018 she was again a Commonwealth expert observer at the 2018 Sierra Leonean general election.

In 2015 contested on a Social Democratic Party ticket as a candidate for the East African Legislative Assembly, but was defeated by Francois Xavier Kalinda.

Among 23 candidates for the Southern Province in the 2019 Senatorial election, Uwera was one of the three candidates elected for the Province. In October 2019 she was elected to serve on the senatorial Disciplinary Committee, as Chrysologue Karangwa's deputy. In November 2019, Uwera and senator John Bonds Bideri were elected unopposed to represent Rwanda at the Pan-African Parliament.
