= French Parliamentary Commission on Rwanda =

The French Parliamentary Commission on Rwanda was invested in the beginning of 1998, following a press-led campaign and articles by journalist Patrick de Saint-Exupéry in the Figaro newspaper, which called for an examination into the role of the French government in the events surrounding the 1994 genocide in Rwanda. The Belgian Senate undertook a similar initiative in 1997.

The French deputies decided to examine French policy in Rwanda between 1990 and 1994. For the first time in the history of the Fifth Republic, the Assembly examined events related to the "reserved domains" of the President of the Republic, in other words, functions of government historically seen as the exclusive realm of presidential authority. Composed of members of the Foreign Relations Parliamentary Committee and the National Defence and Armed Forces Parliamentary Committee, this mission was thus an expression of a renewed intent of parliamentarians to extend the democratic field of the Parliament.

The commission was presided over by Paul Quilès, and the hearings took place between March 24 and July 9, 1998. In connection with the inquiry, the committee members spent two days in Rwanda, visiting the Murambi memorial and meeting with Rwandan officials and private organizations. Entitled "Report of the Information Mission of the National Defense and Armed Forces Committee and the Foreign Affairs Committee on the military operations led by France, other countries and the United Nations in Rwanda between 1990 and 1994", the final report was published on December 15, 1998 .

== See also ==
- Rwandan genocide
