= Pélagie (musical) =

Canadian epic musical written by Allen Cole and Vincent de Tourdonnet

Pélagie is a Canadian epic musical written by Allen Cole and Vincent de Tourdonnet. It is based on the 1979 novel Pélagie-la-Charette (fr) by Acadian writer Antonine Maillet. It is about the Acadian widow Pélagie LeBlanc who in the late 1770s led her Acadian people back to Grand Pré from the American South, where they had been deported in 1755.

== Productions ==
The play was first produced in 2004 by CanStage in Toronto and the National Arts Centre in Ottawa and starred Susan Gilmour as Pélagie and Rejean Cournoyer as Joseph Beausoleil. A second production, in English and French, starring Marie Denise Pelletier and Rejean Cournoyer toured Canada's Maritime provinces, ended in Quebec in 2005.
