= Madina Ndangiza =

Rwandan politician

Madina Ndangiza is a Rwandan politician. She was the Deputy General secretary of the Ideal Democratic Party (P.D.I).

== Education ==
Madina is a graduate from the National University of Rwanda with a bachelor's degree in law.
