= University of Kigali =

Private university in Rwanda

- Motto: Labour for the Future
- Type: Private
- Established: 2013; 13 years ago
- Chairman: Mr. Philibert Afrika
- Chancellor: Dr. Carlos Fernando Sotz
- Vice Chancellor: Prof. Danson Musyoki
- Faculty: 334
- Administrative staff: 102
- Undergraduates: 6,107
- Postgraduates: 1,494
- Location: KN 5 Road, Boulevard de l'Umuganda, Kigali, Rwanda; 01°57′03″S 30°05′35″E
- Website: uok.ac.rw

University of Kigali (UoK) is a fully accredited and chartered university by the Government of Rwanda. UoK started its operations in October 2013.

== Location ==
University of Kigali's temporary campus is located along KN 5 Road, Boulevard de l'Umuganda, near the plush Kigali Heights in the central business district of Kigali, the capital and largest city in Rwanda. The geographical coordinates of the university campus are:01°57'03.0"S, 30°05'35.0"E (Latitude:-1.950833; Longitude:30.093056). The university operates a second campus in the Rwanda Social Security Bureau Building in the town of Ruhengeri, Musanze District, in the Northern Province of Rwanda.

== Overview ==
University of Kigali currently has two campuses; the main campus known as The Kigali Campus and the upcountry campus known as The Musanze Campus. Total enrollment is approximately 8,000 students, with approximately 6,500 undergraduates and about 1,500 postgraduate students.

The university has international students from Nigeria, Burundi, Uganda, Kenya, South Sudan, Tanzania, China, Ivory Coast, Gabon, Ethiopia, Turkey, Central African Republic, Malawi, Sierra Leone, Angola, Republic of the Congo, Senegal and the Democratic Republic of the Congo.

== Schools, faculties, and institutes ==
University of Kigali has the following academic units:

- School of Law
- School of Business Management and Economics
- School of Computing and Information Technology
- School of Education
- School of Graduate Studies
- School of Professional and Executive Programmes
- Center for Economic Governance and Leadership
- Center for Modern Languages

== Academic partnerships ==
University of Kigali has academic partnerships with:

- University of Cape Town
- Kenyatta University
- Cambridge Institute for Sustainability Leadership (Southern Africa office)
- Baden-Württemberg Cooperative State University
- Symbiosis International University
- Strathmore University

== Memberships and accreditation ==
University of Kigali is a member of:

- The Sustainable Development Solutions Network
- The Association of Commonwealth Universities
- Association of Chartered Certified Accountants
- AIESEC
