= Kigali Independent University =

University in Kigali, Rwanda

Kigali Independent University (ULK)
- Motto: Science and Conscience
- Motto in English: Science & Conscience
- Type: Private
- Established: 1996
- Founder: Prof. Dr Rwigamba Balinda
- Chancellor: Prof. Dr Kayishema Jean Marie Vianney
- Vice-president: Nyirashyirambere M. Louise
- Vice-Chancellor: Prof. Dr Nkundabatware Innocent
- Administrative staff: 418
- Location: Kigali, 2280, Rwanda
- Website: Homepage

Kigali Independent University (French: Université Libre de Kigali, ULK) is a Rwandan institution of higher learning founded on 15 March 1996. A private university, ULK is located in Kigali. The university was founded by Rwigamba Balinda, who remains its president as of 2023.

== Historical background ==
Kigali Independent University (ULK) was created in 1996, after the genocide in Rwanda which took place in 1994. Prof. Dr Rwigamba Balinda is the founder and owner of the University. ULK started its activities from the St Paul buildings.

After the St. Paul buildings, ULK built its first campus at Kacyiru currently these buildings hold the secondary school "Glory Secondary School". In 2007, All Administrative and teaching activities of ULK Kigali campus moved to the new headquarters at Gisozi sector.

In 2009, the university adopted the English language as its sole language of instruction.

=== Legal basis ===
ULK is governed by the Law No. 27/2013 of 24/5/2013 governing the organization and functioning of Higher Education in Rwanda, the Law No. 13/2009 regulating Labor in Rwanda, the Presidential Order No. 51/01 of 13/7/2010 establishing quality standards in higher learning institutions.

== Infrastructure ==
From January 2007 all the ULK Kigali campus faculties and administration operate in the new Campus premises at Gisozi.

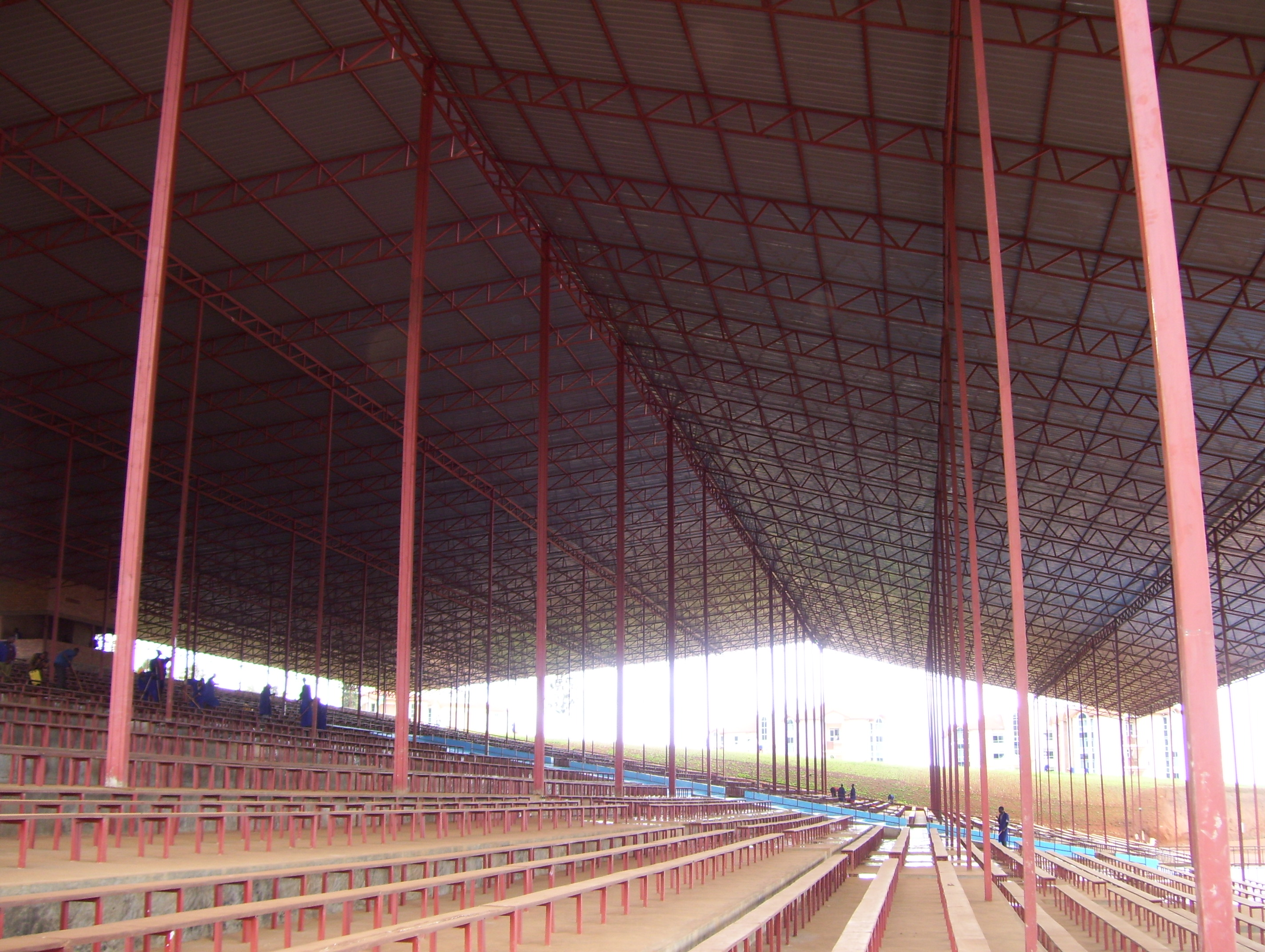
14,000 sitting places

A large stadium with almost 14,000 places holding capacity. For the academic year 2012-2013, ULK acquired 3,520 new books. Total books in the physical library counts 66,200 titles and a digital library with 500 new computers which has access to different publishers of e-books and e-journals, with a total of 1,170 computers for all the ULK computer laboratories, as well as six generators, including four of 200 KVA; 22 vehicles; etc.

=== Academic life ===
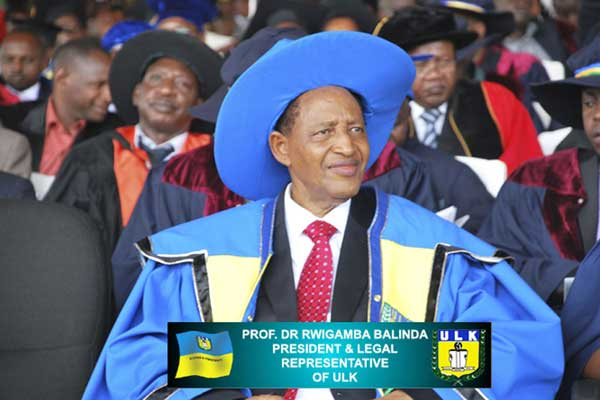
Dr Rwigamba the Founder and Owner of ULK

==== School of Economics and Business Studies ====
The creation of this School was due to a number of important factors; namely:

• The response to the request from the quasi-totality of prospective students;

• The presence of qualified professors in Economic Sciences and Management in the country;

• The need to rapidly provide the country with human resources mastering several sectors in the fields of economics and management.

Academic programmes general objective is to provide students with a training in managerial and economic sciences. These programmes are reinforced in a bid to provide a sound moral component as well as a professional one. Students are hence prepared and initiated to this through teachings which tend to favor adequacy between theories and the local, national and regional realities.

Theoretical courses, practical works and internships enable the student:

• To acquire and master concepts, fundamental principles and specific methods to Economic Sciences and Management;

• To conduct critical analysis of practical case studies and to research on operational solutions;

• To be able to effectively work into the public as well as private organizations.

The Departments in the school of EBS are:

Accounting

Finance

Economics

Rural Development (Gisenyi campus only)

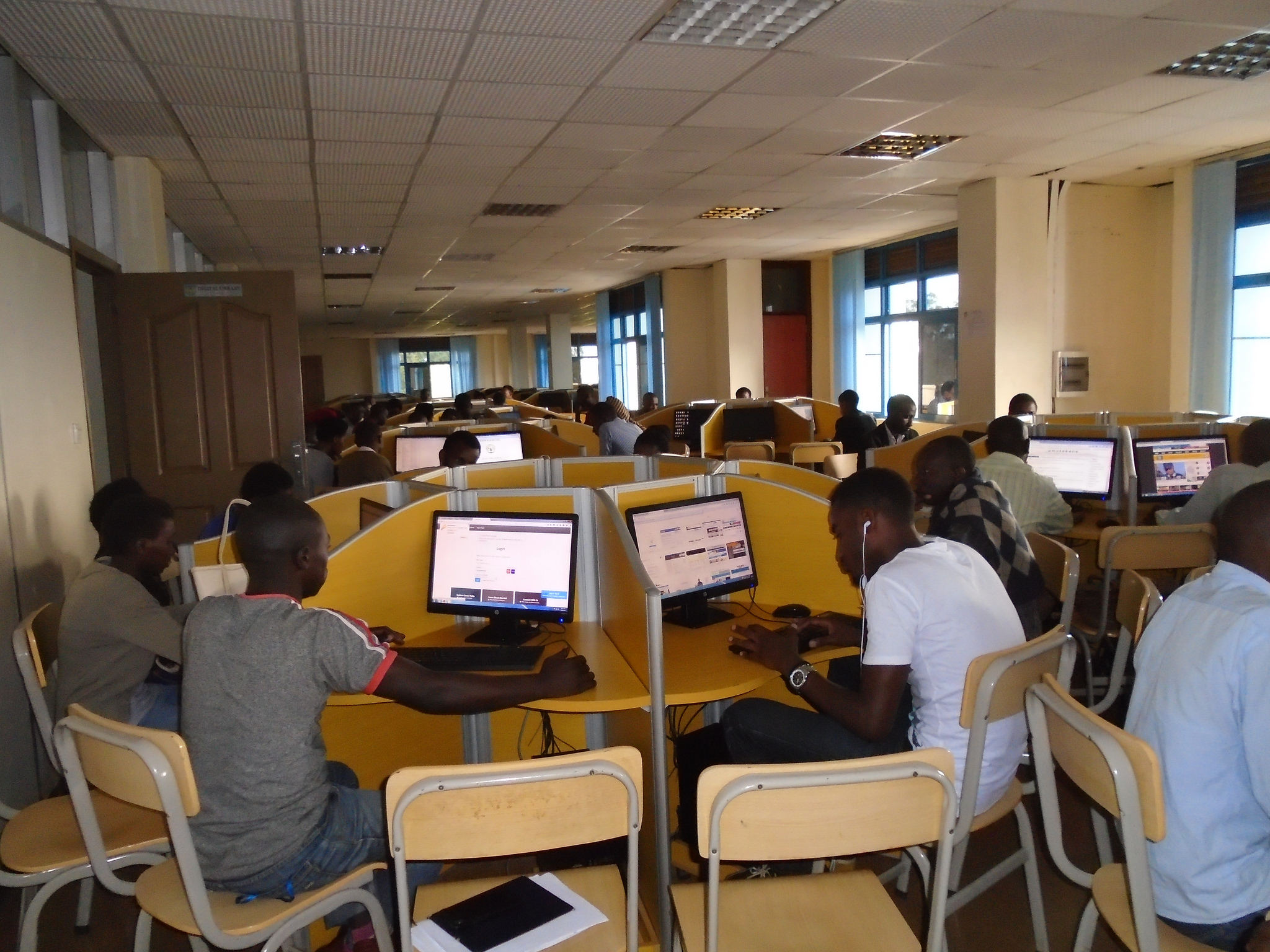
ULK Digital Library

==== School of Social Sciences ====
The creation of this School was due to a number of reasons; namely:

• The demand from a very elevated number of prospective students; • The existence of qualified lecturers in this School fields of science, in Rwanda; • The willingness to provide the country with executives well trained in social sciences fields

The School Academic Programmes aim at providing students with education and training respectively in Sociology, Population Studies (Demography) and Administrative Sciences.

These programmes target the local realities as far as possible. They include theoretical teachings, practical works as well as internships which provide students with both sound theory and practice related to their fields of interest: • To master the concepts, the fundamental principles and the methods specific to one of the three fields taught; namely: Sociology, Administrative Sciences and Demography; • To conduct critical analysis on various research problems and to research on operational solutions about them; • To be able to work in public as well as in private organizations;

Departments: Development Studies International Relations Sociology

==== School of Science and Technology ====
The School of Science and Technology (SST) is a school at ULK, which comprises several Engineering and Sciences Departments. Programs were selected based on what was thought to be a dire local need as well as being relevant to the demand of the Regional job market. The programs are designed to provide Hands-on skills training, and they focus on the technology of design, construction, implementation, and maintenance of the hardware and the software components of modern systems and computer-controlled equipment. The programs provide practical and theoretical principles to design and adequately maintain systems as well as using computerized equipment and instruments to solve technical problems in diverse application domains.

==== Majors in the department of Computer Science ====
Networking

Software engineering

Data Science

==== Exit Awards ====
Bachelor of Science with Honours in Computer Science: Software Engineering,

Bachelor of Science with Honours in Computer Science: Networking,

Bachelor of Science with Honours in Computer Science: Data Science.

==== School of Law ====
Department of Law

==== Masters Programmes ====
ULK has a variety of Masters programmes which include,

Master of Business in Administration

Master of Accounting

Master of Science in Economics

Master of Governance

Master of International Economics and Business Law

Master of Science in Internet Systems

Master of Public International Public Law

Master of Business Administration

Master of Development Studies

Currently ULK Kigali campus has 4 buildings:

- The School of Science and Technology.
- The School of Economics and Business Studies, The faculty of Law, and The Faculty of Social Sciences
- The Masters building

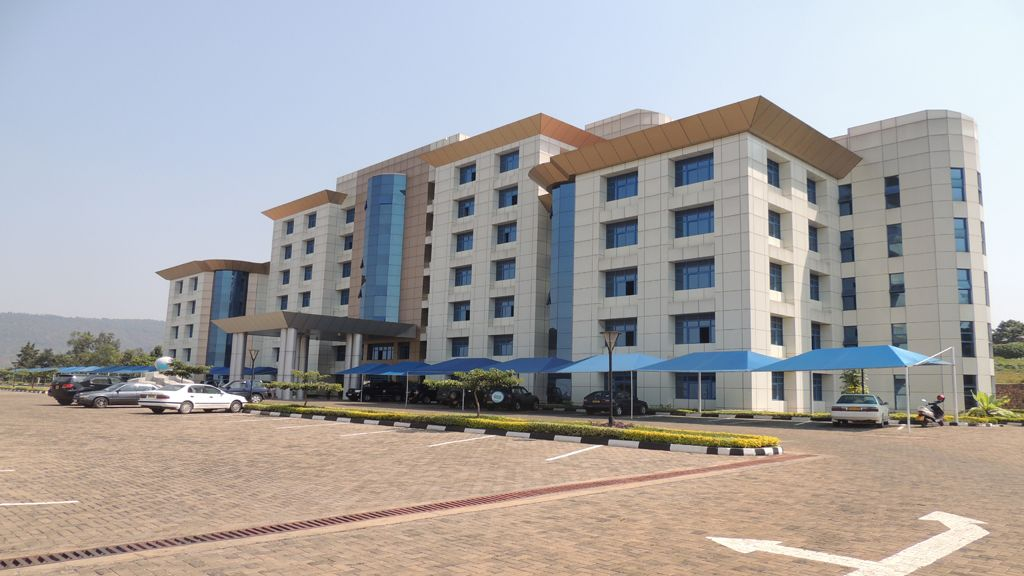
ULK Digital Library

Although ULK has only these four buildings in the Kigali Campus, it has a Master plan which will include many buildings, a hospital and a big stadium.

== Notable alumni ==
- Eugene Mussolini, member of the Chamber of Deputies
