= Parliament of Rwanda =

National legislature of Rwanda

Parliament of Rwanda Inteko Ishinga Amategeko y’u Rwanda

Type
- Type: Bicameral
- Houses: Chamber of Deputies; Senate

Leadership
- Speaker of the Senate: François-Xavier Kalinda
- Speaker of the Chamber of Deputies: Gertrude Kazarwa
- Seats: 106 members: 80 Deputies; 26 Senators

Elections
- Chamber of Deputies voting system: 53 seats are elected by Closed list proportional representation with 5% electoral threshold; 27 seats are elected by Indirect election
- Senate voting system: Appointed

Meeting place
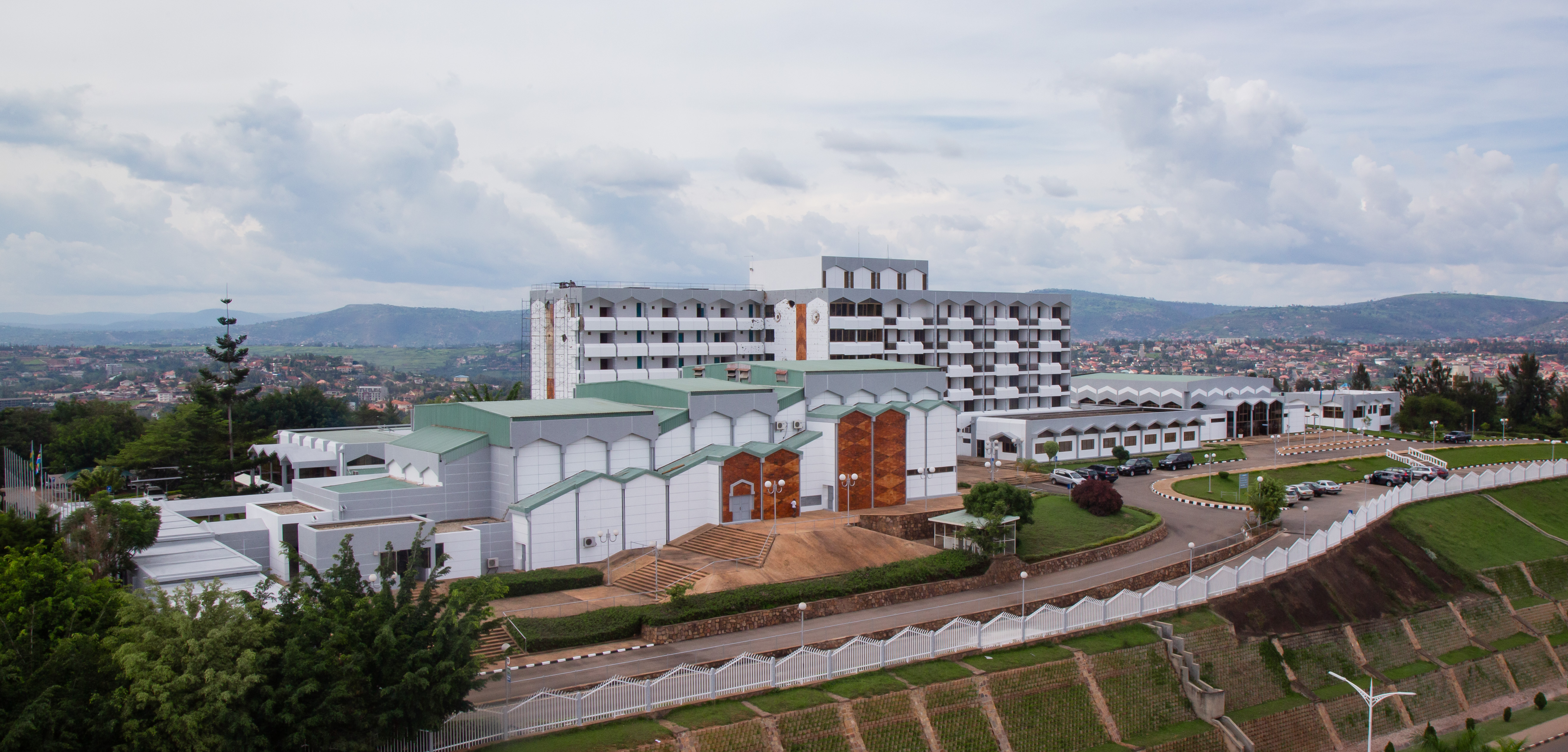
- Parliament Building, Kigali

Website
- www.rwandaparliament.gov.rw

The Parliament of Rwanda (French: Parlement du Rwanda; Kinyarwanda: Inteko Ishinga Amategeko y’u Rwanda) has consisted of two chambers since 2003:

- The Senate (French: Sénat; Kinyarwanda: Sena) (Upper Chamber)
- The Chamber of Deputies (French: Chambre des députés; Kinyarwanda: Umutwe w’Abadepite) (Lower Chamber)

== Legislative History ==
=== National Assembly 1961–1973 ===
Rwanda had a unicameral legislature, National Assembly of Rwanda, established in January 1961. It was dissolved following the coup d'état of 1973.

=== National Development Council, 1982–1994 ===
Rwanda had a unicameral legislature, National Development Council of Rwanda from 1982 to 1994.

=== Transitional National Assembly, 1994–2003 ===
Unicameral Transitional National Assembly of Rwanda was established in 1994 following Rwandan Civil War. It was replaced in 2003 by a bicameral legislature.

== Women in Parliament ==
Rwanda's parliament has the highest percentage of women in a single house parliament worldwide. The government has reserved 24 out of the 80 seats in the Chamber of Deputies for women. The 24 seats allocated to women are divided up between each province and the city of Kigali, where they are elected by an assembly made up of various councils and committees members.

More women were granted seats due to the effects of the Rwandan Genocide on the population. After the Genocide against the Tutsi, the population was made up of more women than men, and this was reflected in the makeup of Parliament.

== See also ==
- Politics of Rwanda
