= Human rights in Rwanda =

Human rights in Rwanda have been violated on a grand scale. The greatest violation is the Rwandan genocide of Tutsi in 1994. The post-genocide government is also responsible for grave violations of human rights.

== Before the genocide ==
As decolonization ideas spread across Africa, a Tutsi party and Hutu party were created. Both became militarized, and in 1959, Tutsi attempted to assassinate Grégoire Kayibanda, the leader of PARMEHUTU. This resulted in the wind of destruction known as the "Social Revolution" in Rwanda, violence which pitted Hutu against Tutsi, killing 20,000 to 100,000 Tutsi and forcing more into exile.

After the withdrawal of Belgium from Africa in 1962, Rwanda separated from Rwanda-Urundi by referendum, which also eliminated the Tutsi monarchy, the mwami. In 1963, the Hutu government killed 14,000 Tutsi, after Tutsi guerillas attacked Rwanda from Burundi. The government maintained mandatory ethnic identity cards, and capped Tutsi numbers in universities and the civil service.

== 1994 Genocide against the Tutsi ==
During the genocide against the Tutsi in 1994, about 800,000 Tutsi people were slaughtered.

== Post genocide human rights issues ==
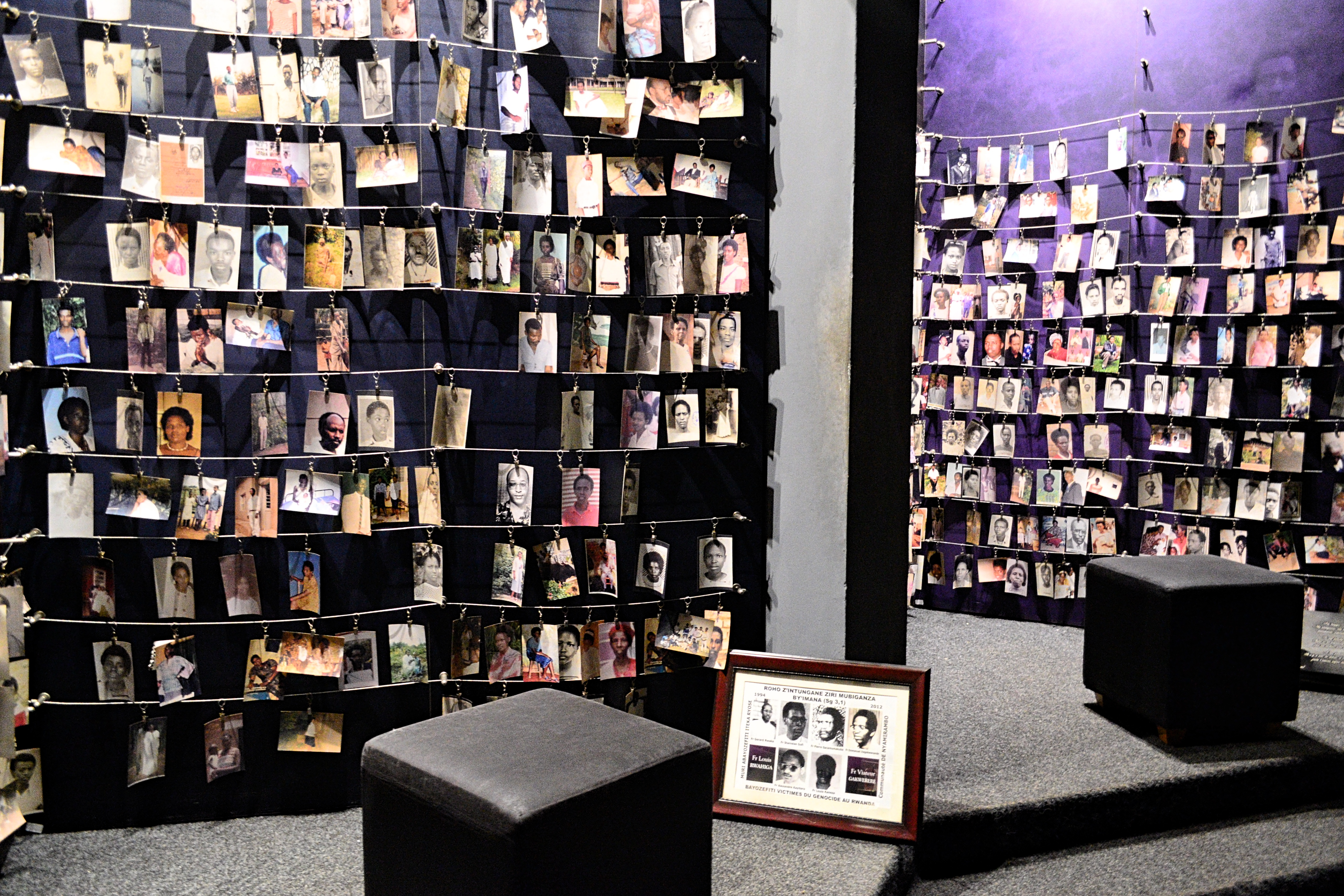
Photographs of genocide victims displayed at the Genocide Memorial Center in Kigali

Subsequent governments, including the current government led by President Paul Kagame, have committed grave violations of human rights.

On 22 April 1995 the Rwandan Patriotic Army killed more than 4,000 people in the Kibeho massacre.

In September 1996 Rwanda invaded Zaire, precipitating the First Congo War. The immediate targets of the invasion were the large Hutu refugee camps located right across the border in the vicinity of Goma and Bukavu, which were organized under the leadership of the former regime. The Rwandan army chased the refugees in hot pursuit clear across Zaire, while helping to install AFDL in power in Kinshasa. The historian Gérard Prunier estimated the death toll among the fleeing refugees to lay between 213,000–280,000.

In 2010, the United Nations issued a report investigating 617 alleged violent incidents occurring in the Democratic Republic of Congo between March 1993 and June 2003. It reported that the "apparent systematic and widespread attacks described in this report reveal a number of inculpatory elements that, if proven before a competent court, could be characterized as crimes of genocide" against Hutus. The report was categorically rejected by the Rwandan government.

In December 1996 the Rwandan government launched a forced villagization program which sought to concentrate the entire rural population in villages known as Imidugudu, which resulted in human rights violations of tens of thousands of Rwandans, according to Human Rights Watch.

According to a report by Amnesty International, between December 1997 and May 1998, thousands of Rwandans "disappeared" or were murdered by members of government security forces and of armed opposition groups. Most of the killings took place in Rwanda's northwestern provinces of Gisenyi and Ruhengeri where there was an armed insurgency. Amnesty wrote that "Thousands of unarmed civilians have been extrajudicially executed by RPA soldiers in the context of military search operations in the northwest."

When Kagame visited Washington in early 2001, Human Rights Watch criticized Rwanda for its involvement in the Second Congo War in which "as many as 1.7 million" civilians had died.

Regarding human rights under the government of President Paul Kagame, Human Rights Watch in 2007 accused Rwandan police of several instances of extrajudicial killings and deaths in custody. In June 2006, the International Federation of Human Rights and Human Rights Watch described what they called "serious violations of international humanitarian law committed by the Rwanda Patriotic Army".

According to The Economist in 2008, Kagame "allows less political space and press freedom at home than Robert Mugabe does in Zimbabwe", and "[a]nyone who poses the slightest political threat to the regime is dealt with ruthlessly".

Kagame has been accused of using memories of the genocide to muzzle his opposition. In 2009, Human Rights Watch claimed that under the pretense of maintaining ethnic harmony, Kagame's government displays "a marked intolerance of the most basic forms of dissent." It also claimed that laws enacted in 2009 that ban "genocide ideology" are frequently used to legally gag the opposition. In 2010, along similar lines, The Economist claimed that Kagame frequently accuses his opponents of "divisionism," or fomenting racial hatred. In 2011, Freedom House noted that the government justifies restrictions on civil liberties as a necessary measure to prevent ethnic violence. These restrictions are so severe that even mundane discussions of ethnicity can result in being arrested for divisionism.

The United States government in 2006 described the human rights record of the Kagame government as "mediocre", citing the "disappearances" of political dissidents, as well as arbitrary arrests and acts of violence, torture, and murders committed by police. U. S. authorities listed human rights problems including the existence of political prisoners and limited freedom of the press, freedom of assembly and freedom of religion.

Reporters Without Borders listed Rwanda in 147th place out of 169 for freedom of the press in 2007, and reported that "Rwandan journalists suffer permanent hostility from their government and surveillance by the security services". It cited cases of journalists being threatened, harassed, and arrested for criticising the government. According to Reporters Without Borders, "President Paul Kagame and his government have never accepted that the press should be guaranteed genuine freedom".

In 2010, Rwanda fell to 169th place, out of 178, entering the ranks of the ten lowest-ranked countries in the world for press freedom. Reporters Without Borders stated that "Rwanda, Yemen and Syria have joined Burma and North Korea as the most repressive countries in the world against journalists", adding that in Rwanda, "the third lowest-ranked African country", "this drop was caused by the suspending of the main independent press media, the climate of terror surrounding the presidential election, and the murdering, in Kigali, of the deputy editor of Umuvugizi, Jean-Léonard Rugambage. In proportions almost similar to those of Somalia, Rwanda is emptying itself of its journalists, who are fleeing the country due to their fear of repression".

In December 2008, a draft report commissioned by the United Nations, to be presented to the Sanctions Committee of the United Nations Security Council, alleged that Kagame's Rwanda was supplying child soldiers to Tutsi rebels in Nord-Kivu, Democratic Republic of the Congo, in the context of the conflict in Nord-Kivu in 2008. The report also alleged that Rwanda was supplying General Laurent Nkunda with "military equipment, the use of Rwandan banks, and allow[ing] the rebels to launch attacks from Rwandan territory on the Congolese army".

In July 2009, the Commonwealth Human Rights Initiative issued a report critical of the human rights situation in Rwanda. It highlighted "a lack of political freedom and harassment of journalists". It urged the Rwandan government to enact legislation enabling freedom of information and to "authorise the presence of an opposition in the next election". It also emphasised abuses carried out by Rwandan troops in the Democratic Republic of the Congo, and described Rwanda's overall human rights situation as "very poor":

The report details a country in which democracy, freedom of speech, the press and human rights are undermined or violently abused, in which courts fail to meet international standards, and a country which has invaded its neighbour, the Democratic Republic of Congo, four times since 1994. ... Censorship is prevalent, according to the report, and the government has a record of shutting down independent media and harassing journalists. It concludes that Rwanda's constitution is used as a "façade" to hide "the repressive nature of the regime" and backs claims that Rwanda is essentially "an army with a state".

=== 2010s and later ===
In the lead-up to the 2010 presidential election, the United Nations "demanded a full investigation into allegations of politically motivated killings of opposition figures". André Kagwa Rwisereka, the president of the Democratic Green Party of Rwanda, was found beheaded. "[A] lawyer who had participated in genocide trials at a UN tribunal was shot dead". There was a murder attempt on Kayumba Nyamwasa, "a former senior Rwandan general who had fallen out with Kagame". And Jean-Léonard Rugambage, a journalist investigating that attempted murder, was himself murdered.

In 2011, Amnesty International criticized the continued detention of former transportation minister and Bizimungu ally Charles Ntakirutinka, who was seven years into a ten-year sentence at Kigali central prison. Amnesty International called him a prisoner of conscience and named him a 2011 "priority case".

In October 2012, the body of Théogène Turatsinze, a Rwandan businessman living in Mozambique, who was thought to have "had access to politically sensitive financial information related to certain Rwandan government insiders", was found tied up and floating in the sea. Police in Mozambique "initially indicated Rwandan government involvement in the killing before contacting the government and changing its characterization to a common crime. Rwandan government officials publicly condemned the killing and denied involvement." Foreign media connected the murder to those of several prominent critics of the Rwandan government over the previous two years.

To improve the perception of its human rights record, the Rwandan government in 2009 engaged a U. S. public relations firm, Racepoint Group, who had improved the image of Libya's Gaddafi, Tunisia, Angola, Equatorial Guinea, Ethiopia, and Senegal. An internet site was set up by BTP advisers, a British firm, to attack critics. Racepoint's agreement with the government stated that it would "flood" the Internet and the media with positive stories about Rwanda.

In 2020, regime critic Paul Rusesabagina who had fled the country and become a Belgian citizen, was tricked into boarding a private flight to Rwanda, arrested, and the next year sentenced to 25 years in prison on charges that human rights advocates called politically motivated.

== Critics of the Rwandan government dead or missing ==
- 1995: Journalist Manasse Mugabo disappears in Kigali; not seen again.
- 1996: RPF colonel and former MP Théoneste Lizinde and businessman Augustin Bugirimfura shot dead in Nairobi.
- 1998: Journalist Emmanuel Munyemanzi disappears from Kigali; body spotted in city but not returned to family.
- 1998: First post-genocide Interior Minister Seth Sendashonga shot dead in Nairobi. A previous attempt at his life had been made in 1996.
- 2000: First post-genocide President Pasteur Bizimungu's adviser, Asiel Kabera, shot dead in Kigali.
- 2003: EX-RPF officer and top judge Augustin Cyiza and magistrate Eliezar Runyaruka disappear from Kigali; not seen again.
- 2003: Opposition MP Leonard Hitimana disappears from Kigali; not seen again.
- 2010: Ex-RPF officer Faustin Kayumbas Nyamwasa shot and wounded in Johannesburg.
- 2010: Journalist Jean-Leonard Rugambage gunned down in Kigali.
- 2010: Reporter Dominique Makeli survives abduction in Kampala.
- 2010: André Kagwa Rwisereka, deputy leader of the Democratic Green Party, found beheaded.
- 2011: Charles Ingabire, a journalist and "outspoken critic of the Rwandan government", gunned down in Kampala.
- 2014: Patrick Karegeya, former head of the foreign Intelligence services and supporter of the opposition, found strangled in a hotel in Johannesburg.
- 2020: Kizito Mihigo, songwriter who fell into disfavour of the regime after a song released in 2014, died in a police cell days after being arrested.

== Historical situation ==
The following chart shows Rwanda's ratings since 1972 in the Freedom in the World reports, published annually by Freedom House. A rating of 1 is "free"; 7, "not free".^{1}

Historical ratings

Year	Political Rights	Civil Liberties	Status	President^{2}
1972	7	6	Not Free	Grégoire Kayibanda
1973	7	6	Not Free	Grégoire Kayibanda
1974	7	5	Not Free	Juvénal Habyarimana
1975	7	5	Not Free	Juvénal Habyarimana
1976	7	5	Not Free	Juvénal Habyarimana
1977	7	5	Not Free	Juvénal Habyarimana
1978	6	6	Not Free	Juvénal Habyarimana
1979	6	6	Not Free	Juvénal Habyarimana
1980	6	6	Not Free	Juvénal Habyarimana
1981	6	6	Not Free	Juvénal Habyarimana
1982^{3}	6	6	Not Free	Juvénal Habyarimana
1983	6	6	Not Free	Juvénal Habyarimana
1984	6	6	Not Free	Juvénal Habyarimana
1985	6	6	Not Free	Juvénal Habyarimana
1986	6	6	Not Free	Juvénal Habyarimana
1987	6	6	Not Free	Juvénal Habyarimana
1988	6	6	Not Free	Juvénal Habyarimana
1989	6	6	Not Free	Juvénal Habyarimana
1990	6	6	Not Free	Juvénal Habyarimana
1991	6	6	Not Free	Juvénal Habyarimana
1992	6	5	Not Free	Juvénal Habyarimana
1993	6	5	Not Free	Juvénal Habyarimana
1994	7	7	Not Free	Juvénal Habyarimana
1995	7	6	Not Free	Pasteur Bizimungu
1996	7	6	Not Free	Pasteur Bizimungu
1997	7	6	Not Free	Pasteur Bizimungu
1998	7	6	Not Free	Pasteur Bizimungu
1999	7	6	Not Free	Pasteur Bizimungu
2000	7	6	Not Free	Pasteur Bizimungu
2001	7	6	Not Free	Paul Kagame
2002	7	5	Not Free	Paul Kagame
2003	6	5	Not Free	Paul Kagame
2004	6	5	Not Free	Paul Kagame
2005	6	5	Not Free	Paul Kagame
2006	6	5	Not Free	Paul Kagame
2007	6	5	Not Free	Paul Kagame
2008	6	5	Not Free	Paul Kagame
2009	6	5	Not Free	Paul Kagame
2010	6	5	Not Free	Paul Kagame
2011	6	5	Not Free	Paul Kagame
2012	6	6	Not Free	Paul Kagame
2013	6	5	Not Free	Paul Kagame
2014	6	6	Not Free	Paul Kagame
2015	6	6	Not Free	Paul Kagame
2016	6	6	Not Free	Paul Kagame
2017	6	6	Not Free	Paul Kagame
2018	6	6	Not Free	Paul Kagame
2019	6	6	Not Free	Paul Kagame
2020	6	6	Not Free	Paul Kagame
2021	6	6	Not Free	Paul Kagame
2022	6	6	Not Free	Paul Kagame
2023	6	6	Not Free	Paul Kagame

== International treaties ==
Rwanda's stances on international human rights treaties are as follows:

International treaties

Treaty	Organization	Introduced	Signed	Ratified
Convention on the Prevention and Punishment of the Crime of Genocide	United Nations	1948	-	1975
International Convention on the Elimination of All Forms of Racial Discrimination	United Nations	1966	-	1975
International Covenant on Economic, Social and Cultural Rights	United Nations	1966	-	1975
International Covenant on Civil and Political Rights	United Nations	1966	-	1975
First Optional Protocol to the International Covenant on Civil and Political Rights	United Nations	1966	-	-
Convention on the Non-Applicability of Statutory Limitations to War Crimes and Crimes Against Humanity	United Nations	1968	-	1975
International Convention on the Suppression and Punishment of the Crime of Apartheid	United Nations	1973	1974	1981
Convention on the Elimination of All Forms of Discrimination against Women	United Nations	1979	1980	1981
Convention against Torture and Other Cruel, Inhuman or Degrading Treatment or Punishment	United Nations	1984	-	2008
Convention on the Rights of the Child	United Nations	1989	1990	1991
Second Optional Protocol to the International Covenant on Civil and Political Rights, aiming at the abolition of the death penalty	United Nations	1989	-	2008
International Convention on the Protection of the Rights of All Migrant Workers and Members of Their Families	United Nations	1990	-	2008
Optional Protocol to the Convention on the Elimination of All Forms of Discrimination against Women	United Nations	1999	-	2008
Optional Protocol to the Convention on the Rights of the Child on the Involvement of Children in Armed Conflict	United Nations	2000	-	2002
Optional Protocol to the Convention on the Rights of the Child on the Sale of Children, Child Prostitution and Child Pornography	United Nations	2000	-	2002
Convention on the Rights of Persons with Disabilities	United Nations	2006	-	2008
Optional Protocol to the Convention on the Rights of Persons with Disabilities	United Nations	2006	-	2008
International Convention for the Protection of All Persons from Enforced Disappearance	United Nations	2006	-	-
Optional Protocol to the International Covenant on Economic, Social and Cultural Rights	United Nations	2008	-	-
Optional Protocol to the Convention on the Rights of the Child on a Communications Procedure	United Nations	2011	-	-

== International criticism ==
On 26 July 2022, chairman of the US Senate Foreign Relations Committee raised concerns about the Rwandan government's human rights record and role in the conflict in the Democratic Republic of Congo. In a letter to US Secretary of State Antony Blinken, Senator Robert Menendez called for a comprehensive review of US policy towards Rwanda.

== See also ==
- Rwandan genocide
- Massacres of Hutus during the First Congo War
- Human trafficking in Rwanda
- Internet censorship and surveillance in Rwanda
- LGBT rights in Rwanda

== Notes ==
1.Note that the "Year" signifies the "Year covered". Therefore the information for the year marked 2008 is from the report published in 2009, and so on.
2.As of January 1.
3.The 1982 report covers the year 1981 and the first half of 1982, and the following 1984 report covers the second half of 1982 and the whole of 1983. In the interest of simplicity, these two aberrant "year and a half" reports have been split into three year-long reports through interpolation.
