= Kibeho Genocide Memorial =

- The Kibeho Genocide Memorial, August 2025
- Interactive map of Kibeho Genocide Memorial
- Location: Kibeho, Nyaruguru District, Southern Province, Rwanda
- Coordinates: 2.644822°S 29.553655°E
- Type: Genocide memorial
- Opening date: 13 April 1998
- Dedicated to: 1994 genocide against the Tutsi

The Kibeho Genocide Memorial is a memorial site for victims of the 1994 genocide against the Tutsi. It is located at the Catholic parish of Kibeho, in Nyaruguru District, in the Southern Province of Rwanda.

In April 1994, thousands of Tutsi who had sought refuge in the parish church were killed there. Part of the church is now a memorial. The remains of 28,937 victims are buried in mass graves in front of the church.

== Location ==
The memorial is at Kibeho, in Nyaruguru District. It stands at the Catholic parish, near the site of the reported apparitions of the Virgin Mary.

== History ==
Inside the memorial, August 2025

During the genocide, thousands of Tutsi fled to the parish of Kibeho. They came from the hills of Nyakizu, Gorwe and Munini. On 14 April 1994, Interahamwe militias surrounded the parish and attacked the refugees. Mass killings took place inside the church. Some people were burned inside it. About 43 people are believed to have survived the killings in the church.

Survivors say that a local priest helped to coordinate the killings at the parish and at a nearby school. On 7 May 1994, about 90 people were killed at the dormitory of the Mère du Verbe school. Estimates of the number of Tutsi killed at the parish range from about 28,000 to at least 50,000.

== Memorial ==
The memorial was created on 13 April 1998. The Catholic Church, genocide survivors and local authorities agreed to divide the church building into two parts. One part is still used for Mass. The other part serves as a genocide memorial.

The remains of 28,937 victims killed at Kibeho and in neighbouring sectors are buried in mass graves in front of the church. A monument bears the names of victims. Each year on 13 April, a commemoration is held at the memorial.

== See also ==
- Rwandan genocide
- List of Rwandan genocide memorials
- Kibeho
- Our Lady of Kibeho
- Kibeho massacre (1995)
- Murambi Genocide Memorial Centre
