= Kibeho massacre =

Massacre of refugees by the Rwandan Patriotic Front

- Part of the aftermath of the Rwandan genocide
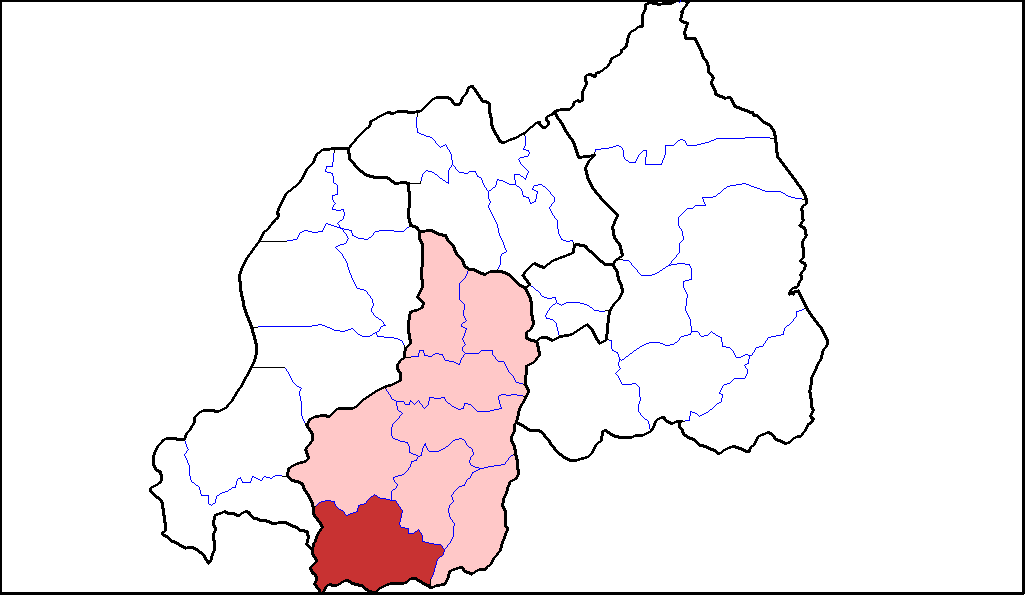
- Nyaruguru District, where Kibeho is located
- Location: Kibeho, Nyaruguru District, Southern Province, Rwanda
- Date: 22 April 1995
- Target: IDP camp
- Attack type: Massacre
- Deaths: 338–4,000+
- Perpetrator: Rwandan Patriotic Army

The Kibeho massacre occurred in a camp for internally displaced persons near Kibeho, in south-west Rwanda on 22 April 1995. Australian soldiers serving as part of the United Nations Assistance Mission for Rwanda estimated at least 4,000 people in the camp were killed by soldiers of the military wing of the Rwandan Patriotic Front, known as the Rwandan Patriotic Army. The Rwandan Government estimated the death toll to be 338.

== History ==
Following the Rwandan genocide and the victory by the army of the Tutsi-dominated Rwandan Patriotic Army (RPA), many ethnic Hutus, including an unknown number of those who had committed genocide, (Génocidaires) fled from the RPF-controlled areas to zones controlled by the French as part of Opération Turquoise and into the neighbouring states of Burundi, Zaire, and Tanzania. When the French withdrew in August 1994, the administration of a number of internally displaced persons (IDP) camps was taken over by the United Nations Assistance Mission for Rwanda (UNAMIR) and a number of aid organizations. The new Rwandan government, dominated by the victorious Rwandan Patriotic Front (RPF), wished to identify those individuals in the camps who had committed the genocide.

In late 1994, the large camps in the former so-called Safe Humanitarian Zones housed about 350,000 people. The UN set up an Integrated Operations Centre (IOC) to handle the caseload and managed to repatriate about 80,000 IDPs between October 1994 and January 1995. However, this period fortuitously coincided with the period when the new RPF government had reduced the activities of its kill squads after their activities were documented in the officially-denied Gersony Report. In January 1995, after RPF fears of Western sanctions had abated and the sanctioned killings had resumed, the IDPs refused to return to their home villages, where they would be vulnerable to the kill squads. By the third week of February, the OIC had basically stopped working and the camps were filling back up with villagers fleeing the violence in the hills. The UN field workers were caught in a Catch-22. "The government's hostility to the camps was profound, visceral...A large proportion of those who had taken shelter within Zone Turquoise were seen by the government as perpetrators of the genocide", in the words of the former director of the United Nations Rwanda Emergency Office (UNREO), and the RPF was contemptuous of the inadequate programs proposed by the UN bureaucracy. In contrast, scholar Gerard Prunier asserts that "the camps sheltered thousands of women and children as well as men who might or might not have been genocidaires." Meanwhile, UN headquarters in New York City insisted on proper procedures and close cooperation with the RPF government. The former UNREO director would later write, "The government was on board but never fully committed, allowing the humanitarian community to assume responsibility for an 'integrated' approach that in reality never existed." The IOC situation reports reflected its conflicting responsibilities, blaming a "deliberate campaign of disinformation" for IDPs refusing to leave the camps, while nearly simultaneously reporting "people return to the camps, fearing for their personal safety. There have been reports that some people are fleeing the communes and entering the camps for the first time."

== Kibeho Camp ==
By early 1995, the Kibeho IDP camp was the largest in Rwanda, sprawling for 9 square kilometers and containing between 80,000 and 100,000 people. UNAMIR presence at the camp was maintained by a Zambian infantry company, with medical services provided by Médecins Sans Frontières (MSF). The RPA maintained a tight cordon around the camp. Refugees wishing to leave the camp to return home had to pass through a checkpoint, where genocide survivors would point out individuals who had taken part in the 1994 killings.

On 17 April 1995, the préfet of Butare announced that all camps in the prefecture would be closed immediately. The declared aim of this was to forcibly separate known Génocidaires from those who would be sent home via a staging camp in nearby Butare. Taken by surprise, UNAMIR hastily dispatched 32 Australian soldiers and medical officers to support its presence in Kibeho, on 18 April.

Colonel P.G. Warfe of the Australian Army would later describe the events of that day:

On Tuesday 18 April at 0300 hrs two battalions of RPA soldiers surrounded Kibeho camp. The RPA used the expedient measure of firing shots in the air to move the IDPs along. One woman was shot in the hip and ten people, mostly children, were trampled to death... [The soldiers] torched many of the huts so that the IDPs would not return home. At 1630 hrs the RPA fired warning shots and nine more IDPs were killed in the resulting stampede.

The Tutsi RPF minister of rehabilitation, Jacques Bihozagara, held a press conference in which he noted, "There are rumours that if the IDPs return home they will be killed... If that were the government's intention then it would have gone ahead and killed the people within the camps. After all, the camps are within Rwandan territory." In contrast, the Hutu RPF minister of the interior, Seth Sendashonga, rushed to Kibeho the next day to stop the shooting and, upon his return to Kigali, held an emergency meeting of the UN and NGOs to arrange transport for the IDPs before the RPA lost all restraint. He further briefed Prime Minister Faustin Twagiramungu, President Pasteur Bizimungu and Vice President/Defense Minister Paul Kagame, who assured him that he would make sure things stayed under control. The next day soldiers opened fire again, killing twenty and killing sixty before surrounding the camp. Journalist and eyewitness Linda Polman, who was accompanying the approximately 80 Zambian soldiers from UNAMIR at Kibeho, described the situation that day:

[There were] about 150,000 refugees standing shoulder to shoulder on a mountain plateau the size of three football fields... For the last sixty hours the refugees had been forced to relieve themselves where they stand or where they have fallen. The stench takes my breath away... The refugees do nothing, say nothing, just stare at the Zambians... The two roads winding through the mountains to Kibeho have been closed. Food and water convoys from aid organisations are being stopped and sent back. The government has forbidden all refugee aid...A group of refugees, about six of them, break away and start running into the valley. Rwandan troops started firing immediately. We see the refugee fall dead. I scream at Capt. Francis [Zambian officer] "Stop them! Do something!"... He answers "We have been ordered to cooperate with the Rwandan authorities, not shoot at them." "Even if they kill innocent people before your eyes?" "Yes," he answers.

Several days of mounting tension between those in the camp and the RPF soldiers followed, with the RPF firing (at people and into the air) to control and move the refugees into an increasingly smaller area as processing of IDP continued. One of the Australian medics, Major Carol Vaughan-Evans recalled "I remember getting there four days preceding the massacre and we certainly weren't wanted. The Government forces [RPA] made that very, very clear... They insisted we only treat people who had decided to leave the camp... The government forces were extremely aggressive indicating that if we didn't empty the hospital they would...[by] killing people who remained"

On the morning of 22 April the UNAMIR force discovered about 100 refugees had been wounded or killed in the night. About half of those injured had gunshot wounds, presumably from RPA soldiers, the remainder machete wounds, presumably from Génocidaires who were "trying to terrorise the refugees into remaining in the camp… so as to provide a human shield."

== Massacre of 22 April 1995 ==
Not long after 10 am, in heavy rain, RPA forces began firing into the crowd in the hospital compound, causing a stampede of refugees against razor wire and barricades. RPA forces continued to fire at fleeing refugees for the next two hours. While initially firing into the massed crowd with rifles, the RPA later began using 60mm mortars. Corporal Paul Jordan wrote "we watched (and could do little more) as these people were hunted down and shot." The RPA slowed for a while after lunch before resuming fire until about 6 pm.

The MSF and Australian medical teams struggled to cope with the large numbers of wounded, many of whom were later evacuated to Kigali hospital. Despite this, the medical teams continued their work while the infantry sections brought in wounded to the clearing station and hospital, during breaks in the firing. During the morning the hospital was also moved, under fire, into the Zambian compound. Firing continued intermittently throughout the day. Jordan recalls seeing people being "killed all over the camp." The RPA also directed automatic rounds, rocket propelled grenades and .50 calibre machine gun fire at another wave of IDP who tried to break out after 5.00 pm.

== Casualties ==
The RPA began burying bodies during the night of 22–23 April. At daybreak of 23 April, Australian Medical Corps personnel began counting the dead. About 4200 were counted in the areas to which they had access, and they noted evidence that unseen bodies had already been removed. Terry Pickard's account states the RPA forced Australians to stop counting bodies "when they realised what was going on". The Australians estimated that there were still 400-500 bodies uncounted, not including those removed. Scholar Gérard Prunier posits that "a not unreasonable estimate" would be over 5000 dead. There were also many wounded, but not as many as would be expected as in combat, as most of the dead were bayoneted or shot at close range, and thus died of their wounds.

Minister Sendashonga had attempted to reach Kibeho on the morning of 23 April but was turned away by the army. President Bizimungu arrived that same afternoon and was told that there had been about three hundred casualties, which he accepted without comment. Bizimungu showed displeasure when a Zambian officer tried to present him with the figure compiled by the Australian unit. Both Rwandan government and UN officials minimized the numbers killed, giving public estimates of 330 and 2000 killed respectively. However, a series of photos taken by UN Provost Marshal Mark Cuthbert-Brown show some of the extent of the massacre on the morning of 23 April, as Zambian troops commenced moving bodies.

Interior Minister Sendashonga asked for an international commission of inquiry but was rebuffed by Kagame. An Independent International Commission of Inquiry, consisting of members handpicked by the RPF, was formed and led by RPF member Christine Omutonyi. After meeting in Kigali between 3 and 8 May, without any field visits, the commission reached a conclusion backing the government account of events that criminal or genocidaire elements were in the camp and that the massacre had happened when "there had been firing from the IDPs and the RPA suffered casualties... The RPA responded by firing into the crowd," and noted that they could not determine fatalities because of "logistics and time constraints". The government figure of 338 casualties has never been questioned by any official body.

Those IDPs who were forced to leave the camps were subject to attacks by crowds seeking vengeance for family killed during the genocide, as well as dehydration and exhaustion. On 24 April, the IOC announced that 145,228 IDPs had returned to Butare Prefecture from the camps, and two days later revised this figure down to 60,177. Prunier, attempting to make sense of these numbers, notes that if a low estimate of the pre-crisis Kibeho population (about 80,000) is taken as correct, this still means that at least 20,000 people "vanished." From this, Prunier concludes that it is likely that 20,000 to 30,000 former residents of Kibeho died after the massacre as a result of being expelled from the comparative safety of the camps. Hundreds of patients were evacuated to, triaged and treated at the UN hospital in Kigali operated by the Australian Defence Force. All age groups and both genders were represented with Defence clinicians working round the clock with limited staff and consumable resources. All areas of the hospital were overloaded, including wards, ICU and the operating theatre.

== Possible causes of the massacre ==
One Australian eyewitness notes that, "the events which occurred on that day are still not completely clear but one theory based on the reports of several eye witnesses and Intel reports is as follows":

As the processing slowly continued, people became very weary and restless. One casualty we received later told us they had been so crowded in by the RPA, without food or water, that they had been barely able to sit. The Interahamwe leaders in particular began to become concerned… as imprisonment or execution were very real possibilities for them. As a result, they began to harass the people and then to attack the crowd with machetes. Their reasons were probably two-fold - to create a diversion in order to escape and to silence potential informers. Whatever the reason, this resulted in panic amongst the crowd which began pushing against the RPA cordon. The RPA soldiers, fearing a riot, began to shoot into the crowd and soon most joined in, firing indiscriminately. Their motive soon became less crowd control and more revenge.

An account by Thomas Odom, the US Defence Attache in Kinshasa, described the cause in the same way: "Hard-liners (in the camp) drove other IDPs like cattle to try to break through RPA lines and the RPA commander lost control of the situation. His report adds; "the camp was heavily populated by people "involved in the 1994 genocide... and ... was an active insurgent base." Odom uses the UN estimate of 2000 killed.

Gérard Prunier, author of The Rwanda Crisis and Africa's World War, expresses skepticism of the claims that génocidaires were a significant factor in the massacre and characterizes the Kibeho as being a miniature version of the characteristics of the invasion of Zaire that would occur 18 months later: "nontreatment of the consequences of genocide, well-meaning but politically blind humanitarianism, RPF resolve to 'solve the problem' by force, stunned impotence of the international community in the face of violence, and, finally, a hypocritical denial that anything much had happened."

== Consequences of the massacre ==
The Kibeho Massacre, and its aftermath, began the final fracturing of the government of national unity that had been created in July 1994. Seth Sendashonga came to the conclusion that the Hutu were being collectively treated as murderers and being shot without trial. He proceeded to make himself a hindrance to the RPF, declaring that the many people arrested from Kibeho should not be held in crowded cells where they were suffocating to death and then canceling an attempt by Kigali mayor Rose Kabuye to distinguish current city residents from those residents returning from Zaire by color-coding their residency permits. After the Directorate of Military Intelligence (DMI) leaked a memo to the press identifying Sendashunga as linked to "extremist forces", he disbanded the Local Defense Forces (LDF), groups set up to replace police but largely turned into thugs under the direction of RPF rural leaders. Prime Minister Twagiramungu called a special security meeting on 23 August that reached a climax after three days when Sendashonga, Minister of Finance Marc Rugenera and Vice Prime Minister Alexis Kanyarengwe (all Hutus who had been publicly identified by the DMI as being potential traitors) were joined by Tutsi minister of women's affairs Aloysia Inyumba in confronting Kagame, especially over his recent selection of 117 Tutsis out of the 145 newly appointed bourmestres. Kagame responded by leaving the room, thus ending the meeting. After two days, Prime Minister Twagiramungu announced his resignation but President Bizimungu, furious at the rebellion within the ranks of the government, got Parliament to fire Twagiramungu on August 28. The next day, Sendashonga, Minister of Transport and Communications Immaculée Kayumba, Minister of Justice Alphonse-Marie Nkubito and Minister of Information Jean-Baptiste Nkuriyingoma were fired. Sendashonga and Twagiramungu were placed under house arrest, but were eventually allowed to leave the country unharmed by the end of the year. While the government of national unity ostensibly continued until the presidential crisis of 2000, these events destroyed it for all practical purposes.

Johan Pottier argues that the manner in which the RPF government restricted the access of journalists to information about Kibeho foreshadowed its approach in eastern Zaire later. He states, "Kibeho was a half-way stage in the development of Kagame's doctrine of tight information control."

=== Australian awards ===
Four Australians were awarded the Medal for Gallantry for their distinguished service at Kibeho, the first gallantry medals awarded to Australians since the Vietnam War; Corporal Andrew Miller, Warrant Officer Rod Scott, Lieutenant Thomas Tilbrook and Major (then Captain) Carol Vaughan-Evans. All available accounts indicate that the small Australian team found the event deeply distressing, and were frustrated both by being unable to encourage many of the IDP to return home before the massacre and being helpless to prevent it once it was underway. However, some commentaries claim that the Australian actions helped reduce the numbers killed and wounded. Writing in the Australian Army Journal, Paul Jordan, has said that: "While there was little that we could have done to stop the killings, I believe that, if Australians had not been there as witnesses to the massacre, the RPA would have killed every single person in the camp."

== See also ==
- List of massacres in Rwanda
- Our Lady of Kibeho
