= Africa's World War =

Africa's World War may refer to:

- First Congo War (1996–1997)
- Second Congo War (1998–2003)
- Africa's World War (book)
