= Rwanda: From Genocide to Precarious Peace =

2018 non-fiction book by Susan Thomson

Rwanda: From Genocide to Precarious Peace is a 2018 non-fiction book by Susan Thomson, published by Yale University Press.

The book describes rule of Rwanda by the Rwandan Patriotic Front (RPF) and Paul Kagame after the Rwandan Genocide had occurred.

The author argues that increasing wealth inequality has led to behind-the-scenes political strife.

== Background ==
Thomson wrote about Rwanda in Whispering Truth to Power: Everyday Resistance to Reconciliation in Postgenocide Rwanda in 2013.

The author conducted interviews with Rwandans, including ordinary people and pro-RPF high status individuals, as well as field work. In addition the author used the Gersony Report and other official documents as sources.

== Contents ==
The book has an introduction. Thomson argues that the common public image of post-genocide Rwanda as being peaceful is not accurate.

The genocide is described in the first part, "Genocide: its causes and consequences," which has 60 pages, divided into three chapters. Thomson stated her belief that political power and not ethnic division was the driving factor behind the genocide. She also describes the actions the RPF took in the pre-genocide, genocide, and post-genocide periods.

The second part, the fourth through seventh chapters, describes the period that occurred immediately after the end of the genocide.

"Setting up for success," the third part, describes RPF welfare programs, including anti-poverty programs. It includes chapters 8 through 10.

Other aspects of RPF rule is described in the fourth part, "The fruits of Liberation." Chapters 9 and 10 are in this part.

The end part of the book examines whether a repeat of genocide is likely in the future. The author argued that in the immediate future there are no signs of such a repeat but that such is possible further into the future.

== Reception ==
Aditi Malik of College of the Holy Cross argued that the work has "a compelling critique of the RPF's reconstruction model". Malik criticized Chapter 12 for not giving enough information on how the usage of language builds loyalty to the RPF, and that the chapter was "hurried".

Kathryn Mara of University of Wisconsin praised the book for being "laboriously researched" though she argued that adding "a more comparative analysis" would make the work better. Mara explained how the RPF political actions impact rank and file Rwandans.

W. R. Pruitt of Virginia Wesleyan University argued that the book had undue bias against the Rwandan government and that at times was misleading in its criticisms.

Herman T. Salton of International Christian University stated that the work is "engaging, well-researched and important".

Anneleen Spiessens described the book as having "a compelling case for a power-political analysis".
