= Théogène Turatsinze =

Théogène Turatsinze (born "in the northern part" of Rwanda c. 1970, murdered between 11 and 15 October 2012 in Mozambique) was a Rwandan businessman.

After undergraduate studies in his home country, he moved to Mozambique, "where he worked for several years", then completed his studies with a master's degree in management at the Australian Catholic University in Sydney. He returned to Rwanda, and became the Managing Director of the Rwanda Development Bank (BRD) in 2005. He was dismissed from that position in 2007. He moved once more to Mozambique, where he served as deputy rector of the São Tomãs de Moçambique Catholic University until his death.

He went missing on 11 or 12 October 2012, in Maputo. His body was found on the 15th, tied up and "floating in the sea". Police in Mozambique "initially indicated Rwandan government involvement in the killing", then retracted the accusation. Turatsinze was thought to have "had access to politically sensitive financial information related to certain Rwandan government insiders", relating to the funds of the Development Bank. His murder, which remains unsolved, was described as part of a "history of mysterious deaths" of opponents or perceived opponents of the Paul Kagame government in Rwanda. The newspaper The Zimbabwean related it to the deaths of Seth Sendashonga (a high-level political opponent murdered in Kenya in 1998), Jean-Léonard Rugambage (a reporter murdered in Kigali in 2010), and Charles Ingabire (a reporter murdered in Uganda in 2011); it also mentioned Kayumba Nyamwasa, a former member of Rwandan Intelligence who survived an assassination attempt in 2010. Similarly, the UK's Channel 4 News linked Turatsinze's deaths to those mentioned, as well as to that of politician André Kagwa Rwisereka, murdered in 2010, noting the "allegations of Rwandan government involvement".

== See also ==
- Politics of Rwanda
- Human rights in Rwanda
