= Gersony Report =

Gersony Report is the name given to the 1994 findings made by a team under Robert Gersony, which was under contract to the United Nations High Commissioner for Refugees and identified a pattern of massacres by the Rwandan Patriotic Front rebels during and after their military victory in the civil war in post-genocide Rwanda. The findings were suppressed by the United Nations and involved governments for political reasons, and its existence was denied. No final written report was ever completed, though purported early written documentation has been leaked. The validity of Gersony's purported findings continue to be disputed.

== Research ==
Robert Gersony, a freelance American consultant who had extensive experience in war zones in Africa, particularly Mozambique and Somalia, was hired by the United Nations High Commissioner for Refugees to conduct a refugee survey in preparation for encouraging Rwandans who had fled the country in the wake of the Rwandan genocide and rebel victory in the Rwandan Civil War to return home. Gersony and his assistants began the work broadly sympathetic to the new government of the mostly-Tutsi Rwandan Patriotic Front (RPF), as was common among those who saw the effects of the genocide. In the course of their fieldwork, the three-person team became convinced that the RPF had carried out "clearly systematic murders and persecution of the Hutu population in certain parts of the country."

The team were granted free travel by the RPF, who expected the refugee study to help their efforts to repatriate refugees, and saw more of the country and talked to more people than any other foreigners in Rwanda at that time. Specifically, between 1 August and 5 September 1994 the Gersony team visited 91 sites in forty-one of the 145 communes of Rwanda, mostly in the areas of Kibungo, Gisenyi and Butare. They further gathered information on about ten other communes and carried out interviews in nine refugee camps in surrounding countries. Over the course of their work, the team conducted more than two hundred individual interviews and conducted another one hundred small group discussions.

Purported findings of the team include the alleged 2 August massacre of about 150 civilians attempting to cross back into northwest Rwanda from Zaire by the RPF, as well as systematic arrest and apparent forced disappearance of a large number of men in Gisenyi. In Butare, part of Kigali, and Kibungo to the south and southeast, the team reported indiscriminate massacres of civilians who had come to meetings convened by local government authorities, house-to-house killing of civilians, organized searches to kill civilians who were hiding in the brush, and ambushes of civilians attempted to flee across the border into Burundi. The report concluded that "the great majority of these killings had apparently not been motivated by any suspicion whatsoever of personal participation by victims in the massacres of Tutsi in April 1994." Gersony's personal conclusion was that between April and August 1994, the RPF had killed "between 25,000 and 45,000 persons, between 5,000 and 10,000 persons each month from April through July and 5,000 for the month of August."

== Findings reported ==
Gersony reported his findings to Madame Sadako Ogata, UNHCR High Commissioner, who in turn informed Secretary-General Boutros Boutros-Ghali. Boutros-Ghali sent then-Assistant Secretary General Kofi Annan and UNHCR Africa director Kamel Morjane to Kigali. Upon his arrival, Annan and several subordinates were briefed by Gersony, who stated that he recognized that his conclusions were opposite to that otherwise found by the UN but that he was willing to stake his 25 year reputation on its validity. The UN officials and Gersony then had a meeting with Minister of the Interior Seth Sendashonga, Minister of Foreign Affairs Jean Marie Vianney, and Prime Minister Faustin Twagiramungu, who stated that it would be impossible for the government to kill 30,000 people secretly, that it was unlikely that the RPA would travel with hoes, machetes and clubs as contended in the report, and that the President himself had gone to investigate reports of RPA atrocities along the Tanzanian border and had found no evidence and concluded that Hutu extremists in the Tanzanian camps were inciting fear in the refugee population.

Shaharyar Khan, UN Special Representative to Rwanda, who was present at the meeting with the government officials, would express his belief that an elevated level of revenge killings had occurred in border regions but that, "I do not accept Gersoni's [sic] conclusion that the killings are part of a 'pre-ordained, systematic massacre ordered from the top.'" Annan expressed his belief that killings were ongoing but that he hoped the killings were not deliberate and promised the officials that the UN would embargo Gersony's findings to give the new government a chance to gain control of the situation. General Guy Tousignant, head of the UN Assistance Mission for Rwanda, was more blunt to other ministers he later met, informing them that Gersony was probably correct and that the killings must stop. In the meantime, UNHCR, who had commissioned the report, stopped its repatriations of refugees back into Rwanda.

The contents of Gersony's findings were leaked to the international press, infuriating the RPF government. Great Lakes historian Gérard Prunier writes that the UN promised the Rwandan government that they would embargo the document and instructed Gersony to never discuss their findings. Alison Des Forges, Rwanda expert for Human Rights Watch and publisher of some of the key materials on the 'Gersony report', goes further in writing that Gersony was told to not write a report and that his entire team was told to keep silent about their findings.

A three and a half-page memorandum was drafted for internal use, from which a two-and-a-half page memo was prepared for the special rapporteur on Rwanda of the UN Human Rights Commission. When the special rapporteur attempted in April 1996 to learn more about Gersony's findings, he received the reply, "We wish to inform you that the 'Gersony Report' does not exist. [emphasis in original]"

Gersony himself has kept his word to never publicly discuss his findings, resulting in the 'Gersony Report' achieving "an almost mythical dimension." In September 2010, a website released what is claimed to be an internal UN written summary of the oral presentation made by Gersony, as well as several field reports made by his team during the course of their research.
