= Africa's World War (book) =

2009 non-fiction book

- Author: Gérard Prunier
- Publisher: C. Hurst & Co., Oxford University Press
- Publication date: 2009
- ISBN: 1-85065-523-5
- OCLC: 299940602

Africa's World War: Congo, the Rwandan Genocide, and the Making of a Continental Catastrophe, originally published as From Genocide to Continental War: The 'Congolese' Conflict and the Crisis of Contemporary Africa is a non-fiction book by French historian Gérard Prunier. It was originally published in 2009 by C. Hurst & Co., and then republished in the United States of America later that same year under a new title by Oxford University Press. In the book, Prunier discusses events starting from the Rwandan genocide and the collapse of Zaire through the Second Congo War and the years afterward.

Prunier dedicated the book to Seth Sendashonga.

== Reception ==
Anthony Court, in Holocaust and Genocide Studies, compared the book favourably with Prunier's previous work, calling it "more critical and ambitious". Court in particular noted how Prunier's treatment of the Rwandan Patriotic Front had shifted since he wrote The Rwanda Crisis, and how he had moved from looking only at their success in ending the Rwandan genocide, but also their war crimes and attempts to establish what he termed an "ethnic dictatorship" in Rwanda. However, Court criticised what he felt were the book's "weaknesses"; namely, the lack of focus, the lack of evidence set forth claims about American involvement, and describes Prunier's "peripheral concerns" as "distracting" to the overall book.

A Financial Times review by William Wallis was less critical; in his review, Wallis described it as an "ambitious" attempt to explain the conflict that would make "uncomfortable reading" that was critical of Western interference in the conflicts. Similarly, R. W. Johnson described the book as "remarkable" due to Prunier's writing and his personal experience in the conflict itself. Johnson notes also Prunier's distaste for the Western responses, as well as his comparison of the local combatants to "vampires" due to their part-time nature as fighters, their reluctance to engage with other armies, and their need to loot and pillage civilian targets to survive.

== Bibliography ==
Prunier, Gérard (2009). Africa's World War: Congo, the Rwandan Genocide, and the Making of Continental Catastrophe. Oxford University Press. ISBN 978-0-19-537420-9.
