= Whispering Truth to Power =

2013 non-fiction book by Susan Thomson

Whispering Truth to Power: Everyday Resistance to Reconciliation in Postgenocide Rwanda is a 2013 non-fiction book by Susan Thomson, published by University of Wisconsin Press.

According to Erin Jessee of University of Strathclyde, the book is part of a trend in which books are "increasingly critical" towards the Rwandan Patriotic Front (RPF), the party governing Rwanda, and the head of said party, Paul Kagame.

== Background ==
The author interviewed 37 people from Rwanda as part of her research. The interviews were done in 2006.

== Contents ==
The book includes an introduction, a glossary, and six chapters. The introduction covers the research subjects.

The book described the gacaca trials and argues that such involved forced forgiveness of people who committed acts of murder imposed upon relatives of victims and that it did not recognize Hutu people as victims, and that Rwandans responded by refusing to be a part of gacaca and spreading insults against people in the Rwandan government. Maria G. Krause of Queen's University at Kingston stated that the gacaca "reduced and silenced the experiences of many Rwandans".

== Reception ==
Jessee praised the work as "a solid and engaging book". She stated that it had "rich, ethnographically informed insights". She argued that the work "provides a powerful challenge" to the positive reception of the governance style of the RPF stated by groups outside of Rwanda and by the RPF itself.

Krause praised the book as being "an innovative approach to research in post-genocide Rwandan society."

Silke Oldenburg of the University of Basel praised the data related to ethnography, describing it as "this book's strength". Oldenburg stated that the glossary was "helpful". She however argued that the interview content "seem to confirm too smoothly" the arguments the author makes in the book.

== See also ==
- Rwanda: From Genocide to Precarious Peace - Another book by Thomson
