= Human trafficking in Rwanda =

Rwanda ratified the 2000 UN TIP Protocol in September 2003.

In 2010 Rwanda was a source and, to a lesser extent, destination country for women and children subjected to trafficking in persons, specifically conditions of forced labor and commercial sexual exploitation. Rwandan girls were exploited in involuntary domestic servitude within the country; some of these children experienced physical or sexual abuse within their employer's household. Older females offered vulnerable younger girls room and board, eventually pushing them into prostitution to pay for their keep. In limited cases, this trafficking was facilitated by women who supplied females to clients or by loosely organized prostitution networks, some operating in secondary schools and universities. Rwandan children were also trafficked to Uganda, Tanzania, and other countries in the region for forced agricultural labor, commercial sexual exploitation, and domestic servitude, sometimes after being recruited by peers. In Rwanda there have been reports of isolated cases involving child trafficking victims from neighboring countries. Unlike in past years, there was no indication in 2009 that the National Congress for the Defence of the People (CNDP) duped or recruited Congolese men and boys from Rwanda-based refugee camps, as well as Rwandans from nearby towns, into forced labor and soldiering in the Democratic Republic of the Congo.

In 2009 the Government of Rwanda did not fully comply with the minimum standards for the elimination of trafficking; however, it made significant efforts to do so. During 2009, the government enacted a new labour code prohibiting forced labor and the enslavement of children; advanced penal code revisions containing anti-trafficking provisions through the legislative process; opened a care center for victims of gender-based violence, including trafficking victims; and launched a public awareness campaign on the commercial sexual exploitation of children. Rwanda remains the only African country in which the government is undertaking virtually all activities related to the demobilization and reintegration of former child soldiers. While government officials are quick to recognize and respond to suspected cases of transnational child trafficking, some officials do not believe internal trafficking is possible because of the country's small size and the government's effective security measures. Additional training is greatly needed to increase officials' awareness of the nature of human trafficking and to provide practical skills for responding to it.

The U.S. State Department's Office to Monitor and Combat Trafficking in Persons placed the country on the "Tier 2 Watchlist" in 2017. By 2023, the country had moved to the Tier 2 category.

In 2023 the Organised Crime Index gave Rwanda a score of 5 out of 10 for human trafficking, noting that tighter border security had reduced the number of victims being taken out of the country.

== Prosecution (2009) ==
The government's anti-trafficking law enforcement efforts increased modestly during the reporting period. Rwandan law does not prohibit all forms of trafficking in persons, though existing penal and labor code statutes prohibit slavery, forced labor, forced prostitution, and child prostitution, under which traffickers could be prosecuted. Law No. 58/2008 outlaws, but does not define, human trafficking for sexual exploitation and prescribes punishments of 15 to 20 years' imprisonment. In May 2009, the government enacted the "Law Regulating Labor in Rwanda" (13/2009), which prohibits forced labor and prescribes punishment of three to five years' imprisonment; it also prohibits subjecting children to slavery, child trafficking, debt bondage, forced labor, armed conflict, and child prostitution, and prescribes punishment of six months to 20 years' imprisonment for these offenses. Taken together, these penalties are sufficiently stringent and commensurate with penalties prescribed for other serious offenses, such as rape. In December 2009, parliament's Chamber of Deputies passed revisions to the penal code, which contain articles defining and prohibiting human trafficking; the penal code is now under consideration by the Senate. A separate draft comprehensive anti-trafficking bill remained under review.

The government prosecuted no human trafficking offenses in 2009. Police investigated and forwarded for prosecution at least two cases of suspected child trafficking; as of March 2010, the National Public Prosecution Authority was still investigating these cases, both of which involved adults apprehended with children at the border with Uganda. Labor inspectors issued warnings and levied fines against those illegally employing children; no cases of forced labor were brought to court. While the government provided training on sex crimes and crimes against children as part of the standard police training curriculum, law enforcement officials received no trafficking-specific training. Police officers, however, made two presentations on trafficking to district police commanders and senior police officials in 2009.

== Protection (2009) ==
With the exception of its care for former child combatants, many of whom are trafficking victims, the government provided few protective services to victims overall. The Rwandan Demobilization and Reintegration Commission (RDRC), with World Bank and limited government funding, continued operation of a center for child ex-combatants in Muhazi, which provided three months of care to children returned from the DRC by the UN Mission to the Congo. After undergoing initial screening at the adult demobilization center in Mutobo, 49 children arrived at the center in 2009 and seven in January 2010. The RDRC worked with local authorities and an NGO to locate the children's families, and social workers sensitized the families before their child's return; in 2009, 75 children were reunited with their families. During the reintegration phase, approximately 10 percent of children entered formal education, 40 percent received vocational training, and 50 percent undertook income generating activities.

In July 2009, the police, UNICEF, and a foundation chaired by Rwanda's First Lady opened the Isange Center, a one-stop holistic center that provides medical exams, counseling, short-term shelter, and police assistance to victims of gender-based violence, including trafficking victims. This one-year pilot project, located in the National Police Hospital, provided services to 367 victims of gender-based violence between July and December 2009, 218 of whom were children. The police headquarters in Kigali operated a hotline and examination room for victims of gender-based violence; both were staffed by counselors and could be used by trafficking victims. Fully equipped examination rooms were also operational in Gasabo and Rwamagana. Each police station nationwide has a gender desk, trained officer, and public outreach program. During the year, however, police arrested girls in prostitution and detained them at Kigali's Gikondo transit center; some girls were kept there three to six months despite not being charged with a crime or screened for victimization. The government has not developed a system for proactively identifying human trafficking victims among vulnerable populations or created a referral process to transfer such victims to service providers for care. The government encouraged victims to participate in investigations of trafficking crimes. Beyond providing a stay of one month, existing legal statutes do not provide foreign trafficking victims with legal alternatives to their removal to a country where they may face hardship or retribution.

== Prevention (2009) ==
The government's anti-trafficking prevention efforts increased during the reporting period. While government officials are quick to recognize and respond to suspected cases of transnational child trafficking, some officials believe internal trafficking is not possible due to Rwanda's small size and efficacy of government security measures. There is also a general lack of understanding among the general population of what constitutes human trafficking. In May 2009, the Ministry of Youth and the National AIDS Control Commission designed and launched, with foreign donor funding, a six-month campaign against the commercial sexual exploitation of children by people identified by the government as "sugar daddies" and "sugar mommies"; the campaign, entitled "Sinigurisha!" (I am not for sale!), included TV and radio spots, print materials, billboards, and community events. During the period, the Ministry of Public Service and Labor (MIFOTRA) trained the government's 30 district labor inspectors how to identify and respond to cases of child labor; inspectors held quarterly training sessions for employers and local authorities on child labor issues. In February and March 2010, MIFOTRA conducted campaigns in each district to sensitize private sector employers and their employees on the 2009 Labor Law, including the provisions against utilizing child labor. District child labor task forces met bi-monthly and conducted sensitization activities on the dangers and illegality of exploiting child labor. In March 2010, local authorities and security personnel in Gakenke implemented the district's child labor bylaws by detaining 350 primary school pupils at the market, some of whom were forced by their parents to porter and sell goods rather than attend school. Before releasing the children, the district mayor advised their parents to take advantage of the opportunity for free education. Police and immigration officials maintained strict border control measures that were a key component to prevention of cross-border trafficking. The government provided training on gender sensitivity and sexual exploitation to Rwandan troops prior to their deployment on UN peacekeeping missions in Darfur.

== See also ==
- Human rights in Rwanda
- Developing human rights-based strategies to improve health among female sex workers in Rwanda
