= Susan Thomson =

Professor of peace and conflict studies at Colgate University

Susan Michelle Thomson (born 1968) is a Canadian human rights lawyer and professor of peace and conflict studies at Colgate University. She worked in Rwanda for years in various capacities and is known for her books focusing on the post-genocide history of the country, which have received good reviews. Although she initially supported the ruling Rwandan Patriotic Front (RPF), Thomson later reevaluated her position.

Her critical scholarship led her to be declared persona non grata in Rwanda in 2007.

== Life ==
At the age of 23 she began working for the UN in Africa, initially the United Nations Operation in Somalia, later in Madagascar and Rwanda, where she witnessed the 1994 Rwandan genocide and escaped to Uganda. In 1995, she began work on a law degree at University College London; from 1998 to 2001, she taught law at National University of Rwanda, before returning to Canada for a doctoral program at Dalhousie University. In 2006, she returned to Rwanda to do fieldwork. Rwandan officials, suspicious of her interviews with a Hutu who had been imprisoned after the genocide, confiscated her passport and forced her to attend "re-education" sessions for five weeks, before she managed to escape. The following year she was declared persona non grata. In 2009, Thomson received her doctorate from Dalhousie University.

She worked at Hampshire College as a postdoctoral fellow beginning in June 2010 and ending in June 2012.

== Research ==
In 2013, Thomson published Whispering Truth to Power: Everyday Resistance to Reconciliation in Postgenocide Rwanda, which investigates how ordinary Rwandan citizens react to state programs mandating national reconciliation. She demonstrates that the state program does not benefit all Rwandans and is intended to bolster the power of select elites. The book was praised by historian Erin Jessee for "offering rich, ethnographically informed insights"; Jessee stated that Thomson "provides a powerful challenge to the claims of both the Rwandan government and the international community that the RPF’s program of national unity and reconciliation is affecting positive change in Rwanda".

In 2018, Thomson published Rwanda: From Genocide to Precarious Peace. In the book, she argues that Rwanda's political culture has not changed significantly since the civil war and finds that the country's "elite rule-makers have little understanding of the lived, ground-level realities of ordinary citizens". Political scientist Aditi Malik writes that Thomson offers "a perspective that Kagame’s supporters have largely missed... she convincingly shows that Rwanda’s rural majority has been left out of the RPF’s vision of security, peace, development, and democracy". International relations scholar Herman T. Salton states that Thomson's arguments are convincing and that her conclusion—that "Kagame’s methods resemble those of his predecessors in more ways than one"—is "ominous... particularly for a country whose people have already suffered so much".

== Views ==
Thomson formerly supported the ruling Rwandan Patriotic Front (RPF) that took power after the genocide, stating "I was not totally blind to [their] shortcomings but felt that their authoritarian practices [e.g., the executions that she documented in early 1998] were necessary to rebuild a peaceful and secure Rwanda". Later, she felt that she had been "duped". In 2014, she wrote a New York Times op-ed criticizing forced disappearances and assassinations by the RPF. Along with her academic work, Thomson also writes affidavits for Rwandan refugees seeking asylum in other countries.

== Works ==
- Thomson, Susan (2013). Whispering Truth to Power: Everyday Resistance to Reconciliation in Postgenocide Rwanda. University of Wisconsin Press. ISBN 978-0-299-29674-2.
- 2013. Thomson, Susan, An Ansoms, and Jude Murison, eds. Emotional and Ethical Challenges for Field Research in Africa: The Story Behind the Findings. London: Palgrave Macmillan, pp. 169.
- Thomson, Susan (2018). Rwanda: From Genocide to Precarious Peace. Yale University Press. ISBN 978-0-300-23591-3.
- April 2021. An Ansoms, Anymar Bisoka Nyenyezi, and Susan Thomson, eds. Field Research in Africa: The Ethics of Researcher Vulnerabilities. London: James Currey.
