= Robert Gersony =

Robert Gersony is an American consultant known for his reports on conflict-affected countries, in particular in Africa. His most famous work, the 1994 "Gersony Report", was never actually finished. The "Gersony Report" was suppressed by the United Nations, who had originally commissioned it, because it had reached the politically embarrassing conclusion that the Rwandan Patriotic Front, which had taken control of the country after the Rwandan genocide, was carrying out politically motivated mass killing. The Anguish of Northern Uganda, a report commissioned by the US Embassy in Kampala, is arguably the most cited source on the Lord's Resistance Army insurgency.

Robert D. Kaplan, in his biography of Gersony, The Good American: The Epic Life of Bob Gersony, the US Government’s Greatest Humanitarian (2021), described Gersony as leading "a frugal monastic existence that has been both obscure and extraordinary". John S Gardner, reviewing the book, said that Gersony's work improved the lives of millions, saving many".

== Published works ==
- "Rebels Create Havoc in Mozambique." Cultural Survival Quarterly. Volume 12 #2 1988. pp. 31–40.
- "Summary of Mozambican Refugee Accounts of Principally Conflict-Related Experience in Mozambique" (PDF). Archived from the original (PDF) on March 18, 2009. for Bureau of Refugee Programs, United States Department of State, April 1988
- "Why Somalis Flee: Synthesis of Accounts of Conflict Experience in Northern Somalia by Somali Refugees, Displaced Persons and Others" (PDF). Archived from the original (PDF) on October 7, 2006. for Bureau of Refugee Programs, United States Department of State, August 1989
- "The Anguish of Northern Uganda: Results of a Field-Based Assessment of the Civil Conflicts in Northern Uganda" (PDF). Archived from the original (PDF) on September 28, 2011. for United States Embassy-Kampala and USAID Mission-Kampala, August 1997
- "Sowing the Wind...: History and Dynamics of the Maoist Revolt in Nepal's Rapti Hills" (PDF). for Mercy Corps International, October 2003
