= André Kagwa Rwisereka =

Rwandan politician (1949–2010)

Vice-President of the Democratic Green Party
- In office 14 August 2009 – 13 July 2010

Personal details
- Born: 31 December 1949 Nyaruguru, Southern Province, Rwanda
- Died: 13 July 2010 (aged 60) Butare, Southern Province, Rwanda
- Cause of death: Assassination
- Party: Democratic Green Party of Rwanda

André Kagwa Rwisereka (31 December 1949 – 13 July 2010) was vice-chairman of the Democratic Green Party of Rwanda, a political party founded in August 2009 until his assassination in July 2010.

== Biography ==
Rwisereka was born on 31 December 1949 in Rusenge, Nyaruguru, Southern Province, Rwanda. In the early 1960s he went into political exile in the Democratic Republic of Congo, where he was a senior member of the Rwandan Patriotic Front during its struggle to liberate Rwanda. After returning to Rwanda he became a prominent businessman in Butare. He was a founding member of the Democratic Green Party of Rwanda on 14 August 2009.

Rwisereka was also principal of Form Four program educational secondary school in RDC called Institut Mapambazuko de Kiliba from 1975-77, married for short-time to the niece of the Legal Representative of the Pentecostal Churches Association in Zaïre. The divorce was consumed due to his political agenda with FPR.

== Death ==
Vice-President of the Democratic Green Party of Rwanda Andre Rwisereka was found murdered and partially beheaded near a wetland in Butare on 14 July 2010. He had been driving a pickup truck. The party chairman (president) Frank Habineza was among opposition leaders who called for an independent international investigation into the murder, which may have had a political motivation. This murder was preceded by threats against the Democratic Green Party of Rwanda, with police disrupting their political activities.

The Green Party of Canada criticized this murder and called for justice.

== See also ==
Other opponents or perceived opponents of the Rwandan government murdered between 2010 and 2012:

- Charles Ingabire (journalist)
- Jean-Léonard Rugambage (journalist)
- Théogène Turatsinze (businessman)
