= Killing of Jean-Léonard Rugambage =

Rwandan journalist

Jean-Léonard Rugambage was a Rwandan journalist, acting editor of the newspaper Umuvugizi. He was murdered after an assailant shot him four times in front of his home in Kigali on 24 June 2010.

The newspaper had recently been suspended by the government, but continued to publish articles online. Rugambage was "highly critical" of President Paul Kagame's government. Shortly before being murdered, Rugambage had published an article on the attempted murder of former army chief Lieutenant-General Faustin Kayumba Nyamwasa, another critic of Kagame's. As Rugambage's murder was one of several of Kagame's critics and opponents during the build-up to the 2010 presidential election, his colleagues suggested national security services could have been involved. Four days later, police arrested two suspects in connection with the murder. According to the authorities, one of them, Didace Nduguyangu, confessed and explained to the police that he had "committed this act to take revenge on this journalist who massacred his brother during the genocide against the Tutsis in 1994." But for whose death Rugambage had been acquitted by courts in 2006 after being detained for 11 months in 2005. United Nations Secretary-General Ban Ki-moon called for an investigation into the murders of several government opponents during the election campaign, including Rugambage's.

== See also ==
Other opponents or perceived opponents of the Rwandan government murdered between 2010 and 2012:

- Charles Ingabire
- André Kagwa Rwisereka
- Théogène Turatsinze
