= Charles Ingabire =

Rwandan journalist

Charles Ingabire (died 30 November 2011) was a Rwandan journalist and the editor of the Kinyarwanda-language news website Inyenyeri News.

Prior to 2007, Ingabire was the editor of the Kigali-based newspaper Umuco. From 2007 to 2011 he lived in Kampala, Uganda and was an outspoken critic of the Rwandan government. On 30 November 2011 he was shot dead at a Kampala pub.

== See also ==
- Jean-Léonard Rugambage
- André Kagwa Rwisereka
- Théogène Turatsinze
