= Aloisea Inyumba =

Rwandan politician

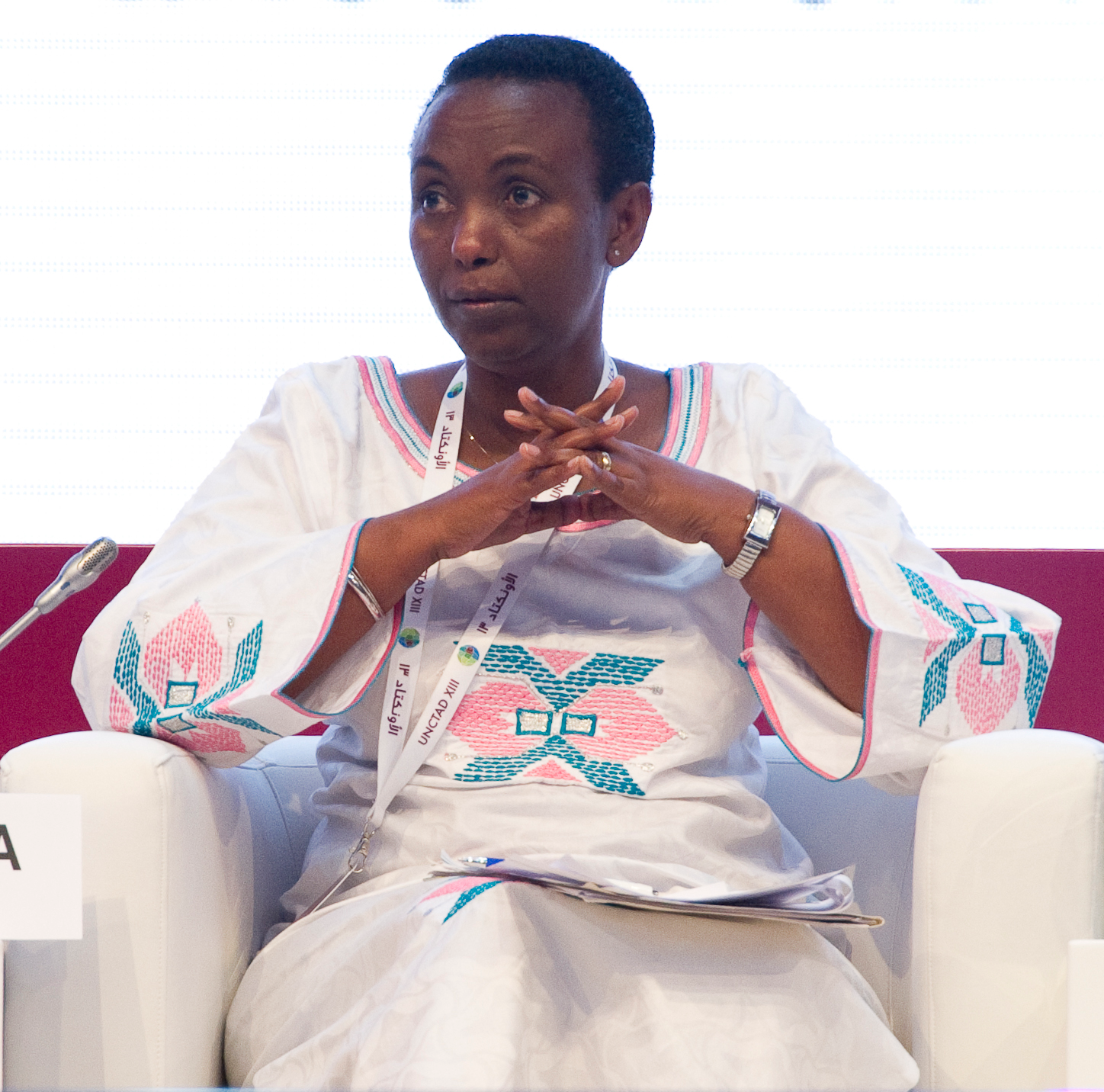
- Aloisea Inyumba at the UNCTAD XIII High Level Event on Women in Development, April 2012

Minister for Gender and Family Promotion

Personal details
- Born: 28 December 1964 in Uganda,
- Died: 6 December 2012 her home in Kigali
- Spouse: Dr Richard Masozera
- Education: Makerere University

Aloisea Inyumba (28 December 1964 – 6 December 2012) was a Rwandan politician, who was the country's Minister for Gender and Family Promotion and as executive secretary of the National Unity and Reconciliation Commission.

While studying social work and social administration at Makerere University in Uganda, she joined the Rwandan Patriotic Front.

The eulogy at her funeral was given by President Paul Kagame.

== Early life ==
Aloisea Inyumba was born on 28 December 1964 in Uganda, to Rwandan born parents. She was born in the aftermath of the 1959 Rwandan Revolution, which saw the creation of a republic dominated by the majority Hutu, and persecution of the minority Tutsi. While her parents were still living in Rwanda, and before she was born, her father was killed in a massacre of Tutsi; her mother escaped with her five siblings and the family fled to the safety of Uganda.

Inyumba lived her childhood in Uganda, completing her schooling there, and then proceeded to Makerere University in Kampala, to study for a degree in social work and social administration. In 1985, she had her first meeting with Paul Kagame, another Rwandan refugee who was at the time serving in the rebel army of Yoweri Museveni. One year later, Museveni took control of the country and promoted Kagame and fellow Rwandan Fred Rwigyema to officers in the country's national army. Kagame and Rwigyema took these positions, but their ultimate goal was to return with force to their own country, in order to facilitate the return of the refugees. Kagame and Rwigyema joined and took over the Rwandan Patriotic Front, a Rwandan liberation organisation, and Inyumba joined as well.

== Political career ==
After the RPF military victory in July 1994, Inyumba was appointed into the newly formed transitional government. This government was headed by President Pasteur Bizimungu, but the country was de facto led by Paul Kagame. She was appointed to the post of Minister of Gender and Family Promotion, and began a concerted programme to involve women in the rebuilding of Rwanda.

In 2011, she was re-appointed to her previous role of Minister of Gender and Family Promotion, a role she held until her death in 2012.

== Personal life and death ==
Inyumba was married to Dr Richard Masozera, who is the former Director-General of Rwanda Civil Aviation Authority (RCAA). The pair began dating when they were both students at Makerere University in Kampala. They had two children, a girl and a boy.

Inyumba died on 6 December 2012 at her home in Kigali. She had been suffering from throat cancer, and had recently returned home after seeking treatment in Germany. Inyumba was granted a state funeral at the Parliament of Rwanda building in Kigali and her eulogy was delivered by the country's president, Paul Kagame. Kagame described her as a selfless leader who was "a very good cadre and ideologically clear". Other speakers at the funeral included Cabinet Affairs minister Protais Musoni and the vice-governor of the National Bank of Rwanda, Monique Nsanzabaganwa.

== See also ==
- Parliament of Rwanda
