= Kibeho =

- Sector and town
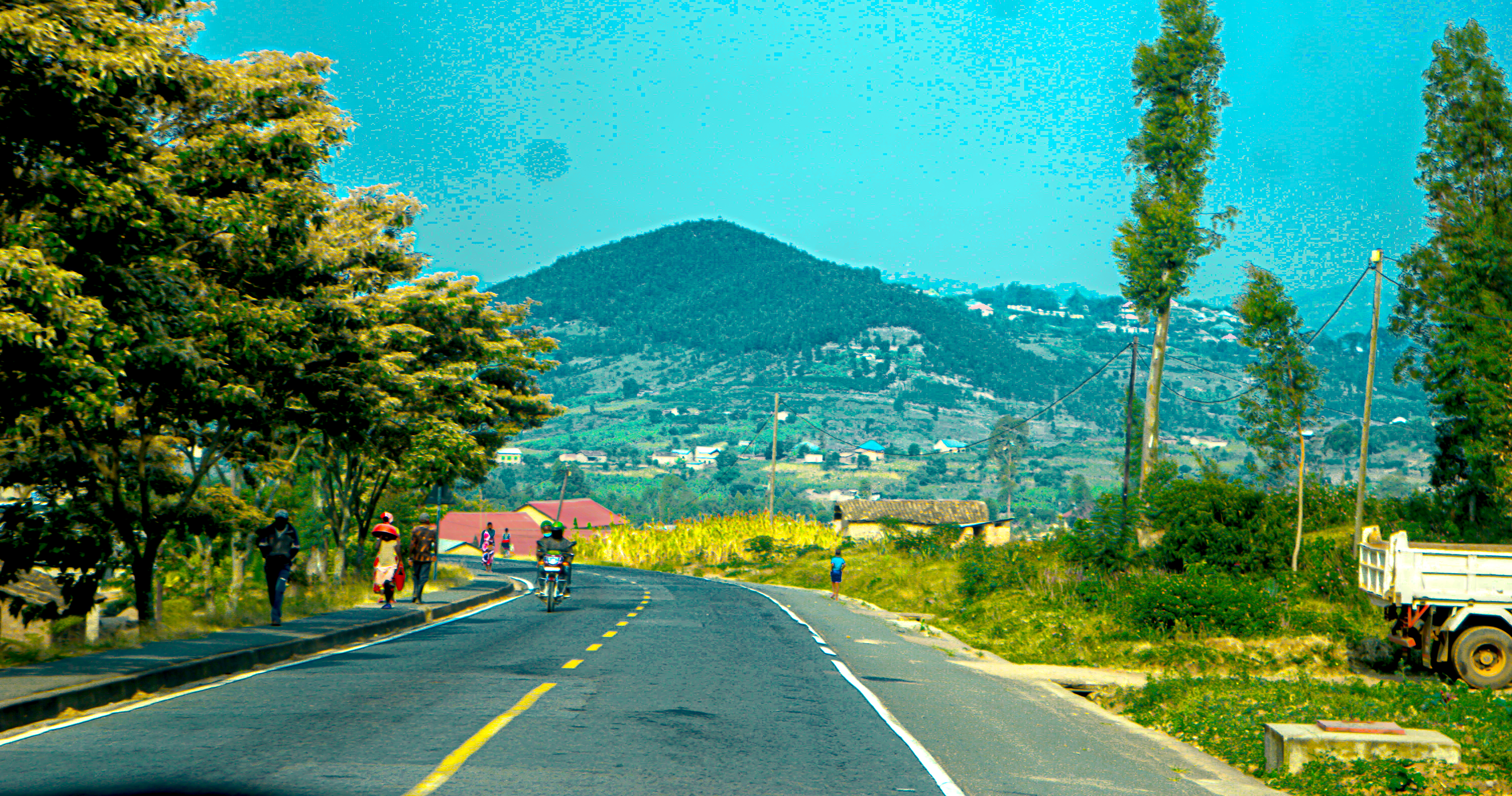
- Panoramic view of Kibeho at Nyaruguru District

- Location in Rwanda
- Coordinates: 2°38′S 29°33′E
- Country: Rwanda
- Admin. Province: Southern Province
- District: Nyaruguru

Area
  - Sector and town: 78.54 km^{2} (30.32 sq mi)

Population (2022 census)
  - Sector and town: 25,885
  - Density: 329.6/km^{2} (853.6/sq mi)
  - Urban: 7,641

Kibeho is a sector and small town in south Rwanda, which became known outside of that country because of reported apparitions of the Blessed Virgin Mary and Jesus Christ occurring between 1981 and 1989. It is also known for the Kibeho Massacre in April 1995, when several thousand internally displaced people were killed by the Rwandan Patriotic Army.

== History ==
=== Marian apparitions ===
The Blessed Virgin Mary reportedly appeared to Alphonsine Mumureke, Nathalie Mukamazimpaka and Marie-Claire Mukangango in Kibeho in 1981, as Our Lady of Sorrows. These apparitions were accompanied by intense reactions: crying, tremors, and comas.

On 19 August 1982, those who saw the visions reported gruesome sights (rivers of blood, sliced heads, etc.) which some today regard as an ominous foreshadowing of the Rwandan genocide of 1994, and particularly in that specific location in 1994 (Tutsi killed) and 1995 (Hutu killed).

Catholic Bishop Augustin Misago of Gikongoro, Rwanda approved public devotion linked to the apparitions on 15 August 1988 and declared their authenticity on 29 June 2001. In his declaration, the bishop singled out visions of the Virgin Mary by the three original visionaries as worthy of belief; but declined to declare as worthy of belief the purported visions of Jesus by four other visionaries due to "disquieting personal situations" in that case.

=== Rwandan genocide ===
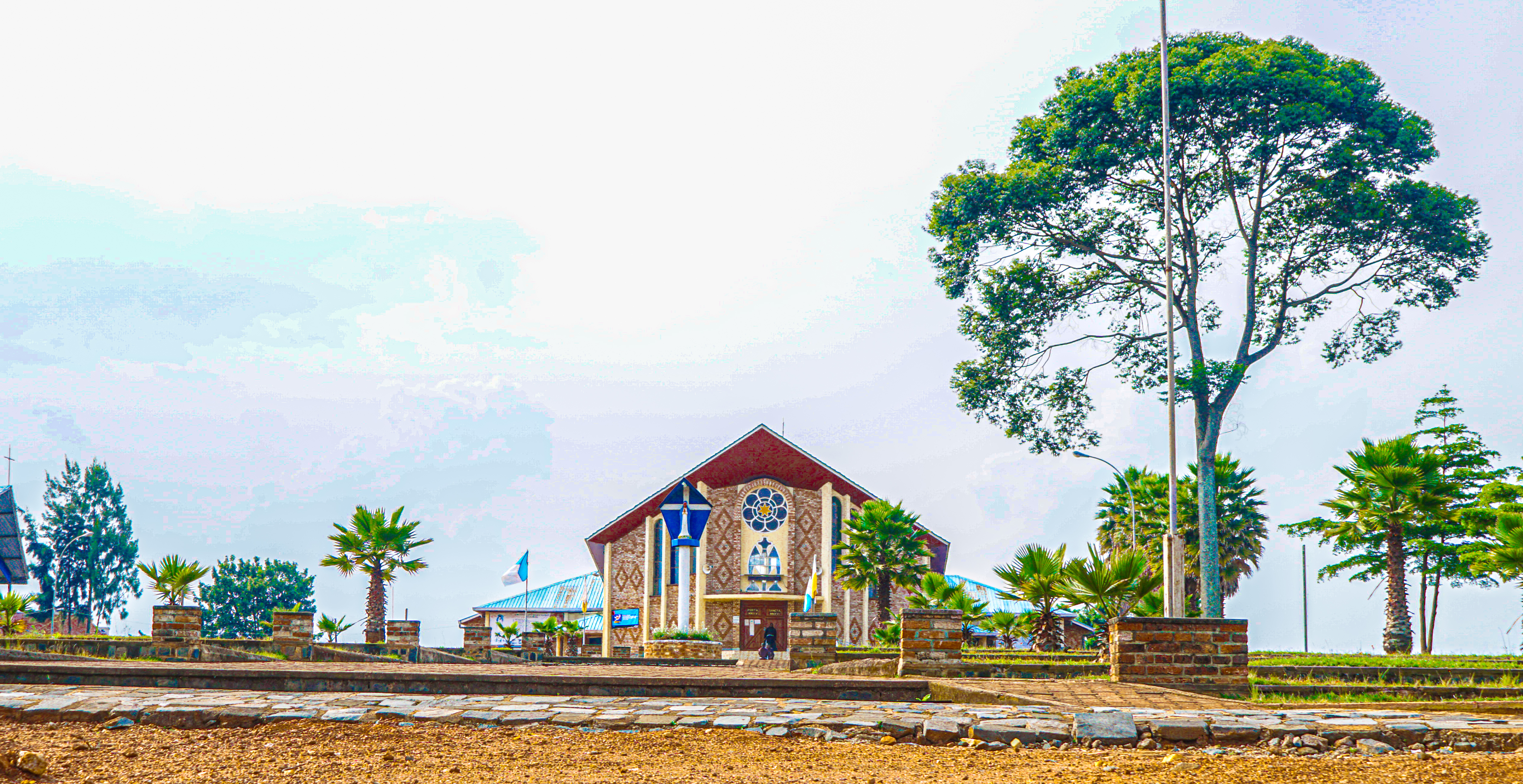
The shrine of Kibeho Marian apparitions

Kibeho church was the site of one of the early massacres of the Rwandan genocide; it is estimated that around 17,500 people were killed.

=== Kibeho massacre ===
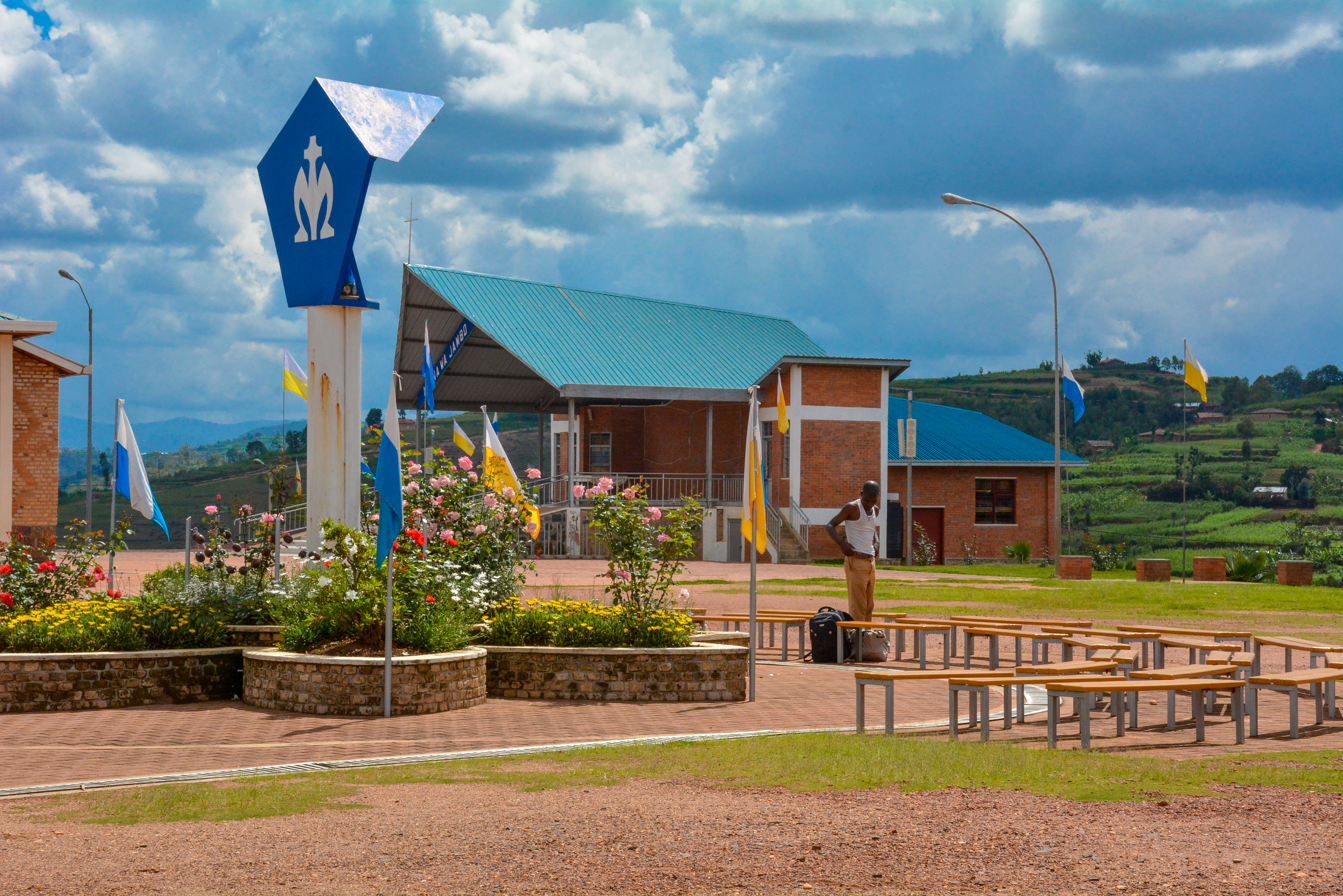
Sanctuary of Our Lady of Kibeho

After the 1994 genocide, in which the Hutu killed an estimated 5,000–6,000 Tutsi in Kibeho, it became the site of an internally displaced person refugee camp, with many of the Hutu refugees suspected of having participated in the genocide. The camp was the largest in Rwanda, spreading 9 km^{2} (3.5 sq mi) and containing between 80,000 and 100,000 people. In mid-April 1995, elements of the Tutsi, led Rwandan Patriotic Army (RPA), announced they would close the camp, with the aim of forcibly separating known Génocidaires from those who would be sent home. As the camp was closed, tensions mounted and RPA troops opened fire on some of the remaining refugees.

There were no foreign troops or reporters in Kibeho in 1994. Photographer Sebastião Salgado visited the camp in the early months of 1995 and published around ten pictures in his book Migrations.

Australian and Zambian troops of the United Nations Assistance Mission for Rwanda (UNAMIR) and staff from International Aid Agencies witnessed the massacre.

Many of these were killed in the same school in which the apparitions had occurred; one of the children who reported the vision was even one of the victims. The local bishop recognized officially on 29 June 2001 three cases as authentic. The church Notre-Dame des Douleurs (Our Lady of Sorrows) was built in Kibeho, supported by Pallottines.

== See also ==
- Kibeho massacre
