= Nyaruguru District =

Coordinates: 2°42′S 29°31′E

- District
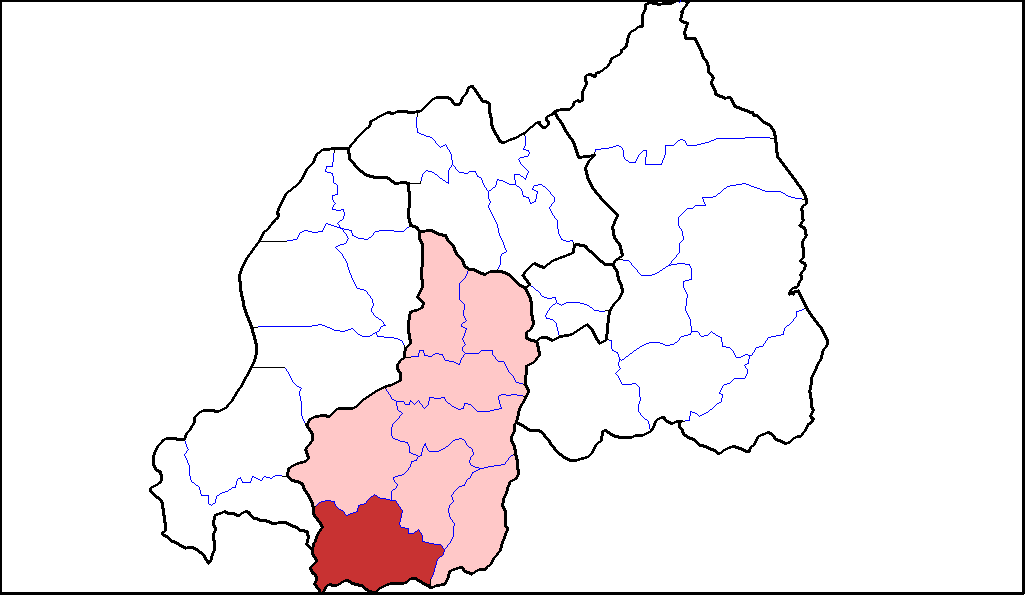
- Shown within Southern Province and Rwanda
- Country: Rwanda
- Province: Southern
- Capital: Kibeho

Area
  - District: 1,012 km^{2} (391 sq mi)

Population (2022 census)
  - District: 318,126
  - Density: 314.4/km^{2} (814.2/sq mi)
  - Urban: 7,641
  - Rural: 310,485

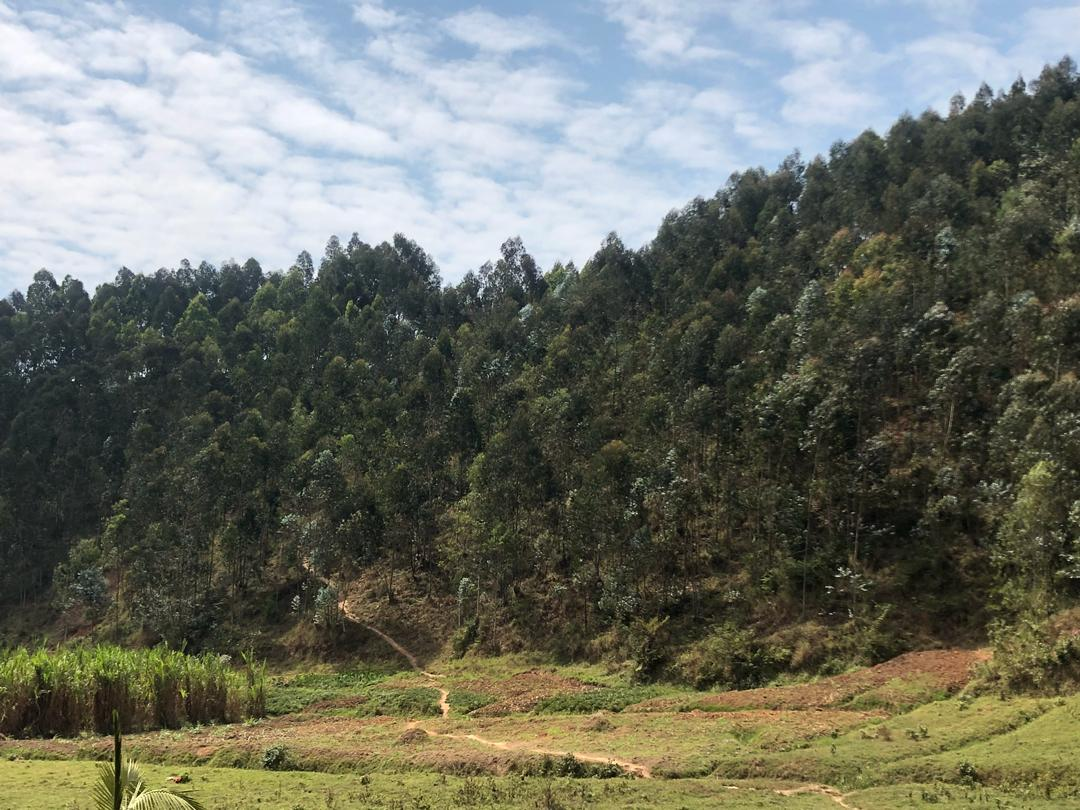
Ishyamba rihereye muri Nyaruguru forest

Nyaruguru is a district (akarere) in Southern Province, Rwanda. Its capital is Kibeho, a pilgrimage site of the Catholic Church.

== Geography ==
The district is the most southerly in Rwanda, lying between the cities of Butare and Cyangugu and along the Burundian border. It is mountainous, containing part of the montane forest of Nyungwe, one of Rwanda's most popular tourist destinations, which also provides cooking charcoal for much of the Southern region. This is one of the last remaining forest areas of Rwanda and home to chimpanzees and many other species of primate.

== Sectors ==
Nyaruguru district is divided into 14 sectors (imirenge): Cyahinda, Busanze, Kibeho, Mata, Munini, Kivu, Ngera, Ngoma, Nyabimata, Nyagisozi, Muganza, Ruheru, Ruramba and Rusenge.

== Sources ==
- "Districts of Rwanda". Statoids.
- Inzego.doc — Province, District and Sector information from MINALOC, the Rwanda ministry of local government.
