= Gérard Prunier =

French academic

Gérard Prunier (born 14 October 1942 in Paris ) is a French academic, historian, and consultant. He specializes in African history and affairs —particularly the Horn of Africa and the African Great Lakes regions.

== Biography ==
Prunier received a PhD in African History in 1981 from the University of Paris, spending a year at Harvard University and a stay in Caracas, Venezuela. In 1984, he joined the CNRS scientific institution in Paris as a researcher. He later also became Director of the French Centre for Ethiopian Studies in Addis Ababa.

Prunier has published over 120 articles and five books. He is fluent in his native French, as well as English and Spanish. He also has good knowledge of Italian and German, and a basic knowledge of Juba Arabic (South Sudanese colloquial Arabic) and Swahili.

== Published works ==
Books

- (in French) Les Ethnies ont une histoire (ed. with Jean-Pierre Chrétien), Paris : Karthala, 1989, ISBN 2-86537-226-X
- (in French) L'Ouganda et la question indienne : 1896-1972, Paris : Editions Recherche sur les civilisations, 1990
- The Rwanda Crisis: History of a Genocide, Columbia University Press, 1995, ISBN 0-231-10408-1
- (in French) Le Kenya contemporain, (ed. with François Grignon), Paris : Karthala & Nairobi : IFRA, 1998, ISBN 2-86537-793-8
- Darfur: The Ambiguous Genocide, Cornell University Press, 2005, ISBN 0-8014-4450-0
- (in French) L'Éthiopie contemporaine (director), CFEE-Karthala, Addis Abeba and Paris, 2007, ISBN 978-2-84586-736-9
  with Ficquet, Éloi. Understanding contemporary Ethiopia, L.: Oxford University Press, 2015 — english edition
- From Genocide to Continental War: The 'Congolese' Conflict and the Crisis of Contemporary Africa, C. Hurst & Co., 2009, ISBN 1-85065-523-5
  Published in the US as Africa’s World War: Congo, the Rwandan Genocide, and the Making of Continental Catastrophe, Oxford University Press, 2009, ISBN 978-0-19-537420-9
- (in French) Urgence Darfour with Morad El Hattab (direction), André Glucksmann, Bernard Kouchner, Bernard-Henri Lévy, Julliard Jacques, Jacky Mamou, Rossin Richard, Philippe Val, Paris: Des idées & des hommes, 2007
- The Country That Does Not Exist: A History of Somaliland — New York: Oxford University Press, 2021
- Colonialism Devours Itself: The Waning of Françafrique — Hurst Publishers, 2024, ISBN 9781911723653

Articles

- "Burundi: A Manageable Crisis?", WRITENET (UK), October 1994
- "Sudan’s regional war", Le Monde diplomatique, February 1997 (in English and French)
- "Rwanda: the Social, Political and Economic Situation", WRITENET (UK), June 1997
- "Somaliland, a forgotten country", Le Monde diplomatique, October 1997 (in English and French)
- "Uganda, nearly a miracle", Le Monde diplomatique, February 1998 (in English and French)
- "Somalia re-invents itself", Le Monde diplomatique, April 2000 (in English and French)
- "Sudan: irreconcilable differences, Le Monde diplomatique, December 2002 (in English and French)
- "Did Somebody Say Genocide?: Gérard Prunier on Darfur", Harper's Magazine, August 2006
- "Darfur's Sudan problem", OpenDemocracy.net, 15 September 2006
- The Ethio-Eritrean Conflict: An Essay in Interpretation
- Armed Movements in Sudan, Chad, CAR, Somalia Eritrea and Ethiopia
- Somalia: Civil War, Intervention and Withdrawal 1990 - 1995
- From Fatigues to Three-Piece Suits: East African Guerrillas in Power
- Why did South Sudan blow up in December 2013 and what is likely to happen as a result?
