= List of Rwandan women =

Notable women who are Rwandan

This is a list of women from Rwanda, including members of the Rwandan diaspora.

- Beatrice Cyiza is a Rwandan politician who currently serves as Director General of Environment and Climate Change at the Ministry of Environment in Rwanda.
- Jeanette Kagame
- Louise Mushikiwabo
- Rosemary Museminali
- Pauline Nyiramasuhuko
- Dr. Pascasie Nyirahabimana is a physicist and physics education researcher, as well as the Head of the Department of Mathematics, Science, and Physical Education at the University of Rwanda College of Education (UR-CE)
