= Jean De Dieu Uwihanganye =

Rwandan engineer and politician

Ambassador Jean De Dieu Uwihanganye

Minister of State for Infrastructure
- In office July 2025 – June 2026
- Appointed by: Paul Kagame
- Preceded by: Olivier Kabera

High Commissioner of Rwanda to Singapore
- In office July, 2019 – July, 2025
- Preceded by: Guillaume Kavaruganda

Minister of State for Transport in Cabinet of Rwanda
- In office 2017–2019
- Preceded by: Alexis Nzahabwanimana

Personal details
- Born: January 8, 1987 (age 39) Gatsibo, Rwanda
- Citizenship: Rwandan
- Education: National University of Rwanda; University of Manchester; Nanyang Technological University
- Occupation: Diplomat
- Profession: Engineer
- Cabinet: Cabinet of Rwanda
- Portfolio: Transport

Jean De Dieu Uwihanganye (born 8 January 1987), is a Rwandan engineer, and diplomat. In September 2026, he was appointed Principal for Emerging Markets and Business Development at Raffles Family Office, a Hong Kong-based multi-family office. He focuses on the firm’s engagement across the Africa–Asia investment corridor. He previously served as Rwanda's Minister of State for Infrastructure in 2025–2026 and High Commissioner of Rwanda to Singapore, Australia and New Zealand from 2019 to 2025, as well as Ambassador to Indonesia from 2023 to 2025. From 2017 to 2019, he served as Minister of State for Transport in the Ministry of Infrastructure (Rwanda). Before entering government, he was a director at NPD Ltd, a construction company in Rwanda.

As an Engineer by qualifications, Jean De Dieu was able to earn first class honors for both his graduate and postgraduate degrees. He completed this while pursuing a bachelor's degree in civil engineering at National University of Rwanda in Rwanda and a master's degree in construction project management at University of Manchester in England. Between January 2014 and August 2017, Jean De Dieu served as a part-time lecturer for project management courses at the University of Lay Adventists of Kigali (UNILAK).

== Early life and education ==
Jean De Dieu was born on 8 January 1987; he grew up and completed his secondary education at Petit Séminaire Rwesero in Gicumbi, Rwanda. Since 2007, Jean De Dieu attended formerly National University of Rwanda now University of Rwanda, in Rwanda, he graduated with Bachelor of Science in Civil Engineering in 2011. In 2012, Jean De Dieu enrolled in the University of Manchester in England to pursue a postgraduate degree, and he earned master's in construction project management there in 2013. Later in 2022, Jean De Dieu also enrolled in Nanyang Technological University for another postgraduate degree in Business Administration.

== Career ==
Following graduation from Petit Séminaire Rwesero in 2006, Jean De Dieu worked for a year as a mathematics, physics, and chemistry teacher at Lycée Muhura St Alexandre Sauli in Gatsibo, Rwanda. Jean De Dieu worked as a journalist at Radio Salus Rwanda, a Butare based radio station connected to the University of Rwanda, from 2007 to 2011 when he was a student at the National University of Rwanda. He was using Henri Jado as Pseudonym names while working as a journalist. Between January 2011 and August 2012, he was communication manager for GirlHub Rwanda, renamed to the Girl Effect, is a girl's life improving initiative which hosts Ni Nyampinga project in Rwanda, formed by collaboration between DFID and the Nike Foundation. He also worked for a year at Radio 10 Rwanda in Kigali between 2011 and 2012 before relocating to England to pursue postgraduate studies at University of Manchester. While in Manchester, he was project manager at Girl Impact Map, mapping tool affiliated to Girl Effect.

In 2014 after graduating with master's in construction project management, Jean De Dieu joined the NPD Ltd, Rwanda based construction firm, he served as director of construction and engineering services. In October 2015, subsequently, he was promoted to position of director of business planning and development at the same company. The role he served until his cabinet appointment as the Minister of State for transport in the Rwanda Ministry of Infrastructure in Cabinet of Rwanda in August 2017. In addition, he worked at the University of Lay Adventists of Kigali (UNILAK) as a part-time lecturer for project management courses in master's program between since 2014 until 2017.

== Politics ==
On 30 August 2017, President Paul Kagame appointed Jean De Dieu Minister of State for Transport in the Ministry of Infrastructure in the Cabinet of Rwanda. At the age of 30, he was one of the youngest members of the cabinet at the time of his appointment. He served in the position until July 2019, when he was appointed High Commissioner of Rwanda to Singapore, Australia and New Zealand, and was concurrently accredited as Ambassador to Indonesia from May 2023. During his diplomatic tenure, he also served as Dean of the African Group of Ambassadors in Singapore, representing African diplomatic missions to the Asia-Pacific business community.

In July 2025, Jean De Dieu returned to the Ministry of Infrastructure as Minister of State. During his second tenure, he was involved in reforms to Kigali's public transport system, including the introduction of a service-based contracting model for bus operators and the development of dedicated bus lanes and digital passenger-information systems. He also signed a directive requiring public institutions to ensure that at least 30% of newly procured vehicles were fully electric as part of Rwanda's clean-mobility policy. In October 2025, he presided over the inauguration of 151 kilometres of upgraded roads in the Eastern, Southern and Western provinces. He also reported on progress of the Ngoma–Ramiro Road project and participated in government activities concerning the Nyabarongo II Multipurpose Dam and renewable-energy development. In January 2026, he represented Rwanda at the announcement of a new direct air service between Muscat and Kigali. Jean De Dieu left the Ministry in 2026 following a Cabinet reshuffle.

== Recognition ==
Jean De Dieu appeared on the list of 2019 most influential young Africans by African youth Awards.

== See also ==
- Ministry of Infrastructure (Rwanda)
