= Rwamagana Solar Power Station =

Photovoltaic power station in Rwanda

Rwanda Solar Power Station
- Country: Rwanda
- Location: Rwamagana
- Coordinates: 02°01′34″S 30°22′38″E
- Status: Operational
- Construction began: 2014
- Commission date: 2015
- Owner: GigaWatt Global
- Operator: GigaWatt Global

Solar farm
- Type: Flat-panel PV

Power generation
- Nameplate capacity: 8.5 MW

Rwamagana Solar Power Station is an 8.5MW solar power plant in Rwanda, the fourth-largest economy in the East African Community.

== Location ==
The power station is located on leased land, at the campus of Agahozo Shalom Youth Village, in Rwamagana District, Eastern Rwanda, approximately 58 kilometres (36 mi), by road, southeast of Kigali, the capital and largest city in the country. The coordinates of the power station are:2°01'34.0"S, 30°22'38.0"E (Latitude:-2.026111; Longitude:30.377222).

== Overview ==
In July 2013, the government of Rwanda contracted with GigaWatt Global, a Dutch firm, to develop an 8.5 Megawatt solar power plant in Rwamagana District, Eastern Province, for a contract price of US$23 million (RwF:15 billion). GigaWatt Global would finance, build, own and operate the facility for 25 years, with the power produced sold to Rwanda Energy, the national electricity utility.

In February 2014, GigaWatt Global was able to reach financial closure, allowing construction to begin. Interconnection to the national electricity grid was achieved in July 2014, and by September 2014, the power plant was producing at maximum capacity. The power station consists of 28,360 individual photovoltaic panels spread out on a 50 acres (20 ha) field. The final construction price, including the cost to access the national grid came to US$23.7 million. Funding came from multiple sources, including (a) Netherlands Development Finance Company (b) Emerging Africa Infrastructure Fund and (c) Norfund. The United States Overseas Private Investment Corporation and Finland's Energy and Environment Partnership provided grants.

== See also ==
- Rwandan Power Stations
- Energy in Rwanda
- Economy of Rwanda
