= EARP Rwanda =

Electricity Access Rollout Program (EARP)
- Company type: Program
- Industry: Electricity Access and distribution
- Founded: 2009
- Headquarters: Kigali, Rwanda
- Key people: Reuben Ahimbisibwe; Ag.Program Coordinator
- Products: Electricity

EARP, also known as Electricity Access Rollout Program, is a Rwandan Government Program initiated in 2009 to synergise efforts to realize the country's targets for electricity access.

== History ==
EARP was initiated in 2009, when the Government of Rwanda wanted to bring together all Development partners contribution in the energy sector, especially to increase the access rate in the Rwandan community. At that time, only 6% of Rwandan households were accessing on-grid electricity.

So far, remarkable strides have been made by this programme under which access to the grid has increased from 364,000 households in June 2012 to more than 1,000,000 households (38.5% of the total households in Rwanda) in 2019.

EARP mission goes in line with the Rwandan Government rural electrification policy which has set 100% access target by the year 2024 in Rwanda households and 100% of centers expected to boost the economic development commonly named "Productive use areas" by 2022.

== Electricity Access in Rwanda ==
As of June 2021, the cumulative connectivity rate was 65% of Rwandan households including 47.2% connected to the national grid and 17.8% accessing through off-grid systems (mainly solar).

During the elaboration of the Economic Development targets, the Government of Rwanda took a decision to diversify the sources of electricity from traditional dominant grid to include even off-grid connections. Subsequently, Households far away from the planned national grid coverage have been encouraged to use alternatively cheaper connections such as Mini-grids and Solar Photovoltaics (PVs) to reduce the cost of access to electricity whilst relieving constraints on historical government subsidies.

== See also ==
- Rwanda Energy Group Limited
- Energy in Rwanda
- List of power stations in Rwanda
