= Olivier Kabera =

Rwandan engineer and public servant (born 1979)

Minister of State in the Ministry of Infrastructure
- In office June, 2024 – July, 2025
- Appointed by: Paul Kagame
- Preceded by: Patricie Uwase
- Succeeded by: Jean De Dieu Uwihanganye

Personal details
- Born: 1979 (age 46–47)
- Children: 2
- Education: University of Rwanda; University of Stirling
- Occupation: Public servant
- Profession: Engineer
- Cabinet: Cabinet of Rwanda
- Portfolio: Civil engineering

Olivier Kabera is a Rwandan engineer and public servant. He served as Minister of State in the Ministry of Infrastructure in the Government of Rwanda from June 2024 to July 2025. He previously held senior roles in Rwanda’s public infrastructure institutions and private construction firms. Kabera began his career in urban planning with the City of Kigali in 2004 and later worked in monitoring and evaluation roles within the Ministry of Finance and Economic Planning and the Ministry of Infrastructure on infrastructure programs. In 2010, he joined the Rwanda Transport Development Agency (RTDA). In 2017, Kabera became Managing Director at REAL Contractors Ltd and later held same position at Macefield Ventures Ltd in 2022 and NPD Ltd in 2024 before his appointment to the cabinet of Rwanda.

== Education ==
Kabera earned a Bachelor of Science in Civil Engineering and Environmental Technology from the University of Rwanda in 2004. He later completed a Master’s degree in Environmental Management at the University of Stirling in the United Kingdom in 2012.

== Career ==
In 2004, Kabera began his career in urban planning with the City of Kigali. He was subsequently appointed Assistant to the Mayor of Kigali in charge of Urban Planning until December 2005. He contributed to preliminary studies for the Kigali City Master Plan. Since April 2006, Kabera served as Director of Land, Urban Planning, Housing and Infrastructure in Nyarugenge District.

Between 2007 and 2010, Kabera served in roles of Monitoring and Evaluation Specialistat at Central Public Investment and External Finance under the Rwanda Ministry of Finance and Economic Planning and the Ministry of Infrastructure, he was working on public transport and infrastructure programs funded by the World Bank.

In 2010, Kabera joined the Rwanda Transport Development Agency (RTDA). Between 2013 to 2017, Kabera was Coordinator of the Single Project Implementation Unit at RTDA overseeing the management of national transport development projects.

In 2017, he was appointed Managing Director of REAL Contractors Ltd, a construction company in Rwanda. During his tenure, he led the construction of Nyarutarama Plaza, completed in 2020 and described as Kigali's first certified green commercial building. In 2022, he become Country Managing Director of Macefield Ventures Ltd in the Central African Republic. In January 2024 to June 2024, he served as Managing Director of NPD Ltd, a civil engineering and construction company in Rwanda.

In June 2024, Kabera was appointed Minister of State in the Ministry of Infrastructure by President Paul Kagame. During his tenure, Kabera contributed to ongoing national infrastructure projects, including the Volcano Belt Water Supply System and the Nyabarongo II Multipurpose Dam. He also announced the commencement of the Kigali–Muhanga road expansion project. He served until July 2025.
