= Aimé Kalimunda =

Rwandan judge

Aimé Muyoboke Karimunda is a Rwandan senior judge and academic currently seconded to the Institute of Legal Practice and Development (ILPD) as Rector. He is the first judge to serve as the Rector of the Institute (www.ilpd.ac.rw) that is entrusted with capacity building within the Justice Sector and legal research. He is the Vice President of Judicial Education Committee and a member of the High Council of the Prosecution seating on its Disciplinary Committee. He seats also on the National Advisory Board for Alternative Dispute Resolutions (ADR). He was appointed to the Supreme Court on 28 April 2021 by President Paul Kagame and was instrumental in several constitutional petitions and cases related to serious miscarriage of justice.

He earned a PhD from the Irish Centre for Human Rights (National University of Ireland, Galway) in 2011. His thesis was titled “The Death Penalty in Africa, The Path Towards Abolition” and was published by Ashgate in 2014. He has published articles and book chapters in the area of international criminal law and human rights. His latest publication in the Rwanda Law Journal is on “ Abolition of the Death Penalty in Rwanda: A case of Post-Genocide Rebuilding” (December 2025). Prior to his appointment to the Supreme Court, he served as the first president of Court of Appeal of Rwanda and previously served as an advisor to the deputy Chief Justice of Rwanda and senior lectured of economic and financial crimes, international criminal law and principles of criminal law at the University of Rwanda. François Rukundakuvuga succeeded him at the Court of Appeal.
