= Gisagara Thermal Power Station =

Power station in Southern, Rwanda

- Country: Rwanda
- Location: Gisagara District, Southern Province
- Coordinates: 02°17′57″S 29°57′14″E
- Status: Under construction
- Construction began: 2017
- Commission date: 2021 (Expected)
- Construction cost: US$350 million
- Owners: Hakan Mining and Generation Industry & Trade Inc.
- Operator: HQ Power Rwanda

Thermal power station
- Primary fuel: Peat

Power generation
- Nameplate capacity: 80 MW (110,000 hp)

Gisagara Thermal Power Station is an 80 megawatts (110,000 hp), peat-fired thermal power plant, under construction in Gisagara District, in the Southern Province of Rwanda.

== Location ==
The power station is located in Akanyaru Village, Gisagara District, Southern Province, approximately 75 kilometres (47 mi), by road, southwest of the city of Kigali, the capital and largest city in Rwanda.

== Overview ==
A study by Ekono Inc., an American company, found that Rwanda has dry peat reserves estimated at 155 million tons, spread over 50,000 hectares (190 mi^{2}). Hakan Mining and Generation Industry & Trade Inc., a Turkish Independent Power Producer, won the rights to build an 80 MW peat power plant in Gisagara District, Southern Rwanda.

In 2016, Hakan signed a power purchase agreement (PPA) with the government of Rwanda to design, finance, build, own and operate the plant using peat extracted from Akanyaru in Gisagara District. Rwanda would in turn buy the power generated and integrate it into the national electricity grid.

The 80 megawatts (107,282 hp) Gisagara Peat Power Plant will complement the 15 megawatts (20,115 hp) Gishoma Thermal Power Station, which came online in 2017.

== Budget and timetable ==
Hakan will finance the estimated US$400 million (Rwf300 billion) project. Construction began in 2017 and completion was expected in 2020. Other credible sources have put the construction budget at US$350 million.

In August 2020, Rwandan print media reported that overall progress of development of the power station was estimated at 96.7 percent, with completion anticipated in April 2021. In January 2021 Taarifa Rwanda, an online publication, indicated that the power station was expected to come online in February 2021. The cost of the development is reported as US$350 million.

== Developers ==
The power station was developed and is currently owned by a consortium comprising (a) Hakan AS, a Turkish solid fuel company (coal, peat etc.) (b) Quantum Power, an International power company and (c) Themis, a project development company. The consortium has developed a special purpose vehicle (SPV) company, HQ Power Rwanda. The owner developers have signed a power purchase agreement to construct, operate, maintain and own the power station for 26 years from date of commissioning and to sell the electricity generated to the Rwandan electricity utility company. Ownership of the power plant will then revert to the Government of Rwanda.

== Funding ==
As of January 2021, the funding for this project included the following:

Funding of Gisagara Thermal Power Station
Rank	Name of Lender	Amount Loaned (US$m)	% of total
1	Africa Finance Corporation	75.0	21.43
2	Finnfund	35.0	10.00
3	Trade and Development Bank		
4	Exim Bank of India		
5	African Export–Import Bank		
6	Rwanda Development Bank		
	Total	350.00	100.00

== See also ==
- List of power stations in Rwanda
