= Ruzizi IV Hydroelectric Power Station =

Proposed hydropower plant in Rwanda

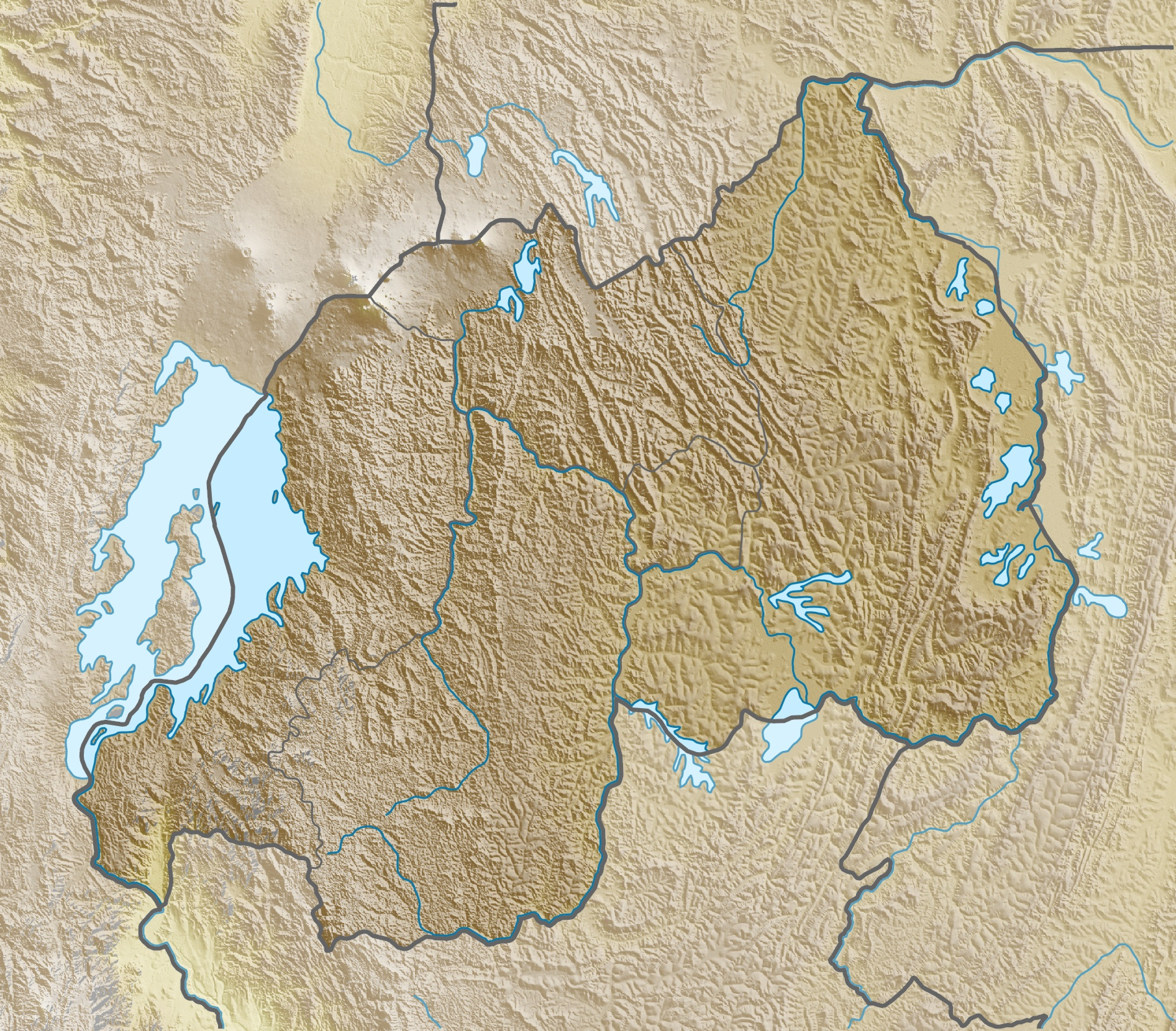
- Map of Rwanda showing the location of Ruzizi IV Hydroelectric Power Station
- Coordinates: 02°42′04″S 28°58′12″E
- Status: Proposed

Dam and spillways
- Impounds: Ruzizi River

Power Station
- Commission date: 2030 (expected)
- Type: Run-of-the-river
- Installed capacity: 287 MW (385,000 hp)

Ruzizi IV Hydroelectric Power Station, is a proposed hydro-power plant, with planned capacity installation of 287 megawatts (385,000 hp) when completed.

== Location ==
The power station is located on Ruzizi River, straddling the common border between Rwanda and the Democratic Republic of the Congo (DC). Its location is approximately 5 kilometres (3 mi), as the crow flies, west of the town of Bugarama, in Rusizi District, in Rwanda's Western Province, approximately 252 kilometres (157 mi), southwest of Kigali, the capital city of that country. Ruzizi IV, lies in proximity to three other hydroelectric power stations along River Ruzizi, namely Rizizi I, II and III.

== Overview ==
This power station is the fourth in a cascade of power stations on the Ruzizi River, benefiting the countries of Burundi, DRC and Rwanda. The power stations include Ruzizi I (29.8 megawatts) and Ruzizi II (43.8 megawatts), both located northwest of Ruzizi III and both operational as of January 2020. Ruzizi III Hydroelectric Power Station is a 147 megawatts hydroelectricity power station under development since the early 2010s. The power generated from these power stations is shared equally between the three neighboring countries.

== Funding ==
In January 2020, the African Development Bank approved a grant of €8 million towards the preparation of this project. This follows another grant of US$980,000 approved in late 2018 by the Partnership for Africa Development's Infrastructure Project Preparation Facility (NEPAD-IPPF), towards the same goal.

== See also ==
- Rwanda Power Stations
- Africa Power Dams
- World Power Dams
