= Rukarara Hydroelectric Power Station =

Dam in Rukarara, Nyamagabe, Rwanda

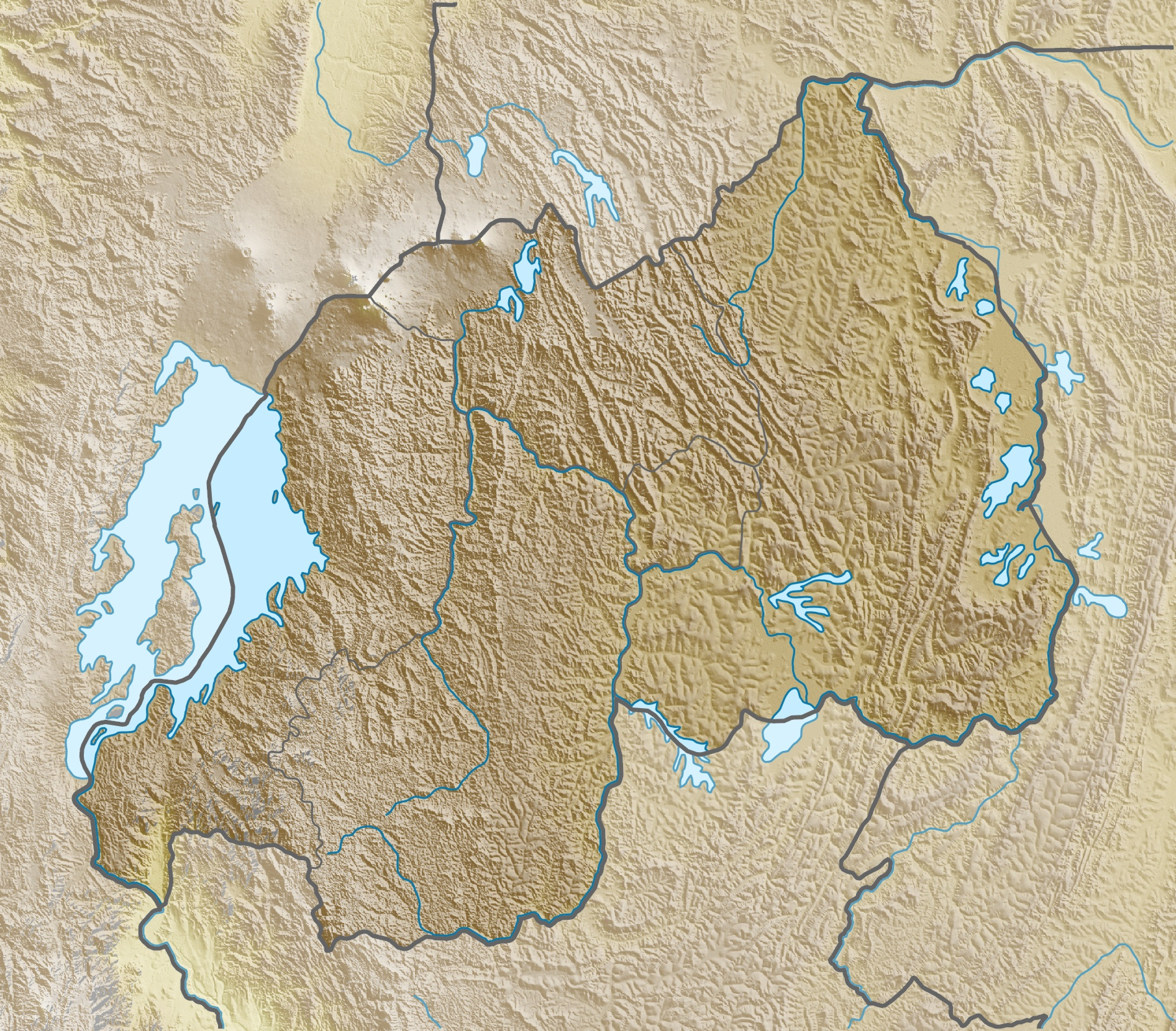
- Map of Rwanda showing the location of Rukarara Hydroelectric Power Station
- Interactive map of Rukarara Hydroelectric Power Station
- Country: Rwanda
- Location: Rukarara; Nyamagabe District
- Coordinates: 02°28′06″S 29°33′12″E
- Status: Operational
- Opening date: 2011

Dam and spillways
- Type of dam: Run of river
- Impounds: River Rukarara
- Spillway type: Straight Drop Spillway

Reservoir
- Normal elevation: 1,550 m (5,090 ft)

Power Station
- Coordinates: 2.440982°S 29.495778°E
- Commission date: 2010
- Type: Run-of-the-river
- Hydraulic head: 136m
- Turbines: Francis
- Installed capacity: 9.5 MW (12,700 hp)

Rukarara Hydroelectric Power Station is a 9.5 MW (12,700 hp) hydroelectric power station in Rwanda.

== Location ==
The power station is located on the Rukarara River, in Nyamagabe District, in the Southern Province of Rwanda, approximately 182 kilometres (113 mi) southwest of Kigali, the capital and largest city in the country.

== Overview ==
The 9.6 MW power plant was constructed in several stages. The first stage, with capacity of 6.9 MW, completed in 2011. The second stage, with capacity of 2.2 MW was completed in 2014. The construction costs for the entire power station was US$13.12 million, with funding provided by the government of Rwanda, the European Union and the Belgian Development Agency.

== Other considerations ==
The power generated is evacuated via a new sub-station at Rukarara and via a new high voltage power line from Rukarara to Kirinda.

== See also ==
- List of power stations in Rwanda
- List of hydroelectric power stations in Africa
- List of hydroelectric power stations
