= Ministry of Infrastructure (Rwanda) =

Government ministry of Rwanda

- Minisiteri y'Ibikorwaremezo; Ministère des Infrastructures
- Emblem of Rwanda

Agency overview
- Formed: 1962
- Jurisdiction: Government of Rwanda
- Headquarters: Kimihurura, Kigali
- Minister responsible: Damien Murwanashyaka, Minister of Infrastructure
- Deputy Ministers responsible: Armand Zingiro, Minister of State; Col. Claudien Bizimungu, Minister of State
- Agency executive: Canoth Manishimwe, Permanent Secretary
- Child agencies: Rwanda Energy Group; Rwanda Civil Aviation Authority; RwandAir
- Website: www.mininfra.gov.rw

The Ministry of Infrastructure (MININFRA) is the ministry of the Government of Rwanda in charge of infrastructure. It covers four sectors: transport, energy, water and sanitation, and housing and human settlements.

The ministry was created in 1962 and took its current name in 2002. Its headquarters are in Kimihurura, Kigali. Since June 2026, the minister has been Damien Murwanashyaka.

== History ==
The ministry was founded after independence in 1962. Its first name was Ministry for Technical Businesses. Three years later, it was renamed Ministry of Public Services. Following the military coup which brought President Juvénal Habyarimana to power, the ministry was renamed again to the Ministry of Public Services and Energy. It retained this name until 1980, when it was expanded to include a water remit. The Ministry of Public Services was retained after the 1994 Rwandan genocide, reverting first to its former title of Ministry of Public Services and Energy, from 1994 then back to its 1960s title of Ministry of Public Services (MINITRAP) in 1997 and to the new name of Ministry of Public Services, Transport and Communication in 1999. The Ministry gained its current name Ministry of Infrastructure in 2002.

== Role ==
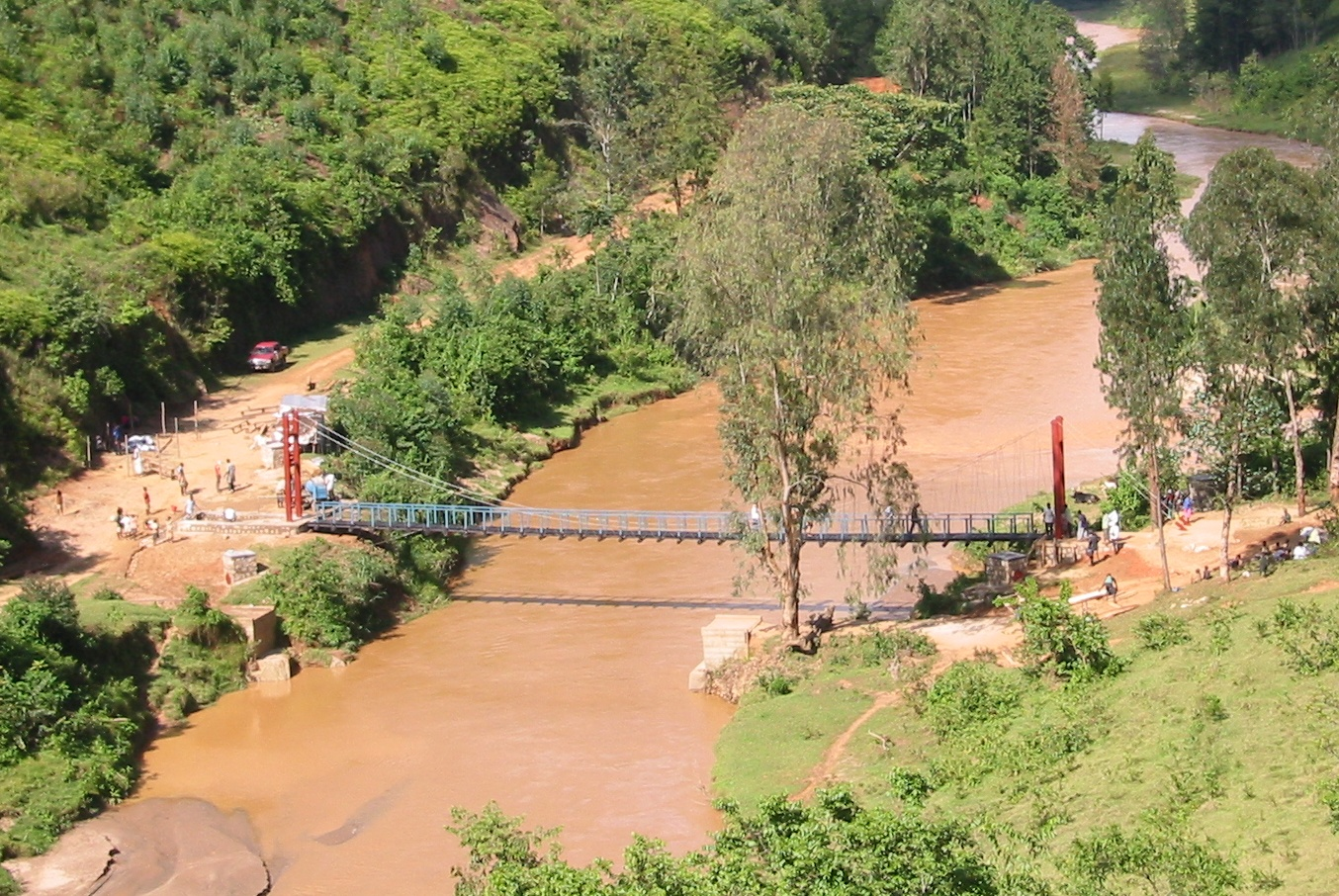
A bridge over the Nyabarongo

The ministry's mission is to deliver sustainable infrastructure in transport, energy, water and sanitation, and housing. This infrastructure supports economic growth and improves the lives of citizens. The ministry develops the national transport network, including roads, bridges, airports, railways and waterways. It also promotes power generation and affordable urban housing.

The ministry oversees several public agencies and companies:

- Road Maintenance Fund (RMF)
- Rwanda Civil Aviation Authority (RCAA)
- Rwanda Energy Group (REG)
- Water and Sanitation Corporation (WASAC)
- Rwanda Transport Development Agency (RTDA)
- Rwanda Housing Authority (RHA)
- RwandAir

== Ministers ==
- Jean-Damascène Ntawukuriryayo (2002–2004)
- Evariste Bizimana (2004–2006)
- Stanislas Kamanzi (2006–2008)
- Linda Bihire (2008–2009)
- Vincent Karega (2009–2011)
- Albert Nsengiyumva (2011 – February 2013)
- Silas Lwakabamba (February 2013 – 2014)
- James Musoni (2014–2018)
- Claver Gatete (2018–2022)
- Ernest Nsabimana (January 2022 – September 2023)
- Jimmy Gasore (September 2023 – June 2026)
- Damien Murwanashyaka (since June 2026)

=== Ministers of State ===
- Alexis Nzahabwanimana (2014–2017)
- Jean De Dieu Uwihanganye (July 2017 – July 2019)
- Patricie Uwase (February 2022 – June 2024)
- Olivier Kabera (June 2024 – July 2025)
- Jean De Dieu Uwihanganye (July 2025 – June 2026, second term)
- Armand Zingiro (since June 2026)
- Col. Claudien Bizimungu (since June 2026)
