= Angeline Rutazana =

Angeline Rutazana is a Rwandan judge currently serving as the inspector general of courts in Rwanda. She was regional representative of the Commonwealth Magistrates and Judges Association (CMJA) from 2012 to 2015.

== Education and career ==
Angeline Rutazana earned her first law degree from University of Rwanda and a master's degree from University of Ottawa. She holds several certifications including Improvement of Judicial Fairness and Efficient Judicial Administration from Seoul, (2014), International and Transnational crimes from Tanzania (2015), and Leadership in Court Governance from Singapore Judicial College (2020).

Rutazana served as president of Rwanda Judges and Registrars Association from 2012 to 2017 and was president of the East African Magistrates and Judges Association from 2017 to 2019. She was a member of the executive committee of the Commonwealth Magistrates and judges Association overseeing gender issues in Eastern, Southern and Central Region from 2012 to 2015.
