= Uwase =

Uwase is a surname. Notable people with the surname include:

- Fred Yannick Uwase (born 1994), Rwandan judoka
- Patricie Uwase (born 1989), Rwandan engineer
- Peace Uwase (born 1978), Rwandan accountant
