= Didas Kayihura Muganga =

Acting Vice Chancellor, University of Rwanda
- Appointed by: President of Republic, Rwanda
- Chancellor: Patricia L. Campbell
- Preceded by: Alexandre Lyambabaje

Personal details
- Education: Utrecht University
- Profession: Academician

Kayihura Muganga Didace is a Rwandan lawyer and academician. Since July 2022, he is serving as the Acting Vice Chancellor of the University of Rwanda.

== Education ==
Kayihura Muganga Didace studied law at the former National University of Rwanda. He has a master's degree in International Business Law from Utrecht University. In 2015, he completed a Ph.D. from Utrecht University. His Ph.D. research entitled “Corporate Governance and the liability of Corporate Directors: The case of Rwanda”.

== Career ==
Kayihura is the former Acting Principal of the University of Rwanda's College of Arts and Social Sciences (CASS). He served as Rector of the Institute for Legal Practice and Development (ILPD) from 2016 to 2017. In addition, he served as the dean of the National University of Rwanda's (UR) faculty of law (2007–2009).

In addition, Kayihura is also a business legal analyst and negotiator.
