= James McWha =

James McWha AO
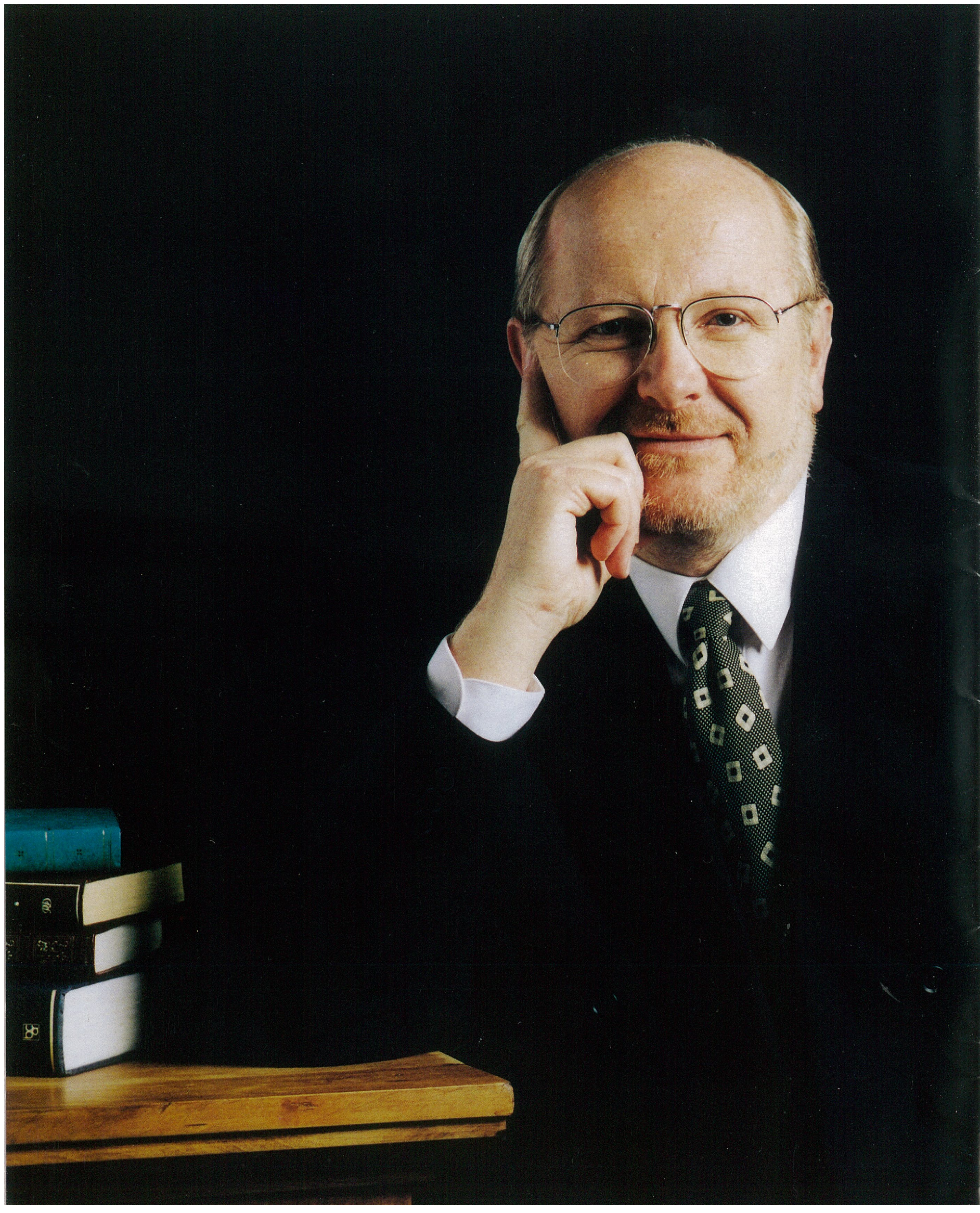
- McWha in 1996

5th Vice Chancellor of Lincoln University
- In office March 2018 – December 2018
- Chancellor: Steve Smith
- Preceded by: Robin Pollard
- Succeeded by: Bruce McKenzie

1st Vice Chancellor of the University of Rwanda
- In office October 2013 – October 2015
- Succeeded by: Philip Cotton

19th Vice-Chancellor and President of the University of Adelaide
- In office 2002–2012
- Chancellor: Robert Champion de Crespigny; Brian Croser (acting); John von Doussa; Robert Hill
- Preceded by: Mary O'Kane; Cliff Blake (interim)
- Succeeded by: Warren Bebbington

3rd Vice-Chancellor of Massey University
- In office 1995–2002
- Preceded by: Neil Waters
- Succeeded by: Judith Kinnear

Personal details
- Born: 28 May 1947 (age 79) County Down, Northern Ireland
- Scientific career
- Education: Queen's University Belfast (BS); Glasgow University (PhD)
- Fields: Botany
- Workplaces: University of Canterbury; University of Adelaide; Massey University
- Thesis: Studies on the involvement of abscisic acid in the regulation of dormancy in fruits of Lactuca sativa L (1973)
- Doctoral advisor: J R Hillman

James Alexander McWha AO (born 28 May 1947) is a botanist whose professional career was devoted to teaching, research and educational administration in New Zealand, Northern Ireland and Australia. He retired as Vice-Chancellor and President of the University of Adelaide on 30 June 2012. In October 2013 he was appointed as Vice Chancellor of the newly created University of Rwanda. He retired from the University of Rwanda in October 2015.

== Early life and family ==
McWha was born in County Down, Northern Ireland, on 28 May 1947, the son of Sarah Isabel McWha (née Caughey) and David McWha. He graduated with a BSc and BAgr (with honours in agricultural botany) from Queen's University Belfast in 1969 and 1970. McWha received his PhD in plant physiology from Glasgow University in 1973.

In 1970, McWha married Jean Lindsay Farries and, after migrating to New Zealand in 1973, the couple went on to have three children.

== Career ==
After his PhD, he took up an appointment at the University of Canterbury in New Zealand, where a period as a lecturer in the Department of Botany was followed by a term as Head of the Department of Plant and Microbial Sciences. In 1985 he returned to Northern Ireland to take up a joint appointment as Professor and Head of Agricultural Botany at Queen's University Belfast, and Deputy Chief Scientific Officer in the Northern Ireland Department of Agriculture. In 1989 he was appointed Director of DSIR Fruit and Trees in the New Zealand Department of Scientific and Industrial Research, and in 1992 became foundation Chief Executive Officer of HortResearch (the Horticulture and Food Research Institute of New Zealand Ltd). He was appointed Vice-Chancellor and President of Massey University in New Zealand in 1996, and Vice-Chancellor and President of the University of Adelaide, Australia, in 2002. In October 2013 he was appointed as Vice Chancellor of the newly created University of Rwanda. He retired from the University of Rwanda in October 2015, returning to Australia. In March 2018, McWha was appointed Vice Chancellor of Lincoln University in New Zealand, on a fixed-term contract until December 2018.

== Honours ==
McWha was recognised in 2003 by the award of the Australian Centenary Medal for his services to education.

In May 2004, he was awarded the degree of Doctor of Science (honoris causa) from Massey University in recognition of his outstanding contribution to Massey and his advocacy for New Zealand's education system.

He was made an honorary officer of the Order of Australia (AO) for services to higher education in December 2011.

Academic offices
Preceded by Neil Waters	Vice-chancellor of Massey University; 1995–2002	Succeeded by Judith Kinnear
Preceded by Cliff Blake	Vice-chancellor of the University of Adelaide; 2002–2012	Succeeded by Warren Bebbington
New office	Vice-chancellor of the University of Rwanda; 2013–2015	Succeeded by Philip Cotton
Preceded by Robin Pollard	Vice-chancellor of Lincoln University; 2018	Succeeded by Bruce McKenzie
