= Philip Cotton =

British physician and university administrator

Philip Cotton OBE FRCGP

Vice-Chancellor of University of Global Health Equity
- Incumbent
- Assumed office April 2024
- Preceded by: Joel M. Mubiligi

Vice-Chancellor of the University of Rwanda
- In office October 2015 – October 2020
- Preceded by: James McWha
- Succeeded by: Alexandre Lyambabaje

Personal details
- Born: Birmingham, England
- Citizenship: United Kingdom; Rwanda
- Education: Riddlesdown High School
- Alma mater: University of St Andrews; University of Glasgow

Philip Cotton OBE FRCGP is a British physician and university administrator who has served as the Vice-Chancellor of University of Global Health Equity since April 2023. He was previously the Vice-Chancellor of the University of Rwanda between 2015 and 2020. He is also a methodist preacher.

== Early life and education ==
Cotton was born in Birmingham, England and was educated at Riddlesdown High School in Croydon, South London. After a period of teaching English in Nepal, in 1981 he began his studies in anatomy at the University of St Andrews where he was President of the Student Voluntary Service. He completed his medical education at the University of Glasgow which involved electives abroad in India and Tanzania.

== Career ==
After working as a general practitioner for NHS Scotland and rising to the position of Professor at the University of Glasgow Medical School, Cotton took secondment to set-up and become Principal of Rwanda's first medical school, the College of Medicine and Health Sciences at the University of Rwanda. He was later promoted to become the university's Vice-Chancellor, and then became Head of the Mastercard Foundation Scholars Program before becoming the Vice-Chancellor of University of Global Health Equity in 2024.

Cotton is also a volunteer doctor for Freedom from Torture and a director of St Andrew's Clinics for Children, a Scottish-based charity aimed at supporting clinics in Africa.

== Honours ==
Cotton was appointed an Officer of the Order of the British Empire in the 2017 Birthday Honours for services to education in Rwanda. He holds honorary professorships at the Universities of St Andrews and Glasgow and was elected as an International Fellow of the Royal Society of Edinburgh in 2021.
