= Cliff Blake =

Australian agriculturalist and educationalist

Clifford Douglas (C. D.) Blake AO is an Australian agriculturalist and educationalist who became first Vice-Chancellor of Charles Sturt University, from 1990 through to 2001 and then after his retirement from CSU in July 2001, he took up an interim Vice-Chancellor position at the University of Adelaide from August 2001.

Blake was born in Muswellbrook, New South Wales in 1937. He studied at the University of Sydney and at Rothamsted Experimental Station in England, where he earned a PhD from the University of London.

After completing a Rockefeller Travelling Fellowship in the United States, where he visited centres of biological teaching and research, Blake became a lecturer in plant pathology at The University of Sydney and the Wilson Fellow and Senior Tutor at St Andrew's College.

In 1971 he was appointed Principal of the new Riverina College of Advanced Education, which he developed into one of the leading providers of distance education courses in Australia, introducing courses in business, liberal studies, and science. After amalgamating with the Wagga Agricultural College, he was able to introduce courses in agriculture and relocated the College to a new greenfield site north of the city. In 1981, he oversaw the amalgamation of the College with the Goulburn College of Advanced Education to become the Riverina-Murray Institute of Higher Education.

He was also a member of the Board of Adult Education in New South Wales, a member of the Advanced Education Council of the Commonwealth Tertiary Education Commission and the Chairman of the NSW Advanced Education Conference. In 1988 he was made a member of the Order of Australia and later appointed the first Vice-Chancellor of Charles Sturt University.

He was elected a Fellow of the Australian Institute of Agricultural Science and awarded the Farrer Memorial Medal in 1996 for his contributions to agricultural science.

Academic offices
Preceded by Mary O'Kane	Vice-Chancellor of the University of Adelaide; 2001–2002	Succeeded by James McWha
New title	Vice-Chancellor of the Charles Sturt University; 1990–2001	Succeeded by Ian Goulter
