= Alexandre Lyambabaje =

Rwandan statistician and politician

Vice Chancellor

Professor
- Appointed by: Cabinet Meeting, Rwandan Government
- Preceded by: Philip Cotton

PhD, Doctor of Philosophy

Personal details
- Born: 1960 (age 65–66) Nyanza, Rwanda
- Education: University of Rennes, University of Montreal, National University of Rwanda
- Occupation: academician, sportsman, statistician

Alexandre Lyambabaje is a Rwandan mathematician, academician and politician. From February 2021 to May 2022, Prof. Lyambabaje served as vice-chancellor of the University of Rwanda. Prior to becoming vice chancellor, Prof. Lyambabaje was the secretary of Inter University Council of East Africa. Prof. Lyambabaje has also held various governmental positions, including minister of commerce and tourism, and serving as the permanent secretary to the minister of education.

== Early life and education ==
Lyambabaje was born in 1960 in Nyanza in Southern Province of Rwanda. He obtained a bachelor's degree in mathematics at the National University of Rwanda. He continued his education in Canada where he got a master's of science in mathematical statistics from the University of Montreal. Due to his technical skills in volleyball, he received a scholarship to continue his study at the University of Rennes in France and he graduated with PhD in mathematics.

== Previous positions ==
Lyambabaje has held different top positions in the Rwanda Government. From 1999 to 2000, he was the Permanent Secretary in the Ministry of Education. From 2000 to 2003, he served as Minister of Commerce, Tourism Industry, Investments Promotion and Cooperatives. From 2014 to 2016, Lyambabaje served as a University researcher and lecturer at the University of Rwanda College of Medicine and Health Science.

Lyambabaje has served as the executive secretary of the Inter University Council of East Africa (IUCEA), a regional body that coordinates inter-university cooperation in East Africa.
