= Nyabarongo II Multipurpose Dam =

Dam in Rwanda

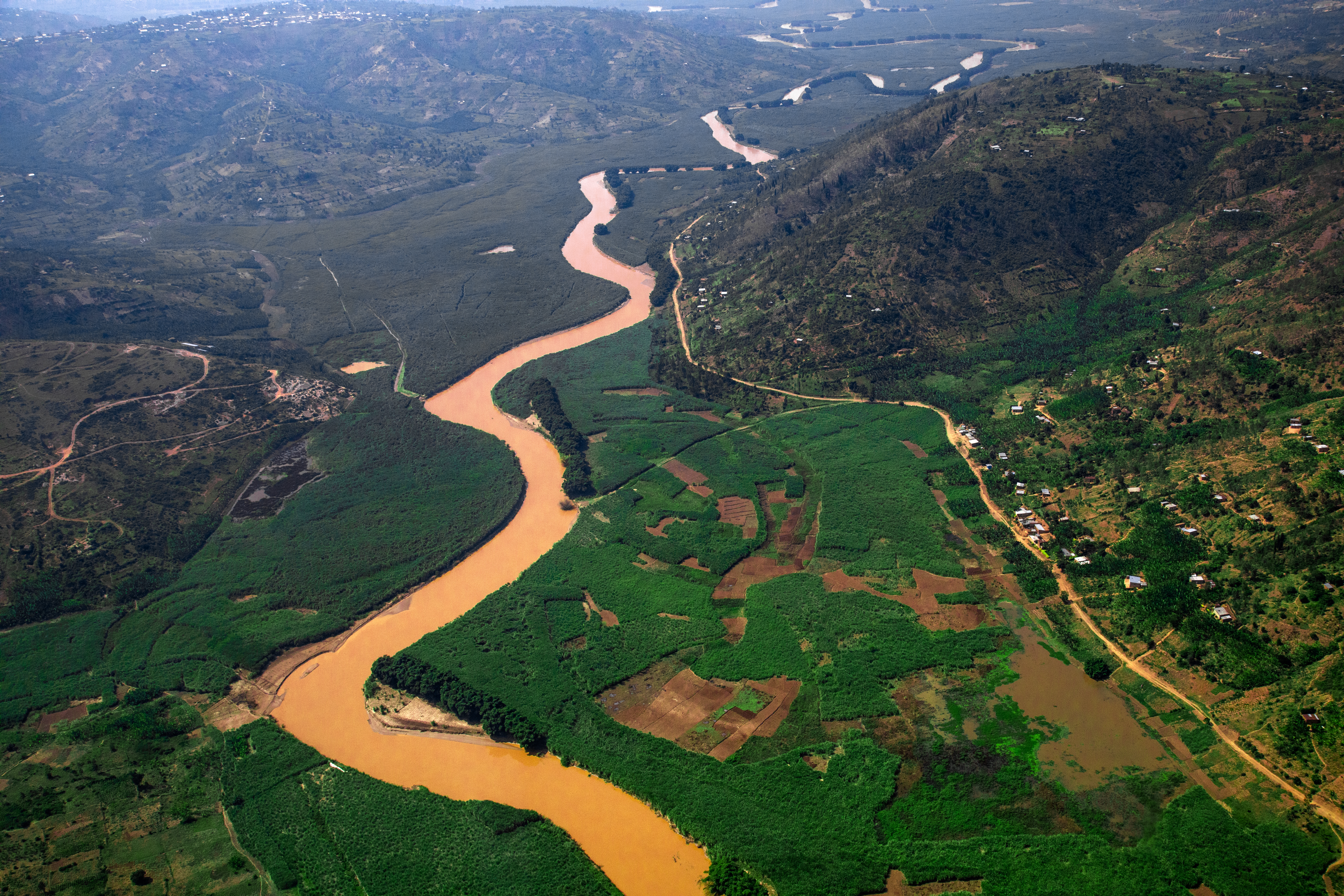

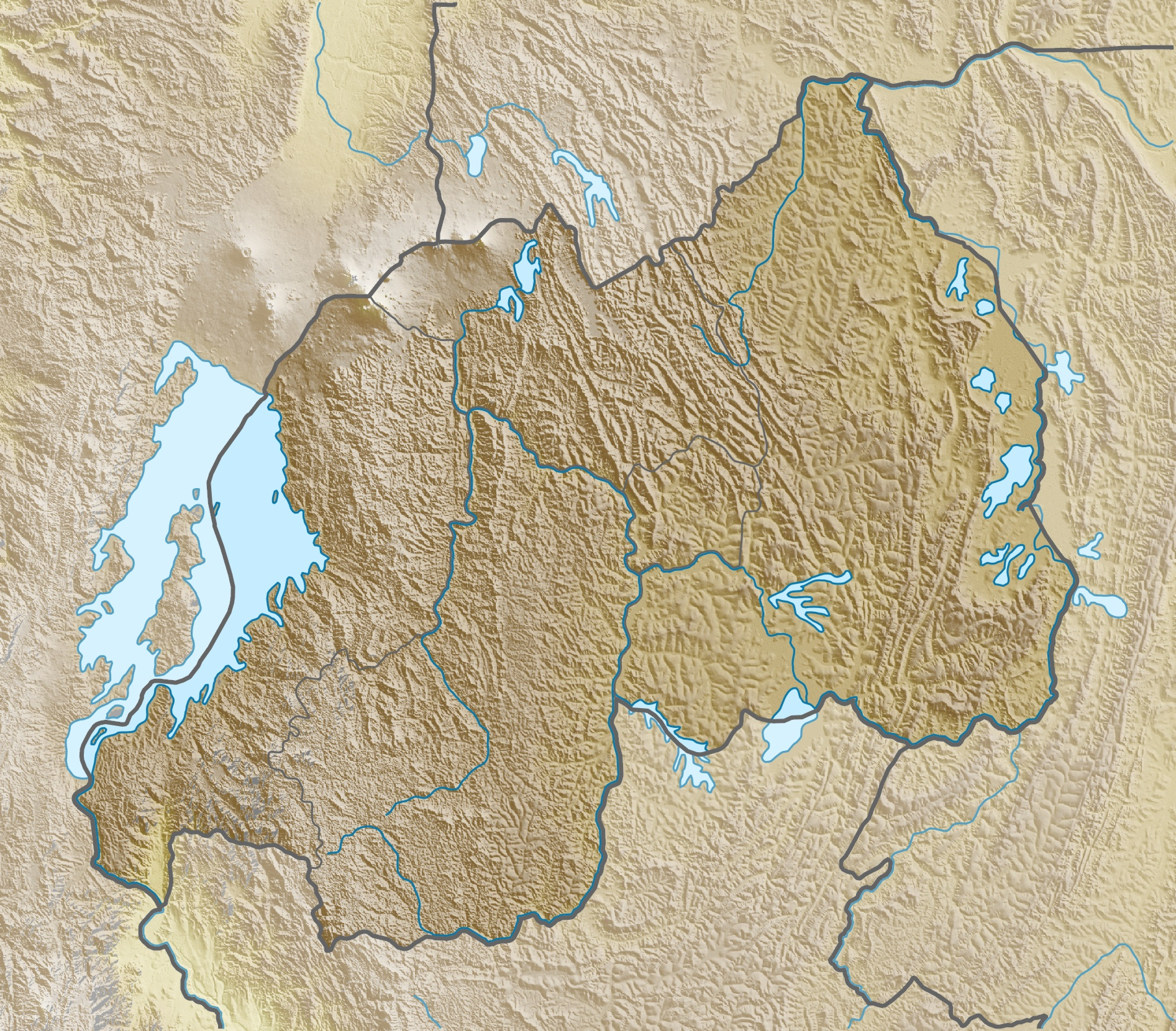
- Location of Nyabarongo II Power Station; Placement on map is approximate Nyabarongo II Multipurpose Dam (Africa) Nyabarongo II Multipurpose Dam (Earth)
- Location: Shyorongi, Rulindo District, Rwanda
- Coordinates: 01°52′36″S 29°56′25″E
- Construction began: April 2021
- Opening date: 2027
- Construction cost: US$214 million
- Owner: Rwanda Energy Group

Dam and spillways
- Type of dam: Gravity dam
- Impounds: Nyabarongo River

Power Station
- Commission date: 2025 Expected
- Turbines: 3 x 14.5 MW
- Installed capacity: 43.5 MW (58,300 hp)

The Nyabarongo II Multipurpose Dam, is a multipurpose dam under construction across the Nyabarongo River in Rwanda. The dam will measure 48 metres (157 ft) high and 228 metres (748 ft) long, creating a reservoir with storage capacity of 846,000,000 cubic meters (8.46×10^{11} L). The reservoir is also expected to provide irrigation water to an estimated 20,000 hectares (49,000 acres) of land, downstream of the dam site. In addition, the dam will host Nyabarongo II Hydroelectric Power Station, with installed generating capacity of 43.5 megawatts.

== Location ==
Nyabarongo II Dam is located near the town of Shyorongi, in Rulindo District, in the Northern Province of Rwanda. This is approximately 21 kilometres (13 mi) northwest of Kigali, the capital and largest city in that country.

== History ==
In June 2018, the government of Rwanda, through Energy Development Corporation Limited (EDCL), a subsidiary of Rwanda Energy Group (REG), agreed with Sinohydro for the latter to build this multipurpose dam to (a) store irrigation water (b) to regulate flooding downstream of this dam and (c) generate 43.5 megawatts of hydroelectric energy to add to the national grid.

In April 2019, the agreements between the parties were clarified. Sinohydro was tasked to build the dam and have the components working, no later than 2025. The building model to be used was agreed to be "build, own, operate and transfer" (BOOT). The cost of the project was budgeted at $214 million.

Nyabarongo II Power Station is intended to augment the 28 megawatts (38,000 hp) Nyabarongo I Hydroelectric Power Station, upstream of Nyabarongo II.

== Development, funding and timeline ==
The engineering, procurement, and construction contract was awarded to Sinohydro, the Chinese state-owned hydropower, engineering and construction company, at a contract price of US$214 million.

The funds were borrowed by the Government of Rwanda, from the Exim Bank of China on concessional terms.

Construction began in April 2021 and is scheduled to last until December 2026.

== Associated infrastructure ==
In addition to the dam and power station, Sinohydro is under contract to construct the following infrastructure, as part of this project: (a) a bridge across the Nyabarongo River (b) a switchyard and a 110kV substation (c) a 110kV transmission line measuring 19 kilometres (12 mi), from the power station to the substation at Rulindo, where the energy will enter the national grid and (d) a permanent road to the site of the dam. All that to be completed in 56 months.

== See also ==
- List of power stations in Rwanda
