= African Centre of Excellence in Data Science =

University of Rwanda and World Bank funded centre of excellence in data science

Coordinates: 1.9620°S 30.0748°E

- Type: Public
- Established: 2018
- Parent institution: University of Rwanda
- Accreditation: Higher Education Council, Data Science Council of America
- Location: Rwanda
- Language: English
- Website: aceds.ur.ac.rw

The African Centre of Excellence in Data Science (ACE-DS) is a Rwandan educational institution focusing on data science. It is situated at the University of Rwanda, and was established in 2018 under the funding of the World Bank's Africa Centres of Excellence II Project.

== History ==
The ACE-DS was founded as part of the World Bank's Africa Centres of Excellence (ACE) II Project, initiated in recognition of the need to strengthen selected Eastern and Southern African higher education institutions. Launched in 2018, ACE-DS is one of 24 Eastern and Southern Africa Higher Education Centers of Excellence supported by the World Bank's ACE II Project. The World Bank allocated 4.5 million dollars for the project over a period of 7 years. The primary objective of the ACE II Project is to strengthen selected higher education institutions across the region.

== Academic programs ==
ACE-DS offers Masters and PhD in data sciences, and specialisations that include Actuarial Science, Demography, Biostatistics, Econometrics, and Data Mining.

In collaboration with Data Science Council of America (DASCA), ACE-DS offers certification programs for professionals in data-related roles.
