= Patricia L. Campbell =

Patricia L. Campbell is a professor who is serving as Chancellor of University of Rwanda and served as Vice President for Operations at Tufts University and Director of Finance, Administration in WGBH Radio station and Associate Dean of Tufts University School of Dental Medicine.
