= Nyabarongo I Hydroelectric Power Station =

Power station in Rwanda

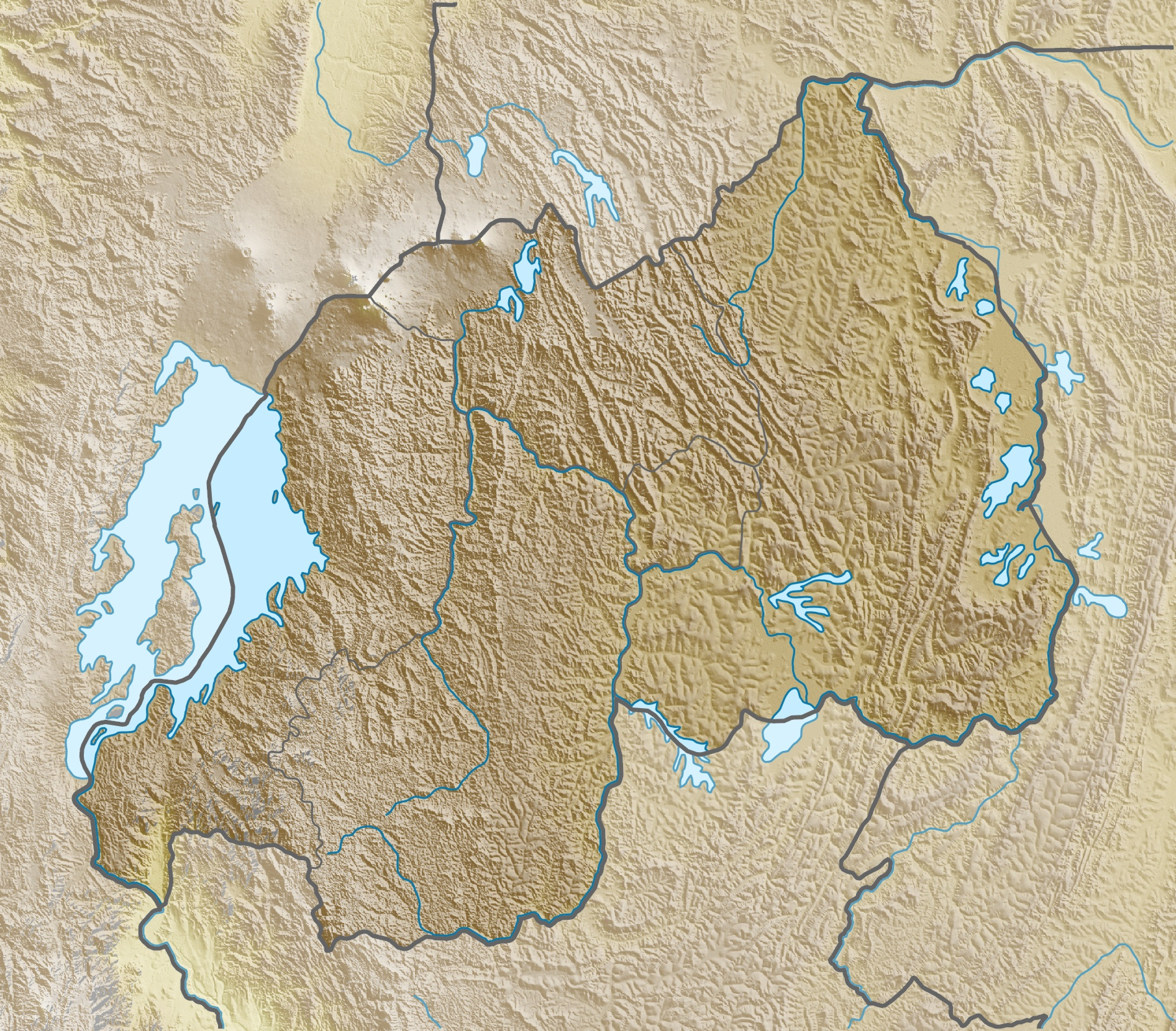

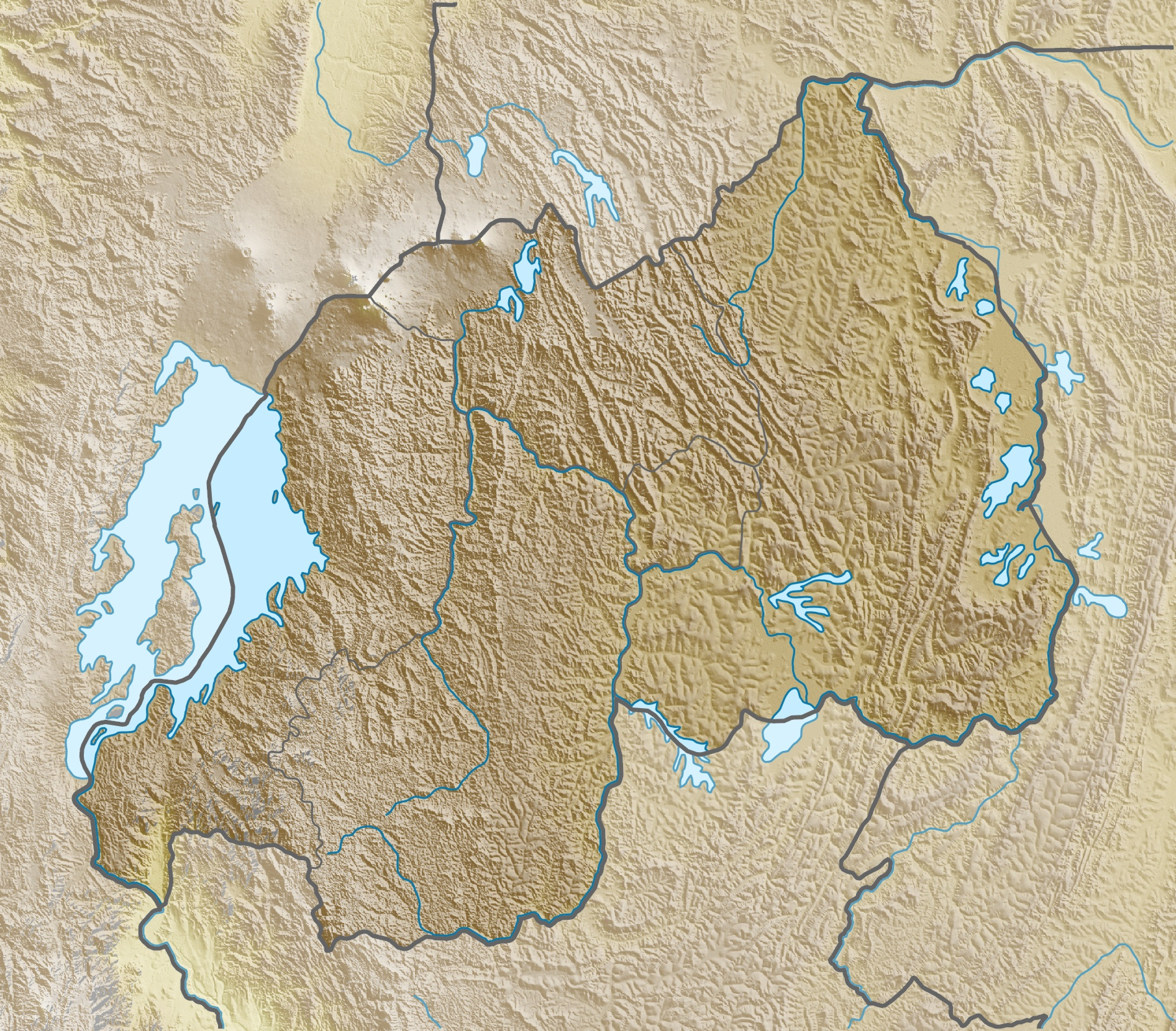
- Map of Rwanda showing the location of Nyabarongo I Hydroelectric Power Station
- Country: Rwanda
- Location: Mushishiro, Muhanga District
- Coordinates: 01°59′19.5″S 29°37′59.5″E
- Purpose: Power
- Status: Operational
- Construction cost: US$110 million

Dam and spillways
- Impounds: Nyabarongo River

Reservoir
- Normal elevation: 1,550 m (5,090 ft)

Power Station
- Commission date: 2014
- Type: Run-of-the-river
- Turbines: 2 x 14 MW (19,000 hp)
- Installed capacity: 28 MW (38,000 hp)

Nyabarongo I Hydroelectric Power Station is a 28 megawatts (38,000 hp) hydroelectric power station in Rwanda.

== Location ==
The power station is located across the Nyabarongo River, near the settlement of Mushishiro, Muhanga District, in Rwanda's Southern Province. This location lies approximately 75 kilometres (47 mi), by road, southwest of Kigali, the capital and largest city in Rwanda. Mushishiro lies approximately 35 kilometres (22 mi), by road, south of the provincial headquarters at Gitarama.

== Overview ==
Nyabarongo I Power Station is a hydropower plant in Rwanda, completed in October 2014, with a commissioning date in November 2014. At an estimated cost of US$110 million, the planned capacity installation is 28 MW. The project involves a dam, with run of river design, across the River Mwogo, one of the tributaries of Nyabarongo River. The project, undertaken by Angelique International Limited and Bharat Heavy Electricals Limited of India, is the largest hydropower installation in Rwanda, to date. Naresh Kapoor Sr., General Manager is the Chief Project Officer appointed by Angelique International Limited of India. Part of the engineering work was also subcontracted to the Australian company Snowy Mountains Engineering Corporation (SMEC). Both the units were synchronised to the Rwandan grid on 27 October 2014 and 30 October 2014. The Rwanda government gave the contractor a deadline in October 2014. The power station was completed and handed over by consortium to client on 28 November 2014. It was officially inaugurated by the president of Rwanda on 5 March 2015.

== Other considerations ==
- Material handling, etc. of complete E&M package of 2x14 MW Vertical Francis Hydro Generating Units at Nyaborongo HEP, Republic of Rwanda, Africa package carried out by FITWELL Power Projects an Indian company as sub-contractor of BHEL.

== See also ==
- List of power stations in Rwanda
- List of hydropower stations in Africa
- List of hydroelectric power stations
- Gisenyi
