= Leon Mutesa =

Rwandan human geneticist

- Born: Leon Mutesa; Rwanda
- Education: University of Rwanda; University of Liège
- Awards: African Prize for Lifetime Contribution in human genetics by HUGO
- Scientific career
- Fields: Human Genetics
- Workplaces: University of Rwanda

Leon Mutesa is a Rwandan professor of human genetics who serves as the director of the Center for Human Genetics at the College of Medicine and Health Sciences, University of Rwanda, a centre he established in 2006. Mutesa obtained his MD from the University of Rwanda in 2003 and earned his PhD in 2009 from the University of Liege, Belgium, where he also completed his postdoc in 2011. Mutesa's career has been marked by involvement in clinical services, academia, research, capacity-building, and health sector management.

Mutesa is a Rwandan pioneering figure in the field of genetics; he led the development and implementation of Rwanda's reference center for medical genetics, the only facility of its kind in East Africa. Mutesa is a board member of the International Vaccine Institute and serves as president of the Rwanda Down Syndrome Organization, which supports people with Down syndrome in Rwanda. In April 2024, he was awarded the African Prize for Lifetime Contribution in Human Genetics by the HUGO-Human Genome Organisation.

== Education ==
Mutesa attended the University of Rwanda, where he graduated with a bachelor's degree in human biology in 1998. Subsequently, Mutesa continued his enrolment at the institution to pursue a medical and surgical degree; he graduated with a Bachelor of Medicine, Bachelor of Surgery in 2003. Since 2009, Mutesa holds a PhD degree in human genetics from the University of Liège, Belgium.

== Academic career ==
After graduating with a Bachelor of Medicine, Bachelor of Surgery in 2004, Mutesa started working at the University of Rwanda, College of Medicine and Health Sciences, as an assistant lecturer. In 2006, he founded the Center for Human Genetics at the institution and became its director. In 2010, he became senior lecturer. In 2015, Mutesa rose to associate professor of human genetics. He has been a visiting professor of human genetics at various institutions, including the University of Liège in Belgium, Cheikh Anta Diop University in Senegal, and he was promoted to the Professor title in 2019. His academic dedication has led him to create various postgraduate programs at the University of Rwanda including MSc and PhD in biotechnology and others for strengthening the biopharmaceutical and vaccine manufacturing capacity in Rwanda. He has supervised/mentored over 90 MSc, MMed, PhD, and Post-Doc fellows from Rwanda and overseas universities.

== Additional career ==
Between 2009 and 2011, Mutesa was a director of the Department of Clinical Biology at the University Teaching Hospital of Kigali (CHUK), the largest referral hospital in Rwanda. Subsequently, he was appointed by the government of Rwanda as the head of the Medical Research Division at the Rwanda Biomedical Centre, a Rwanda's national health implementation agency established by the Ministry of Health. His work included coordinating health-related research activities in all national medical institutions; he served until 2013. Between 2013 and 2021, Mutesa worked with the Rwanda National Police as a consultant for the implementation of the Rwanda Forensic Institute, a laboratory that supports the justice system with evidence based on science and technology for use in courts of law and other justice bodies in Rwanda. He also contributed to creation of forensic science bachelor's degree program at the University of Rwanda. Mutesa has been serving as Editor-in-Chief for the Rwanda Medical Journal and the Rwanda Public Health Bulletin since 2010 and 2019, respectively.

== Scientific contributions ==
=== Pioneering scientific initiatives ===
Mutesa has pioneered new development and implementation of a reference center for human genetics and genomics in Rwanda, which is the only one in the East African Region. In 2009, Mutesa joined the African Society of Human Genetics (AfSHG) and created the Rwandan Society of Human Genetics (RSHG) in 2016, for which he serves as its president. In 2018, Mutesa led the team that organized and hosted the joint 11th Conference of AfSHG, 1st Conference of RSHG, and 12th H3Africa Consortium Meeting in Kigali, Rwanda.

In 2014, Mutesa advocated for health insurance coverage for genetic examinations for patients in Rwanda, and currently, most health insurances cover the karyotype exam, cytogenetic, and molecular tests. In 2016, Mutesa and Edwige Musabe created the Rwanda Down Syndrome Organization, which trains family members and teachers in Rwanda to support the development of children with Down syndrome; in 2021, it was following over 1,000 patients. Mutesa has served as president of the organization since its founding.

=== Epigenetics and PTSD studies ===
Mutesa served as Principal Investigator of several research grants from National Institute of Health (NIH) among others, which aimed at characterizing the intergenerational transmission of epigenetic impact of genocide exposure and post-traumatic stress disorder (PTSD) in women survivors of the 1994 genocide against the Tutsi in Rwanda and their offspring. This was one of the most significant scientific endeavors, and the proof of concept showing that in utero genocide exposure was connected to CpGs in 3 of the 24 DMRs: BCL-6 corepressor (BCOR), PR/SET Domain 8 (PRDM8), and Von Willebrand Factor D and EGF Domains (VWDE), with higher DNAm in exposed vs. unexposed offspring. Furthermore, BCOR and VWDE demonstrate a significant correlation between brain and blood DNAm within individuals, suggesting that these peripherally derived signals of genocide exposure may have implications for the brain. These findings indicate that PTSD continues to be a burden not only for those who were directly exposed to the 1994 genocide against the Tutsi, but also for future generations. Several potential biological markers were identified, including cortisol levels and a number of epigenetic alterations, and some of which were shared between generations (mother and affected offspring). This study's findings have a comparative effect on populations living in regions with persistent trauma conflicts resulting from war and other forms of violence. Mutesa's studies have shed light on the mechanisms by which epigenetic modifications impact cellular processes and contribute to various health conditions, advancing the knowledge of how epigenetic regulation affects gene function and providing insights for developing novel therapeutic strategies.

Mutesa also has investigated how epigenetic modifications affect gene expression and contribute to disease. His research, including a 2020 study on the immune response to COVID-19, has focused on understanding how environmental factors and genetic predispositions interact to influence epigenetic changes. These modifications can have profound implications for health and disease. Mutesa's studies have shed light on the mechanisms by which epigenetic modifications impact cellular processes and contribute to various health conditions, advancing the knowledge of how epigenetic regulation affects gene function and providing insights for developing novel therapeutic strategies.

=== Human Genetics and Genomic Medicine ===
Mutesa has made notable contributions to the field of human genetics, focusing on genetic variations and their implications for health. His research has explored the genetic underpinnings of various diseases, including rare genetic disorders prevalent in specific populations. For instance, his 2016 study on Down syndrome emphasized the increased burden associated with advanced maternal age in the African context. By analyzing genetic data, Mutesa has helped identify genetic markers associated with disease susceptibility and progression, leading to a better understanding of the genetic factors influencing health outcomes. His work has provided valuable insights into the genetic and genomic basis of disease, which are crucial for developing targeted therapeutic interventions and improving diagnostic methods.

=== Genomics ===
Between July 2004 and July 2006, Mutesa led a study about neonatal screening for sickle cell disease in Central Africa, where 1825 newborns with a new ELISA test from Burundi, Rwanda, and the East of the Democratic Republic of the Congo were examined. Since 2007, Mutesa has conducted various studies on Down syndrome, particularly in Africa.

=== Malaria ===
Mutesa's research on malaria has significantly contributed to understanding the disease's genetic and environmental factors, influencing susceptibility and treatment responses. His studies have explored malaria epidemiology, identifying genetic markers that could affect disease progression and treatment outcomes. Mutesa's work has helped enhance public health strategies aimed at malaria prevention and management, supporting efforts to reduce transmission and improve patient care through targeted interventions. His contributions continue to impact malaria research, particularly in the context of African populations, where malaria remains a major public health challenge.

=== COVID-19 ===
As a geneticist, during COVID-19, Mutesa was among the Rwandan government's COVID-19 task force, where he was coordinating COVID-19 laboratory testing under WHO consultancy. Mutesa and his research group implemented various research projects aiming at building human capacity for SARS-CoV-2 laboratory diagnostic and management in Rwanda. They discovered a COVID-19 pooling testing strategy that shows a cost-saving approach for better use of SARS-CoV-2 limited testing resources, and they published a Nature's paper on their discovery. His work on genomic surveillance of SARS-CoV-2 had a positive impact for understanding the geographical phylogenetic dynamic of variants during the pandemic.

Mutesa's research on COVID-19 has been comprehensive and instrumental in understanding the pandemic's impact and response strategies. His contributions include detailed analyses of Rwanda's preparedness activities and response updates from 2020, examining the role of media in managing the crisis, and evaluating the effectiveness of technologies used in COVID-19 containment. Mutesa's 2020 work also addressed the implications of easing lockdown restrictions and reviewed global treatment trends. Additionally, his 2021 study investigated the observed lower-than-predicted mortality rates in Rwanda, while his 2022 research highlighted innovative approaches, such as the use of trained scent dogs for detecting COVID-19. His research played a critical role in shaping public health strategies and responses to the pandemic.

=== Clinical trials ===
Mutesa involved in the improvement of clinical trial ecosystem in Rwanda and has contributed to the development of national investment case of clinical trial guidelines. In 2022, he led 2 major clinical trials, one on malaria, a multi-center Phase III randomized controlled non-inferiority clinical trial, a study by the Development of Triple Artemisinin Combination Therapies (DeTACT), and another on the COVID-19 mRNA vaccine candidate, a Phase I/IIa trial funded by Oxford and the International Vaccine Institute, respectively.

== Awards ==
- 2024: African Prize for Lifetime Contribution in human genetics by HUGO-Human Genome Organization.
