= François Rukundakuvuga =

François Régis Rukundakuvuga is a Rwandan judge and the current president of Court of Appeal of Rwanda.

== Career ==
He was appointed by President Paul Kagame and confirmed by the Rwandan senate on 28 April 2021 replacing Aimé Muyoboke Kalimunda who was elevated to the Supreme Court as a justice. Rukundakuvuga served as a commissioner at the Rwanda law reform commission in 2018 before being appointed a justice of the Supreme Court of Rwanda in 2019. He remained in this position until his appointment as the president of Court of Appeal in 2021.
