= Judith Kinnear =

Geneticist, first woman to head a New Zealand university

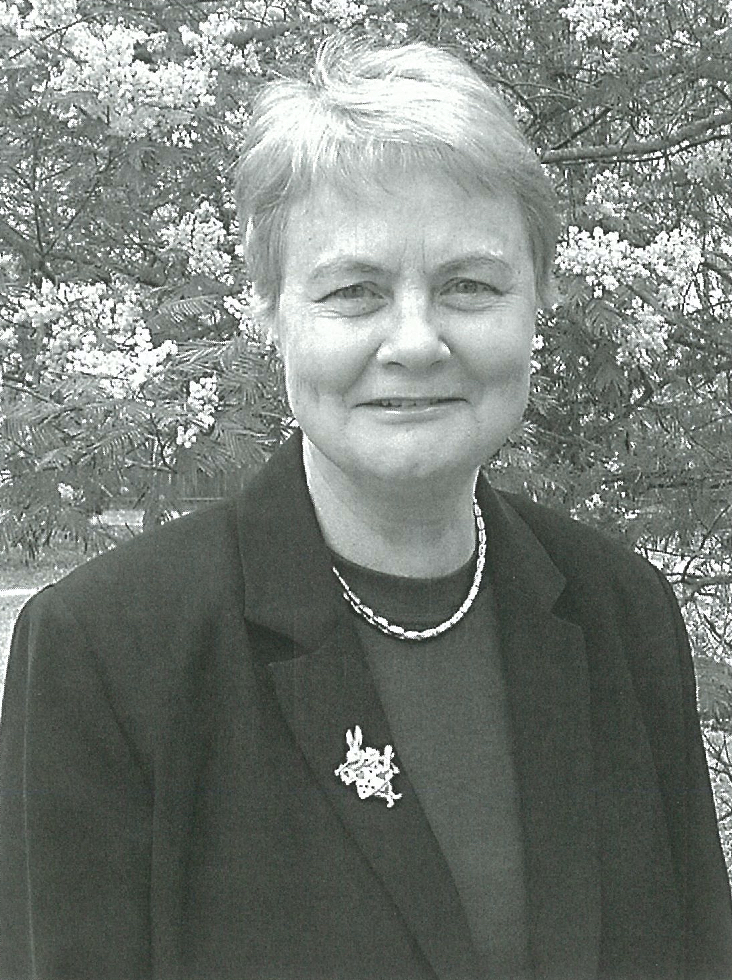
- Kinnear in 1992
- Born: 1939 (age 85–86)
- Citizenship: Australian
- Known for: CATLAB; Nature of Biology textbook series
- Scientific career
- Institutions: University of Melbourne, University of Sydney, Massey University
- Thesis: The origin and inter-relationships of larval and imaginal proteins in Calliphora: a contribution to the study of gene action in insect metamorphosis. (1973)

4th Vice-Chancellor of Massey University
- In office 2002–2008
- Preceded by: James McWha
- Succeeded by: Steve Maharey

Judith Kinnear (born 1939) is an Australian academic, a geneticist, and the first woman to head a New Zealand university.

== Academic career ==
Kinnear was educated at Kilbreda College in Melbourne, Australia, and holds a BSc, an MSc and a PhD in Genetics from the University of Melbourne. Her PhD was titled "The origin and inter-relationships of larval and imaginal proteins in Calliphora: a contribution to the study of gene action in insect metamorphosis." She also has a Bachelor of Education from La Trobe University.

While a senior lecturer in biology at Melbourne State College in the 1970s, Kinnear wrote computer programmes to help teach genetics through simulations of animal breeding. To further her understanding of the underlying mathematics of her programmes, she applied for the Graduate Diploma of Computer Simulation at Swinburne University of Technology, and was initially refused entry until she demonstrated her prior mathematical experience. She persuaded a friend and Professor of Biology Marjory Martin to join her in the classes, and the two became the only two women in the class. They went on to write an award-winning series of textbooks together, the Nature of Biology series. Kinnear's education programmes for genetics include CATLAB, BIRDBREED and Heredity Dog.

Kinnear was a Professor of Biology at the University of Sydney, and then Deputy Vice-Chancellor, before moving across the Tasman to become the first female Vice-Chancellor of a New Zealand university in 2003. As Vice-Chancellor of Massey University, Kinnear's relationship with the university council was reported to be strained at times. She retired in 2008 and returned to Australia.

In 2017 Kinnear was selected as one of the Royal Society Te Apārangi's "150 women in 150 words", celebrating the contributions of women to knowledge in New Zealand.

== Selected works ==
- Judith Kinnear; Marjory Martin, Nature of Biology, Jacaranda Press, Wikidata Q104605533
