= Israel Bimpe =

Rwandan pharmacist

Israel Bimpe is a Rwandan pharmacist and blogger who is passionate about global health and social justice with a keen interest in global health policy and advocates for open access and improvement of health workforce education, particularly pharmacy education.

He was President of the International Pharmaceutical Students Federation (IPSF) between August 2016 and September 2017, one of the world’s oldest international student volunteer organisation. IPSF is the leading international advocacy organisation for pharmacy students with the aim to promote improved public health through provision of information, education, networking as well as a range of publications and professional initiatives. Today, the Federation represents over 350,000 pharmacy students and young graduates from 84 countries worldwide.

In 2017, Bimpe started working with Zipline as their Head of National Implementation- Rwanda. Currently, he is the Director of Africa Sales & Customer Success.

He is a contributor to The Kigalian, an online magazine that publishes articles about trends on social media, technology, arts and culture, photography, and commentaries about Rwanda.

He is a member of the World Economic Forum Global Shapers in the Kigali Hub. He served in the past as Vice President and Chairperson of the African Regional Office of the International Pharmaceutical Students' Federation, Executive Director of the Rwanda Children's Cancer Relief, Executive Editor of the Pen Review at the Youth Literacy Organisation, President of the Rwanda Pharmaceutical Students' Association, among several involvement with different organisations.

During his time at the School of Medicine and Pharmacy of the University of Rwanda, He funded MEDInspire, an educational drive for developing students and recent graduates’ broad knowledge and promote a discussion of issues of current concerns, thus perpetuate excellence in the medical profession.

Bimpe was born in Bukavu, DRC and raised in Huye, went to Ecole le Pigeonnier for his primary education, Groupe Scolaire Officiel de Butare (GSOB) then Ecole Autonome de Butare for his secondary education and Holds a bachelor's degree in Pharmacy (with honors) from the University of Rwanda.
