= Gishoma Thermal Power Station =

Power plant in Rwanda

- Country: Rwanda
- Location: Rusizi District, Western Province
- Coordinates: 02°30′51″S 28°55′29″E
- Status: Under construction
- Construction began: 2010
- Commission date: April 2017
- Owner: Shengli Energy Group

Thermal power station
- Primary fuel: Peat

Power generation
- Nameplate capacity: 15 MW (20,000 hp)

Gishoma Thermal Power Station is a 15 MW (20,000 hp), peat-fired thermal power plant, under construction in Gishoma, Rusizi District, in the Western Province of Rwanda.

== Location ==
The power station is located in Gishoma, Rusizi District, in Rwanda's Western Province, approximately 210 kilometres (130 mi), by road, southwest of the city of Kigali, the capital and largest city in the country.

== Overview ==
As part of efforts to diversify the national energy generation sources, and in view of the considerable deposits of peat in the country, the government of Rwanda, through its wholly owned parastatal Energy Water and Sanitation Authority (EWSA), contracted Shengli Energy Group Limited', a Chinese company, to build Gishoma Thermal Power Station, under the supervision of an Indian firm, Punj Lloyd Limited.

The peat to fuel the power station would be extracted from the Gishoma marshes, close to where the power station is located. Peat Energy Company, a private Rwandan peat mining and supply company, contracted with EWSA to supply the raw material.

After the construction contract had been awarded, it became clear that mistakes had been made in the design of the power station, the feasibility estimates, and the sourcing of water needed for the power station to operate. It has recently come to the attention of the planners that the Gishoma marshes peat reserves can only sustain the 15 MW plant for a maximum of five years. At that time the plant would either be relocated, or peat would have to be trucked in from remote Rwandan sites.

== Timetable and funding ==
The construction of this power station was originally budgeted to cost US$36 million (about Rwf24.8 billion), borrowed from the Bank of Kigali, Rwanda's largest commercial bank by assets. Despite the delays and miscalculations, the power station was expected to come online in August 2016. The power plant came online in April 2017.

== See also ==
- List of power stations in Rwanda
- Energy in Rwanda
