= Rwanda Energy Group =

Government-owned energy company in Rwanda

Coordinates: 01°56′44″S 30°03′26″E

Rwanda Energy Group Limited
- Company type: Parastatal
- Industry: Energy generation and distribution
- Founded: 2014
- Headquarters: Kigali, Rwanda
- Key people: Armand M. Zingiro (CEO)
- Products: Electricity
- Website: Homepage

Rwanda Energy Group Limited (REG), is a government-owned holding company responsible for the import, export, procurement, generation, transmission, distribution and sale of electricity in Rwanda. It performs its functions through two wholly owned subsidiaries, (a) the Energy Utility Corporation Limited (EUCL) and the Energy Development Corporation Limited (EDCL).

== History ==
On 31 January 2014, the Rwandan parliament enacted a law, splitting the Energy Water and Sanitation Authority (EWSA) into two separate entities: (a) the Water and Sanitation Corporation (WASAC) and (b) the Rwanda Energy Group Limited (REG). REG was incorporated as holding company, with two subsidiaries, owned 100 percent (1) the Energy Development Corporation Limited (EDCL) and (2) the Energy Utility Corporation Limited (EUCL). REG was created in July 2014.

== Operations ==
EDCL is responsible for identifying energy generation sites, procuring land, contractors and necessary infrastructure to develop power stations. Its mandate includes working in close collaboration with independent power producers IPPs in the country. EUCL is responsible for maintaining and improving power plants, transmission and distribution networks, as well as delivery of electrical energy to consumers at a sustainable fee.

REG serves as coordinator and overseer of both corporations, which are free to carry out their day-to-day operation in accordance with their business plans and mandates. REG works closely with the Rwanda Ministry of Infrastructure to set and monitor national goals and objectives.

== Governance ==
Rwanda Energy Group Limited is overseen by a board of directors chaired by Dr. Didacienne Mukanyiligira. The CEO of REG is Armand M. Zingiro, formerly Managing Director of EUCL, a subsidiary company of REG.

== See also ==
- Energy in Rwanda
- List of power stations in Rwanda
