= Riddlesdown Collegiate =

Location
- Honister Heights; Purley, London, CR8 1EX; United Kingdom; 51°19′33″N 0°05′16″W

Information
- Former name: Riddlesdown High School (until 2009)
- Type: Academy
- Motto: Learners of Today, Leaders of Tomorrow
- Opened: January 1958
- Sister school: As part of The Collegiate Trust: Courtwood Primary School; Gilbert Scott Primary School; Gossops Green Primary School; Kenley Primary School; Quest Academy; Waterfield Primary School
- Trust: The Collegiate Trust
- Department for Education URN: 138178 Tables
- Ofsted: Reports
- Principal: Mr Daniel Osborne
- Teaching staff: approx. 120
- Years offered: 7-13
- Gender: Coeducational
- Age: 11 to 18
- Enrolment: 2067
- Capacity: 2040
- Houses: 7
- Colours: Blue, green, purple, maroon, dark blue, yellow, light grey
- Website: https://www.riddlesdown.org

Riddlesdown Collegiate (formerly Riddlesdown High School) is a secondary school with academy status located in the Riddlesdown area of the London Borough of Croydon, UK. It is a coeducational school with around 2067 pupils (400 of those being post–16 students). The school takes its pupils mainly from the Sanderstead, Selsdon, Purley, Kenley, New Addington and South Croydon areas and specialises in science. Riddlesdown is the largest school in Croydon in terms of pupil numbers, and one of the most over-subscribed schools in the area.

Government data shows that 219 pupils (13.4% of all pupils) are eligible for free school meals.

== History ==
Riddlesdown school was built in 1957 and opened in January 1958 as a mixed secondary modern school. In 1971 it converted to comprehensive status, reopening as Riddlesdown High School, and remained a local authority mixed comprehensive school until 31 December 1991 when it was give grant maintained status. In 1996, a Sixth Form Centre was established on the site and Riddlesdown became a voluntary aided school under the Bourne Foundation in 1999.

In September 2009, the school's name changed from Riddlesdown High School to Riddlesdown Collegiate, featuring six colleges; four of which hold a mixture of years 7–11, a Creative Performing Arts college and a Sixth Form college. The school gained Academy status on 1 June 2012.

In 2017, the collegiate was awarded the World-class schools award, one of about 60 in the UK.

== Colleges ==
Each of the seven colleges has a distinctive uniform colour variation based on the college colour. Four of the six colleges in the collegiate are 11–16 colleges with another for sixth form (16–19) and a Creative and Performing Arts College.

List of Colleges
College name	Age/type	Main colour
Aquila	11–16	Blue
Orion	11–16	Green
Pegasus	11–16	Purple
Phoenix	11–16	Red
Creative Performing Arts	CPA	Dark blue
College VI	Post–16	Yellow/orange
Mackay	SEND / SENCO	Light Grey

== Ofsted ==
In a full Section 5 Ofsted inspection in 2016, the school was rated outstanding; however, an initial Section 8 inspection in 2021 suggested that a full inspection might have resulted in a lower rating, necessitating a full inspection next. The school received a full Section 5 Ofsted inspection on 21 March 2023 and was rated outstanding.

== Notable alumni ==
- Kate Moss, supermodel, 1985–1990
- Rickie Haywood Williams, DJ/broadcaster, 1991–1996
- Nigel Reo-Coker, footballer, 1995–2000
- Klariza Clayton, actress, 2000–2005
- Kieran Gibbs, footballer, 2001–2006
- Mark Shaw, singer (Then Jerico), 1974–1977
