= Beatrice Cyiza =

Rwandan politician

Beatrice Cyiza is a Rwandan Biodiversity and Environmental Expert, who serves as a Senior advisor at the African Wildlife Foundation , before that she served as the Permanent Secretary and as the Director General of Environment and Climate Change at the Ministry of Environment in Rwanda.

== Career ==
Before joining the ministry of Environment, Cyiza worked at the Rwanda Institute for Conservation Agriculture as the Administrative Coordinator for Academic Affairs, Extension and Applied Research. Prior to that, she served as an Environmental Audit and Monitoring Officer at Rwanda Environment Management Authority (REMA).

Cyiza is the former Permanent Secretary and Director General, Environment and Climate Change at the Ministry of Environment in Rwanda, overseeing the development and dissemination of legal instruments, strategies and programme related to environment protection, climate change and pollution control.

Before joining the Ministry of Environment, she worked at Rwanda Institute for Conservation Agriculture as the Administrative Coordinator for Academic Affairs, Extension and Applied Research.

Prior to that, she was an Environmental Audit and Monitoring officer at Rwanda Environment Management Authority (REMA). She was the Nagoya Protocol's focal point for seven years and she audited projects to gauge their compliance with environmental regulations.

She speaks fluently more than 4 languages including, English, French, Kinyarwanda, Swahili and others
