= Mary O'Kane =

Australian scientist

Mary O'Kane AC
- Born: 1954 (age 71–72); Mount Morgan, Queensland, Australia
- Education: University of Queensland; Australian National University; University of Turin
- Occupations: Company director, engineer, scientist, and former academic
- Known for: Automatic speech recognition

Mary Josephine O'Kane AC (born 1954) is an Australian scientist and engineer. She is also a company director and executive chairman of O'Kane Associates, a Sydney-based consulting practice specialising in government reviews and research and innovation advice to governments in Europe, Asia and Australasia.

O'Kane was selected to head the Albanese government's 12-month Australian Universities Accord review in November 2022, releasing the final report in February 2024. As of April 2026 she is the chair of the Australian Energy Market Operator (AEMO), appointed in 2024, and the Chancellor of the University of Queensland since July 2026.

== Early life and education ==
Mary Josephine O'Kane was born in Mount Morgan, Queensland, Australia.

She was educated in Toowoomba, Queensland. She then studied at the University of Queensland where she graduated with a Bachelor of Science, majoring in mathematics and physics.

She commenced her PhD at the Australian National University and was the recipient of a scholarship that allowed her to carry out postgraduate research at the University of Turin. She received her PhD in 1982.

== Career ==
O'Kane returned to Australia, where she worked at the NSW Institute of Technology. She received a Lectureship appointment in Artificial Intelligence and Theory of Computation at the Canberra College of Advanced Education, and was Dean of the Faculty of Information Sciences and Engineering at the University of Canberra from 1989 to 1993. She moved to the University of Adelaide in 1994, serving as Deputy Vice-Chancellor (Research) and Professor of Electrical and later as Vice-Chancellor and president from 1996 to 2001. During her tenure at the University of Adelaide, the drama department was dissolved.

O’Kane established her own consulting practice that has completed work for government and private sector clients. The company completed reviews of the Co-operative Research Centres and the Bureau of Meteorology.

In 2008, O'Kane was appointed by then NSW Premier Nathan Rees as the state's first Chief Scientist & Engineer. Her work included conducting an independent review of coal seam gas related activities, focussing on human health and environmental impacts. Reports of the review's findings were published in 2013 and 2014.

She examined at the request of government, the state's energy security, the decline of koala populations, rail coal dust emissions, and road tunnel air quality. In 2018, after almost 10 years in the role, O’Kane resigned to become Chair of the Independent Planning Commission of NSW (formerly the NSW Planning Assessment Commission).

In March 2022, O'Kane and former NSW Police Commissioner Mick Fuller were appointed to lead an inquiry into the causes of and response to the 2022 eastern Australia floods. In August 2022, the inquiry's findings were made public, making 28 recommendations, all of which were supported by the NSW government.

In November 2022, O'Kane was appointed to head a review into Australia's higher education system, the Australian Universities Accord. The Interim Report was released in July 2023, setting out a range of reform directions spanning teaching, research and funding. The Final Report was released in February 2024, making 47 recommendations to reform the higher education system, aiming to improve access and outcomes for diverse student cohorts and to support it more than doubling in size by 2050.

In 2024 she was appointed chair of the Australian Energy Market Operator.

In 2025, O'Kane was elected by the University of Queensland Senate as the 15th Chancellor, succeed Peter Varghese. She commenced her role on 11 July 2026.

== Honours ==
O'Kane is a Fellow of the Academy of Technological Sciences and Engineering and of the Royal Society of New South Wales and an Honorary Fellow of Engineers Australia.

O'Kane won the 2017 Erna Hamburger Prize. The Prize is awarded by the Ecole Polytechnique Federale de Lausanne in Switzerland to leading women scientists.

Also in 2017, O’Kane received the Peter Nicol Russell Memorial Medal – the most distinguished engineering prize in Australia.

O'Kane was appointed a Companion of the Order of Australia, Australia's highest civilian honour, in the 2016 Australia Day Honours for "eminent service to science and engineering, as a contributor to national policy development and governance, to the promotion of technology research and future energy supply, to higher education, and as a role model for young scientists".

That same year O'Kane received UNSW Sydney's inaugural Ada Lovelace Medal for her contribution to Australia through numerous and diverse roles over the past 30 years.

In 2014, O'Kane was awarded the Pearcey Medal to honour her contribution to the development and growth of the ICT professions, research and industry.

Academic offices
Preceded by Gavin Brown	Vice-Chancellor of the University of Adelaide; 1997–2001	Succeeded by Cliff Blake
