= Agahozo Shalom Youth Village =

Agahozo Shalom Youth Village (ASYV) is a home for orphans of the genocide and AIDS in Rwanda. It was originally set up to educate the orphans of the 1994 genocide against Tutsi.

== History ==
The village was founded by Anne Heyman, who died on 31 January 2014. Heyman and her husband, Seth Merrin raised $12 million in order to start the organisation. The couple started the organisation to offer a safe community and high school education for the orphans who were at risk. The ASYV was modeled after the Israeli youth villages that were built for Jewish orphans after the Holocaust. The first group of students were 125 in December 2008. By 2012 there were 375 students from ages 15 – 21. As of 2017, there are around 500 students from Rwanda.

== Overview ==
The village provides students a campus with a dining room, high school, health care clinic, homes, workshop spaces, plumbing, internet service, etc. The students study biology, history, math, economics, language, literature, agriculture, music, mechanization, etc. As the educators decided that the Entrepreneurship Course by the Government was theoretical, the ASYV partnered with the Mastercard Foundation and TechnoServ for the STRYDE (Strengthening Rural Youth Development through Enterprise) project for the Entrepreneurship Club. Seth Merrin's company, Liquidnet Holdings, has invested staff time and resources at the village, and $2 million for building the village. The $23 million solar panel project is built in Rwanda on the land owned by the Agahozo Shalom Youth Village.

== Process ==
The leaders of the Rwanda districts gives Agahozo Shalom a list of those teenagers who are in need of attending school. The organisation narrows down the list to 200 and visits the students to decide if the village would be a good fit. The organisation is maintained by a structure based on family. "Families" of students in every grade is split up by gender and they receive a "Mama", a Rwandan educator who lives in the house with them, a "big brother" or "big sister", a guidance counselor who visits weekly, and a foreign "cousin" volunteer who stays for a year. The staffs are referred to as "aunts' or "uncles". The students begin with the Year of Enrichment so that every students have a similar academic base.
