= Pascasie Nyirahabimana =

Rwandan physicist and educator

Dr. Pascasie Nyirahabimana is a Rwandan physicist and advocate for women in science. She is an educator at University of Rwanda College of Education (UR-CE) and developed the competence base curriculum used in Rwandan schools.

== Education ==
Nyirahabimana faced barriers to her education growing up and had assumed that she would become a teacher as a child, but not a scientist. She paused her education in 1995 to start a family, and returned to university after 1996. She attended the University of Rwanda College of Education (UR-CE) and achieved a bachelor's degree in science, with a specialization in physics and chemistry education, as well as a master's degree in physical science from the University of Liege and a post-graduate diploma in teaching and learning in higher education.

Nyirahabimana obtained her PhD in Physics Education from the UR-CE's African Centre of Excellence for Innovative Teaching and Learning Mathematics and Science (ACEITLMS).

== Career ==
She is one of the primary authors of Rwanda's standard primary and secondary science curriculum, as well as teacher training standards.

In 2026, she was the Head of the Department of Mathematics, Science, and Physical Education at the UR-CE.

== Advocacy ==
Aside from conducting research and authoring journal articles about physics education and the impact of gender bias in early science education, Dr. Nyurahabimana acts as a mentor and coach to other Rwandan and African women in STEM. She co-founded the Rwandan Association for Women in Science and Engineering (RAWISE) in 2015, along with Dr. Marie Chantal Cyulinyana and Dr. Jennifer Batamuliza, among many others.

=== Organizations ===
- Rwandan Association for Women in Science and Engineering (RAWISE) (co-founder and member of the RAWISE Executive Committee)
- Organization for Women in Science for Developing World (OWSD)
- Rwanda Astrophysics, Space and Climate Science Research Group (RASCSRG).
- Editorial Committee for the Rwandan Journal of Education
- Rukara Campus Anti-Corruption Committee (URCE)
- Rwanda Journal of Education (Editorial Board Member)

== See also ==
- Education in Rwanda
- Gender equality in Rwanda
