= Patricie Uwase =

Rwandan politician (born 1989)

- Born: 1989 (age 36–37)
- Education: Kigali Institute of Science and Technology (former KIST) University of California, Berkeley
- Occupation: Politician

Patricie Uwase (born 1989) is a Rwandan engineer and politician who served as Minister of State in the Ministry of Infrastructure of the Government of Rwanda until June 2024. Previously, she had served as chairperson of the Board of Rwandair and Permanent Secretary of Ministry of Infrastructure of Rwanda.

== Education ==
She holds a Bachelor of Science degree in civil engineering from the former Kigali Institute of Science and Technology (former KIST) in Rwanda, and a Master of Science in civil engineering from University of California, Berkeley
