= List of power stations in Rwanda =

The following page lists all power stations in Rwanda. The country is in the midst of a rapid expansion of its electrical grid, and many new plants are proposed or under construction. Rwanda planned to expand its grid power up to 556 MW in 2024. As of December 2022, the national installed generation capacity totaled 276.068 megawatts, with peak demand of 140.6MW.

== Hydroelectric ==
=== Operational ===
Hydroelectric station	Community	Coordinates	River	Type	Name of reservoir	Capacity (MW)	Year completed
Ntaruka Power Station	Ntaruka		Mukungwa River	Run of river	N/A	11.5 MW	1959
Mukungwa Power Station	Mukungwa		Mukungwa River	Run of river	N/A	12 MW	1982
Mukungwa II Power Station	Mukungwa		MUkungwa River	Run of river	N/A	2.5 MW	2010
Nyabarongo I Power Station	Nyabarongo		Nyabarongo River	Run of river	N/A	28 MW	2014
Rukarara Hydroelectric Power Station	Rukarara		River Rukarara	Run of river	N/A	9.5 MW	2010
Rusizi I Hydroelectric Power Station	Rusizi		Rusizi River	Run of river	N/A	30 MW	1958
Rusizi II Hydroelectric Power Station	Rusizi		Rusizi River	Run of river	N/A	44 MW	1989

=== Proposed ===
Hydroelectric station	Community	Coordinates	River	Type	Name of reservoir	Capacity (MW)	Year completed
Rusumo Power Station	Rusumo		Kagera River	Run of river	N/A	80 MW	2023 (expected)
Nyabarongo II Power Station	Nyabarongo		Nyabarongo River	Run of river	N/A	43 MW	2027
Rusizi III Power Station	Rusizi		Ruzizi River	Run of river	N/A	147 MW	2023
Rusizi IV Power Station	Rusizi		Ruzizi River	Run of river	N/A	287 MW	2025

== Thermal ==
=== Operational ===
Thermal power station	Community	Coordinates	Fuel type	Capacity	Year completed	Name of owner	Notes
KivuWatt Power Station	Kibuye, Karongi District		Methane	25 MW	2015	Contour Global	Under expansion to 100 MW
Kibuye Power Plant 1	Kibuye, Karongi District		Methane	3.5MW	2012	Government of Rwanda	
Gishoma Thermal Power Station	Rusizi District, Western Rwanda		Peat	15 MW	2016	Shengli Energy Group and Punj Lloyd	

=== Proposed ===
Thermal power station	Community	Coordinates	Fuel type	Capacity	Year completed	Name of owner	Notes
Gisagara Thermal Power Station	Gisagara District, Southern Rwanda		Peat	80 MW	2021 (expected)	Hakan	
Symbion Thermal Power Station	Nyamyumba, Gisenyi, Rubavu District		Methane	50 MW	2018 (expected)	Symbion Power Inc.	Can be expanded to 100 MW

== Solar ==
=== Operational ===
Solar power station	Community	Coordinates	Fuel type	Capacity	Year completed	Name of owner	Notes
Ngoma Solar Power Station	Kibungo, Ngoma District		Solar	2.4 MW	2011	Government of Rwanda	
Rwamagana Solar Power Station	Agahozo, Rwamagana District		Solar	8.5 MW	2015	Scatec Solar Company & Gigawatt Global Cooperatief	
Nasho Solar Power Plant	Rwinkwavu, Rwamagana District		Solar	3.3 MW	2018	Rwanda Energy Group	

== See also ==
- Energy in Rwanda
- List of largest power stations in the world
- List of power stations in Africa
