= Inter-University Council for East Africa =

Intergovernmental educational organization

The Inter-University Council for East Africa (IUCEA) is an institution of the East African Community, which is a regional intergovernmental organisation of the republics of Kenya, Tanzania, Uganda, Burundi, Rwanda and South Sudan. IUCEA aims to foster collaboration between member universities in the EAC region. It has its head offices in Kampala, Uganda. The IUCEA was founded in 1980.
