= Energy in Rwanda =

Energy use in Rwanda is undergoing rapid change at the beginning of the 21st century.

== Electricity ==
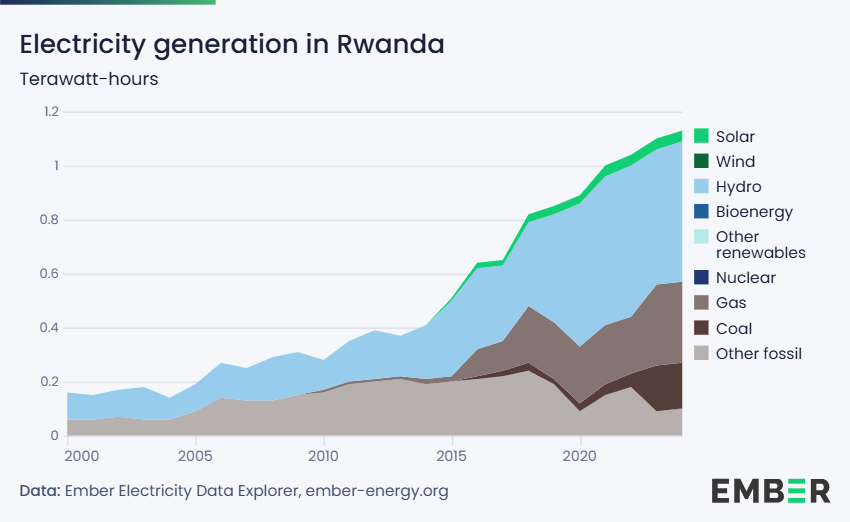
Electricity generation in Rwanda in terawatt-hours

=== Network ===
The extent of grid electricity is limited and mainly concentrated near Kigali. Most of the country uses firewood as its main energy source.

Rwanda is planning to expand from 276 MW of grid power in 2022 to 556 MW in 2024 and may import some additional electricity from neighboring countries. In addition, it is installing small solar units throughout the country to ensure that households located in off-grid areas have access to electricity, or to help deal with power outages. Currently, the government plans to bring electricity access to 100% of the population by 2024, as opposed to 74.5% in 2022.

In July 2023 it was announced that Saudi Arabia would provide a soft loan of $20 million to fund an electricity project in Rwanda set to benefit 60,000 people.

=== Electrical standards ===
Rwanda's main electricity supply operates at 230 V and 50 Hz.

Historically, Rwanda used Type C (Europlug) and Type E (French-style) plugs and sockets, reflecting the country's Belgian colonial legacy. As part of efforts to harmonize electrical standards within the East African Community (EAC), Rwanda adopted Type G (BS 1363) as its official plug and socket standard. New buildings and installations are required to use Type G sockets, aligning Rwanda with neighbouring EAC members Kenya, Tanzania and Uganda, which also use Type G.

Type C and Type E sockets remain common in older buildings throughout the country.

=== Generation ===
With its limited electrical infrastructure, Rwanda has a very high degree of renewable energy usage. Most of the country's electricity comes from hydropower. Solar electrical production accounted for 4% of energy use in the country in 2014.

==== Hydroelectricity ====
53% of electricity is generated by hydropower. At the end of 2018, Rwanda's grid-connected power plants supplied 221.1MW.

==== Gas-fired generation ====
KivuWatt project is an energy project to extract natural gas dissolved in Lake Kivu and use the extracted gas to generate electricity. In 2016, the operational 25 MW power plant was able to provide enough energy for 45,000 people in Rwanda. The ongoing expansion project is expected to add 26 MW of generating capacity in its first phase, and eventually scale up to 100 MW in the coming years.

==== Utility scale solar ====
The first utility-scale solar farm in Sub-Saharan Africa outside of South Africa is the 8.5 MW plant at Agahozo-Shalom Youth Village (Liquidnet Family High School), in the Rwamagana District, Eastern Province of Rwanda. It leased 20 hectares (49 acres) of land from the village which is a charity to house and educate Rwandan genocide victims. The plant uses 28,360 photovoltaic panels and produces 6% of total electrical supply of the country. The project was built with U.S., Israeli, Dutch, Norwegian, Finnish and UK funding and expertise.

==== Micro scale solar ====
The use of off-grid solar power has increased as solar panel prices have fallen and many areas do not expect grid connections in the near future. Solar power produces over 2% of electricity in the country. The country is in the midst of a rapid expansion of its electrical grid and many new plants are proposed or under construction.

==== Nuclear Power ====
Following the establishment of the Rwanda Atomic Energy Board in 2020, Rwanda has pursued plans to diversify its energy mix by incorporating nuclear power. With technical assistance from the International Atomic Energy Agency (IAEA), the country aims to deploy its first small modular reactor (SMR) in the early 2030s.

==== Biomass ====
Biomass is the most important energy source utilized through firewood and agricultural waste for cooking. In 2014, this represented 85% of Rwanda's energy use. Peat from peat marshes in southwestern Rwanda will power two electrical plants. The first 15 MW plant was expected online in 2015 with the second, an 80 MW plant, expected in 2017.

Generation type	Installed capacity 2019 (MW)
Thermal	103
Hydroelectric	98
Solar	12
Total	213

== Other energy sources ==
Petroleum, mainly for transportation, represented 11% of Rwanda's power in 2014. Although Rwanda is thought to have crude oil and natural gas reserves near Lake Kivu, as of 2014, there was no production of these resources and demand was met by imports. The Kenya–Uganda–Rwanda Petroleum Products Pipeline would transport oil between these countries if it is built.

== See also ==
- List of power stations in Rwanda
- EARP Rwanda
