= Lists of hydroelectric power stations =

The following are lists of hydroelectric power stations based on the four methods of hydroelectric generation:

- List of conventional hydroelectric power stations, hydroelectric generation through conventional dams
- List of pumped-storage hydroelectric power stations, hydroelectric generation through pumped-storage
- List of run-of-the-river hydroelectric power stations, hydroelectric generation through run-of-the-river hydropower
- List of tidal power stations, hydroelectric generation through tidal power

== See also ==
- List of hydroelectric power station failures
