= University of Rwanda =

Public university in Kigali, Rwanda

- Kaminuza y'u Rwanda; Université du Rwanda
- Type: Public
- Established: 2013; 13 years ago
- Accreditation: Higher Education Council, Rwanda
- Chancellor: Patricia L. Campbell
- Vice-Chancellor: Prof. Didas Kayihura Muganga
- Academic staff: 1,450
- Administrative staff: 816
- Students: 30,445
- Undergraduates: 28,875
- Postgraduates: 1,570
- Location: Kigali, Rwanda
- Language: English
- Colors: UR Blue.
- Website: www.ur.ac.rw

The University of Rwanda (Kinyarwanda: Kaminuza y'u Rwanda, French: Université du Rwanda) is a public collegiate, multi campus university based in Kigali, Rwanda. Formed in 2013 through the merger of previously independent education institutions, the University of Rwanda is the largest education institution in the country. The university is ranked number one in the country by the Government of Rwanda's Higher Education Council.

Today, the university is composed of seven independent and self-governing colleges operating across eight campuses. It hosts a number of centres including four African Centres of Excellence established by World Bank. During the 2021–2022 academic year, the university had 31,506 students, with 2058 in Masters Programs and 324 in Doctorate Programs.

== History ==
Initial work to establish the institution was undertaken by Professor Paul Davenport, a member of Paul Kagame's Presidential Advisory Council, who now acts as chair of the university's board of governors. In September 2013, laws establishing the National University of Rwanda and the country's other public higher education institutions were repealed, creating the University of Rwanda (UR) in their place.

Law number 71/2013 transferred the contracts, activities, assets, liabilities and denominations of seven institutions to the UR:

- The National University of Rwanda (UNR)
- The Kigali Institute of Science and Technology (KIST)
- The Kigali Institute of Education (KIE)
- The Higher Institute of Agriculture and Animal Husbandry (ISAE Busogo)
- The School of Finance and Banking (SFB, Mburabuturo)
- The Higher Institute of Umutara Polytechnic
- The Kigali Health Institute (KHI)

The University of Rwanda was created to improve the quality of education and effectively respond to national and global needs. Most of the university's senior managers were well-established scholars with records of improving the performance of their previous institutions. Other managers were well known elite Rwandans or dedicated friends of Rwanda and advisors to President Kagame. A key challenge facing the university was argued to be a lack of qualified lecturers.

The university leadership planned to increase the proportion of academic staff holding doctoral degrees from 16 per cent to 61 per cent by 2024. As of 2022, the proportion of doctorate degree rose to 35%.

== Organisation and administration ==
The organization of the University of Rwanda's leadership is divided into five levels.

=== Chancellor ===
The chancellor of the University of Rwanda is appointed by Presidential Order and has a ceremonial role of opening the academic year, presiding over graduation ceremonies, and granting other awards. The current chancellor is Patricia Campbell, the chief administrative officer of Tufts University. Campbell took over the role from Mike O'Neal, former president of Oklahoma Christian University.

=== Board of Governors ===
The Board of Governors is the governing and decision-making organ of the university. Members of the Board of Governors of UR, including the chairperson and the deputy chairperson, are appointed by the president on the basis of their ability, competence and expertise. In addition to members appointed by presidential order, there are members of the Board of Governors by virtue of managerial positions they hold in the university, and members who represent teachers, researchers, staff and students of UR. At least thirty per cent (30%) of the members of the Board of Governors must be female. Paul Davenport is the founding Chair of the UR Board.

=== Academic Senate ===
The Academic Senate is the senior organ responsible for academic affairs, research, and education in UR. The Academic Senate of the University of Rwanda is composed of the following persons: The Vice-Chancellor, Deputy Vice-Chancellors, Principals of Colleges, a Dean from each College elected by the Deans of that College, the Registrar of the university, an academic staff from each College, elected by peers and a student from each College elected by peers.

=== Senior Management of the University of Rwanda ===
The University of Rwanda senior management is composed of the Vice Chancellor, the Deputy Vice Chancellor in charge of Academic Affairs and Research, the Deputy Vice Chancellor in charge of Strategic Planning and Administration, and the Deputy Vice Chancellor in charge of Finance.

==== Vice Chancellor ====
The vice chancellor of the University of Rwanda the chief executive of the institution coordinating its daily activities. The Vice chancellor works hands in hands with three deputy vice chancellors. Since July 2022, The university's vice chancellor is Dr. Didas Muganga Kayihura, who took over the role from Prof Alexandre Lyambabaje. Other former vice chancellor are Phillip Cotton and Northern Irish botanist Professor James McWha.

==== Former Vice Chancellors ====
- Alexandre Lyambabaje: February 2021 - May 2022
- Philip Cotton: October 2015 - October 2020
- James McWha: October 2013 - October 2015

=== Colleges ===
The University of Rwanda is organized into six subject-based colleges:

- College of Arts and Social Sciences (CASS, Koleji yigisha iby’Indimi n’Ubumenyi bw’Imibereho y‘Abaturage/Collège des Lettres et Sciences Sociales)
- College of Agriculture, Animal Sciences and Veterinary Medicine (CAVM, Koleji y’Ubuhinzi, Ubumenyi n‘ubuvuzi bw‘Amatungo/Collège d’Agriculture, des Sciences Animales et Médecine Vétérinaire)
- College of Business and Economics (CBE, Koleji yigisha iby’Ubucuruzi n’Ubukungu/Collège des Affaires et de l’Economie)
- College of Education (CE, Koleji Nderabarezi/Collège de l’Education).
- College of Medicine and Health Sciences (CMHS; Koleji y’Ubuvuzi n’Ubuzima/Collège des Sciences de Médecine et de Santé)
- College of Science and Technology (CST, Koleji y‘Ubumenyi n‘Ikoranabuhanga/Collège des Sciences et Technologies)

== Campus Tour ==
The university of Rwanda offers courses via its six colleges distributed around 9 campuses.

=== Gikondo Campus ===
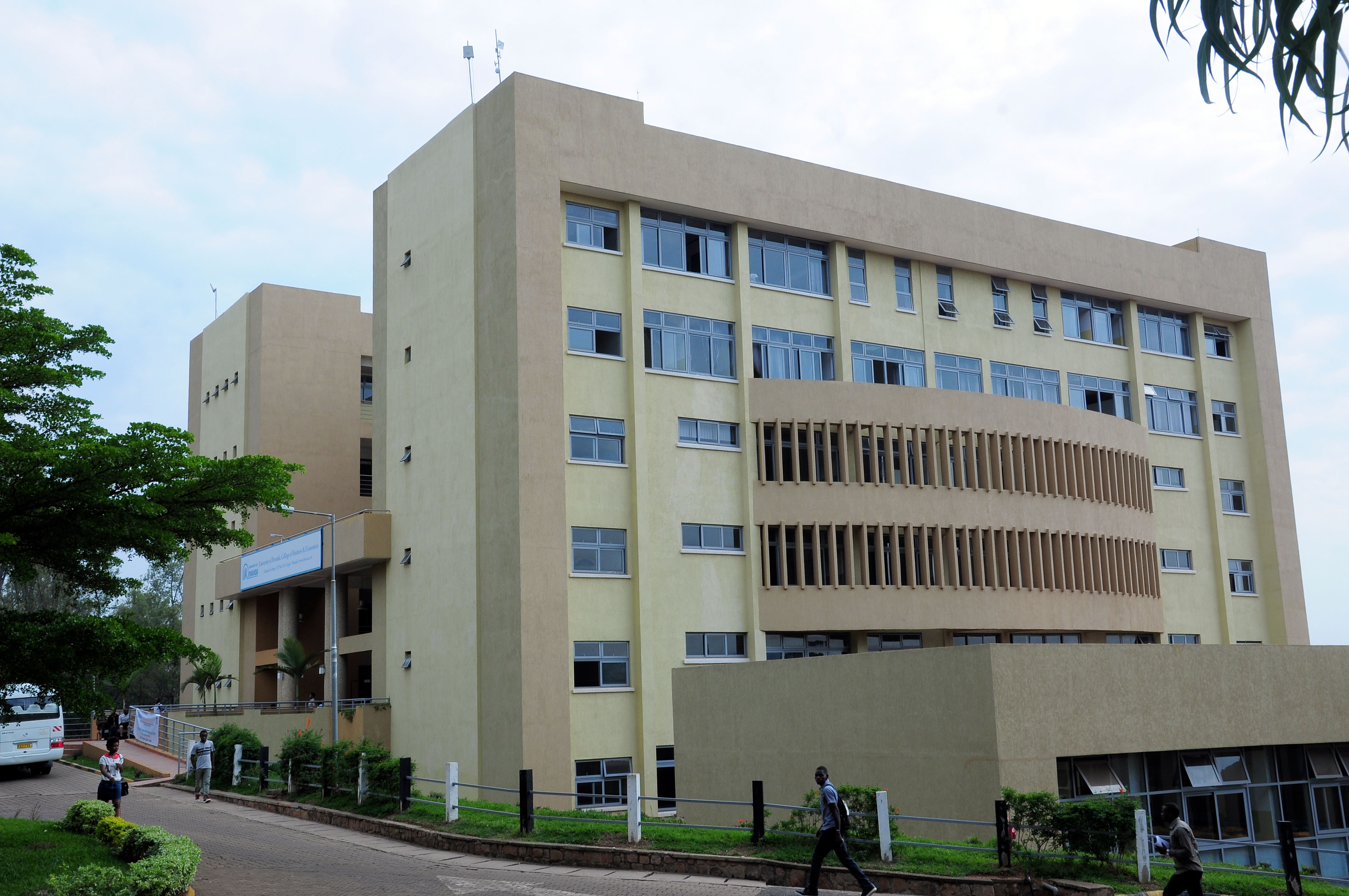
University of Rwanda, Gikondo Campus

Gikondo Campus is situated in Kigali in the former School of Finance and Banking. This campus houses the headquarters of University of Rwanda and is the seat of College of Business and Economics. In addition, this campus host the African Centre of Excellence in Data Science.

=== Remera Campus ===
Remera Campus is located in Kimironko in the Gasabo District of Kigali. It is situated in the former Kigali Institute of Education (KIE). Currently the campus hosts the college of medicine and health sciences. The University of Rwanda Polyclinic is located in this campus, providing health services.

=== Nyarugenge Campus ===
Nyarugenge Campus is located in the heart of Kigali City in the compounds that housed Kigali Institute of Science and Technology (KIST) and Kigali Health Institute (KHI). Currently, Nyarugenge campus is the headquarters of the College of Science and Technology. This campus hosts two World Bank funded African centers of excellence in Energy for Sustainable Development (ACEESD) and in Internet of Things (ACEIoT).

=== Huye Campus ===
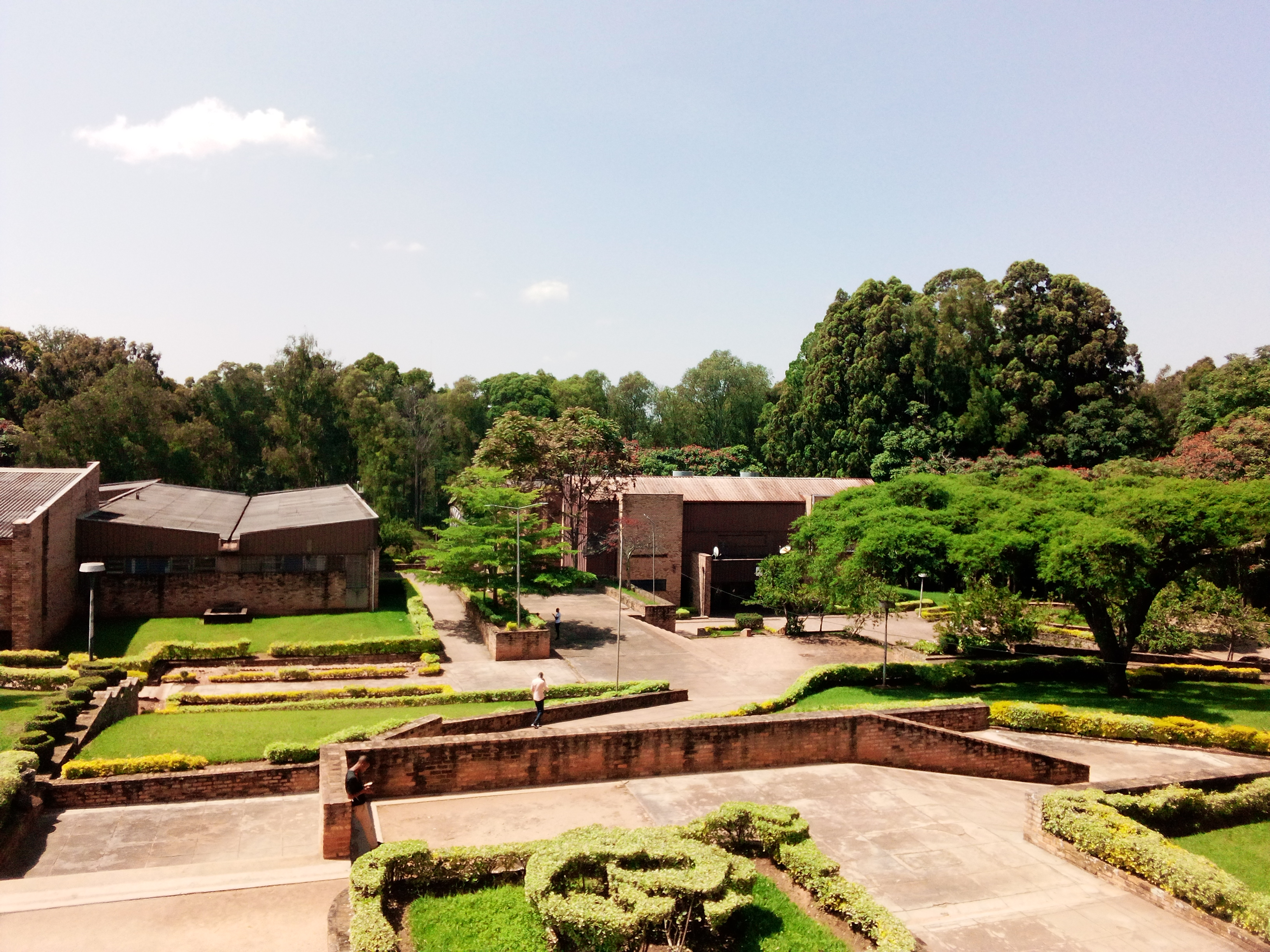
University of Rwanda, Huye Campus

Located in the Southern Province, Huye Campus is the university's largest both by land area and by the number of students. Because it is located in the premises that housed former National University of Rwanda, this campus is still regarded as the hub of higher education in Rwanda. Huye Campus is currently the seat of College of Arts and Sciences although the campus provides programs for students from other colleges.

=== Other Campuses ===
- Busogo Campus: Busogo campus is the seat of the college of agriculture and veterinary medicine. Busogo campus is located in Musanze District near Volcanoes National Park, the home of gorillas.
- Nyagatare Campus: Nyagatare campus is located in the Eastern Province near the Akagera National Park. The campus houses students from the college of agriculture and veterinary medicine.
- Rusizi Campus: Rusizi Campus is located in the West Province and provides programmes related to Business and Economics.
- Rukara Campus: Rukara campus is the seat of the College of Education. It is located in the Eastern Province at the outskirt of Muhazi Lake.
- Rwamagama Campus
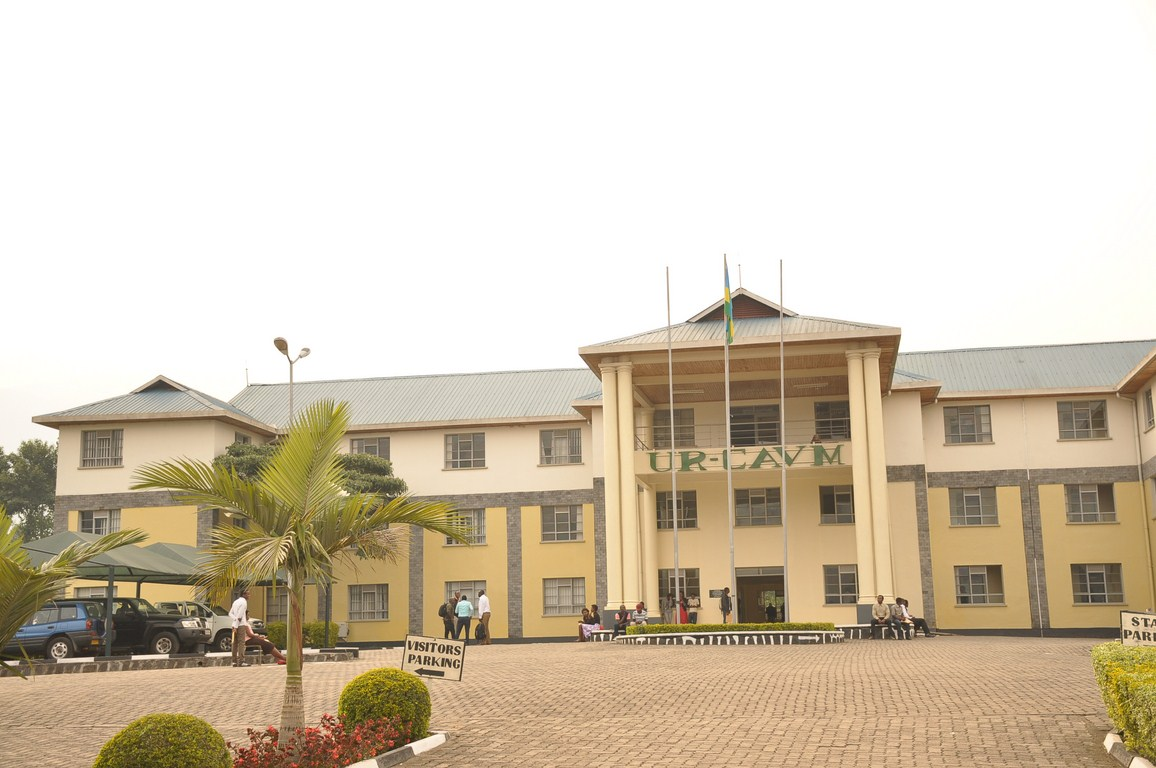
Busogo Campus

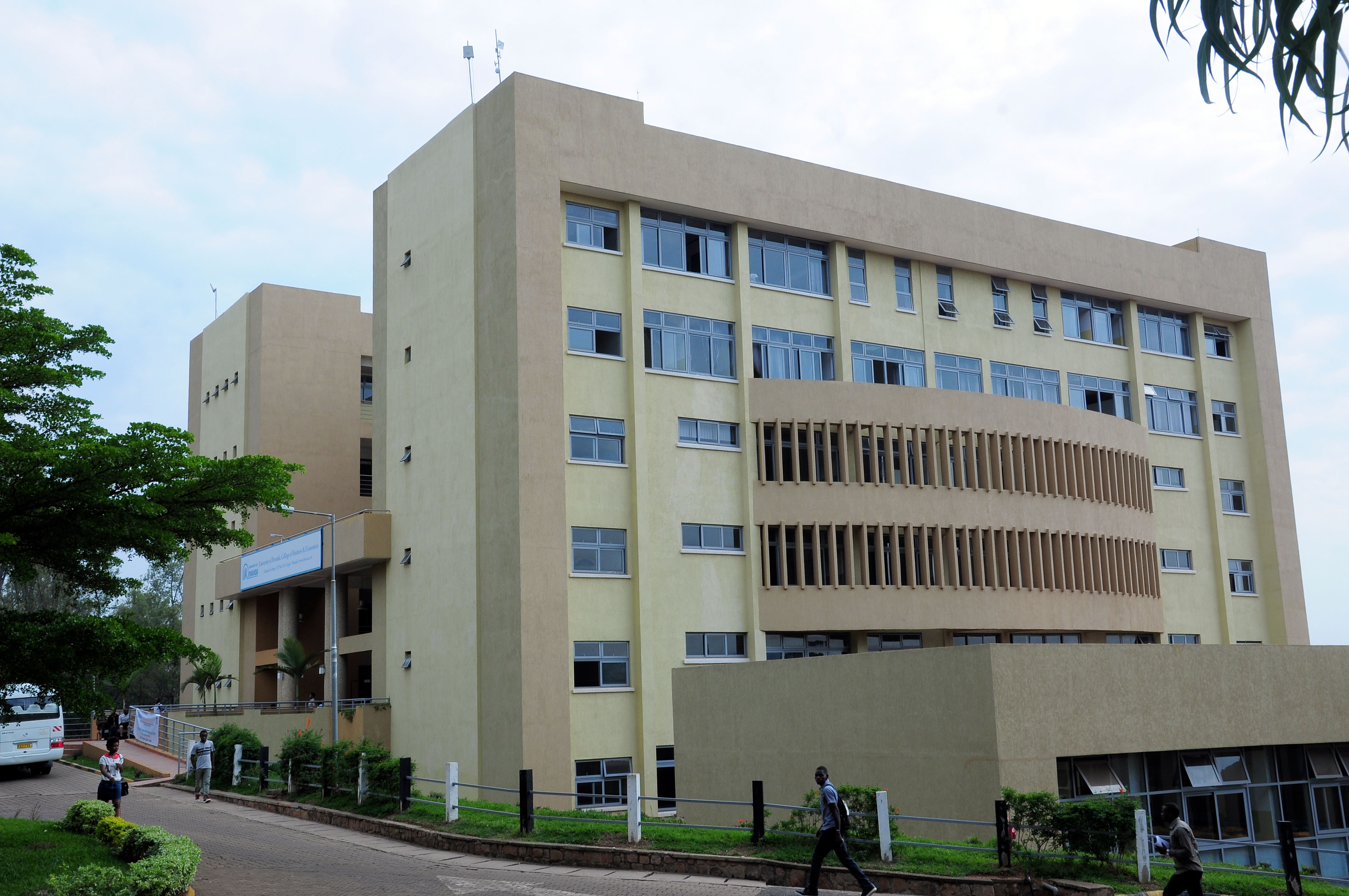
Gikondo Campus

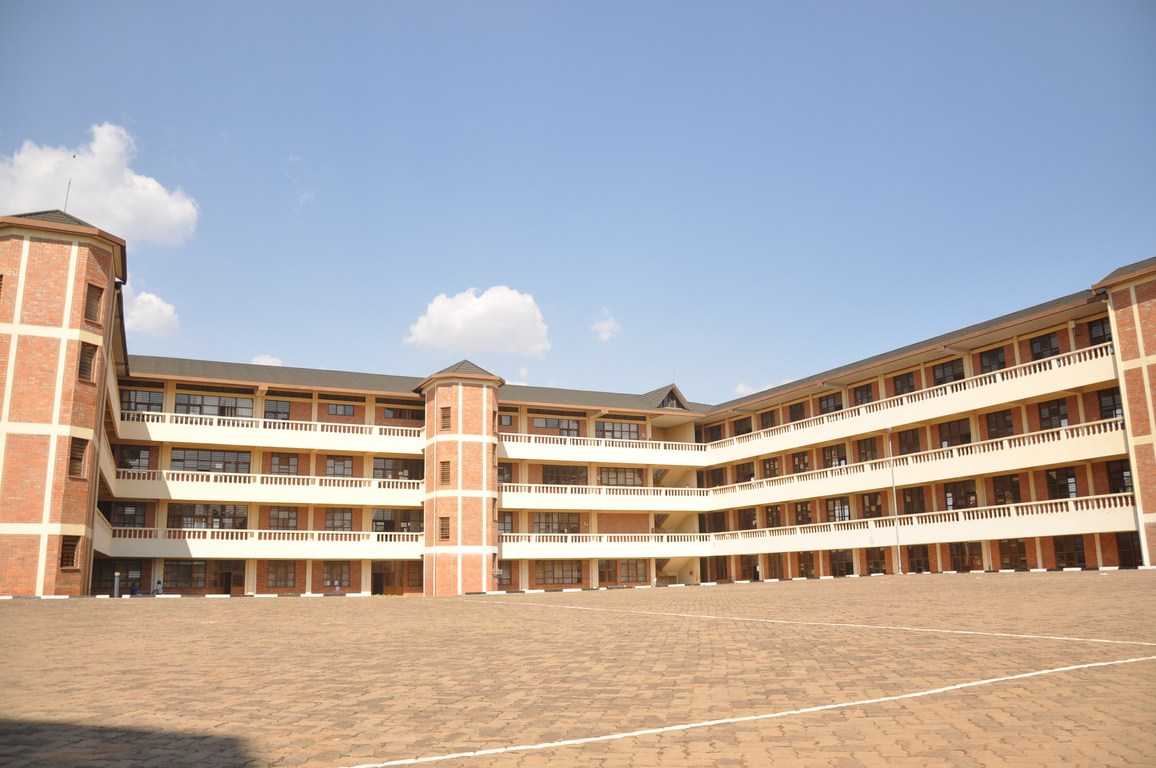
Remera Campus

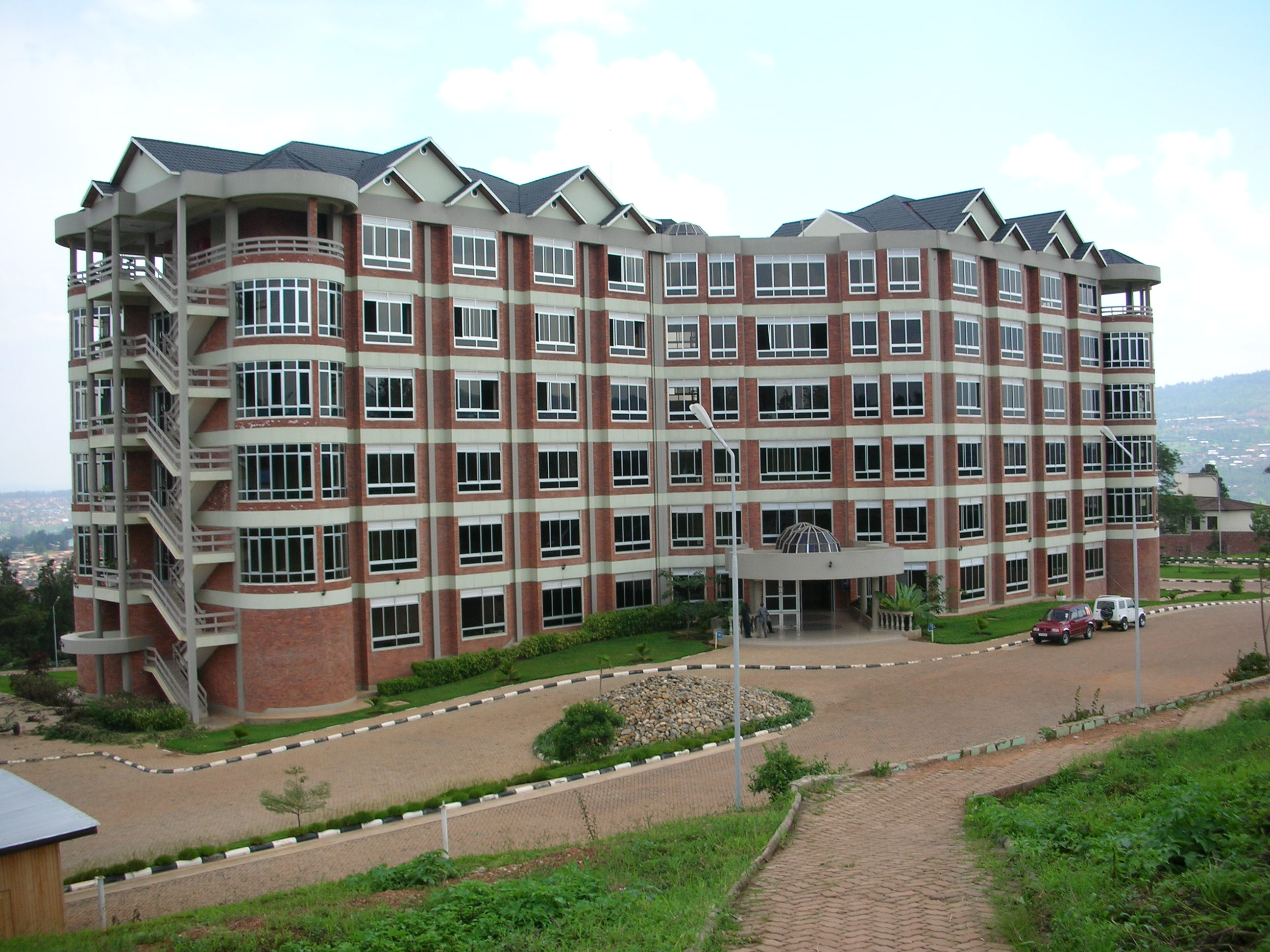
Nyarugenge Campus

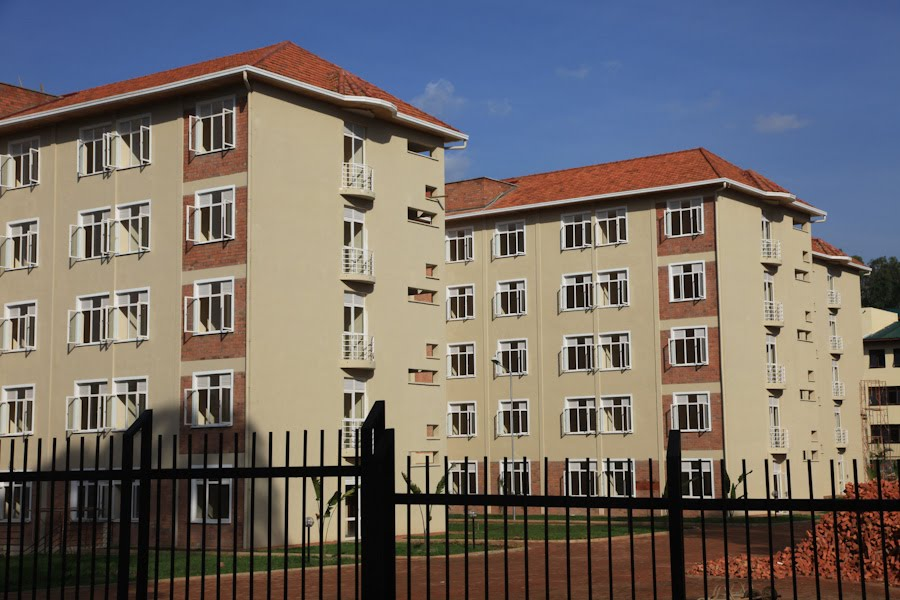
Huye Campus

== Arboretum of Ruhande ==
The Arboretum of Ruhande is a 500-acre stretch of botanical garden located at Ruhande Hill in the Huye Campus of the University of Rwanda. The project was established in 1934 as a laboratory to identify the most productive tree species that can adapt to local conditions, as a response to the growing demand for wood for fire and construction. The Arboretum of Ruhande has more than 500 different plant species totaling 320,000 trees. In addition, it hosts a number of wild animal species including monkeys, birds, bats, and many insects. The Arboretum was promoted in 2018 by the Queen's Commonwealth Canopy, a forest conservation program within the Commonwealth.

== Academic profile ==
=== Teaching and Learning ===
The University of Rwanda provides residential programs in six constituent colleges dispersed around nine campuses. In the academic year 2020, over 25,000 students were enrolled at the university. As of 2021, through its constituent colleges, the University of Rwanda offers 130 undergraduate degrees and diploma. The university also offers postgraduate programs in 70 subjects including PhDs. 99.4 per cent of UR students are Rwandan nationals. It employs 1,450 academics and 816 support and administrative staff.

=== African Centres of Excellences ===
Through a five years partnership with the World Bank and the Inter-university Council of East Africa, the University of Rwanda is home to four African Centers of Excellence The centers are

- African Centre of Excellence in Data Science (ACE-DS) is a Rwandan educational institution focusing on data science. It is situated at the University of Rwanda, and was established in 2018 under the funding of the World Bank's ACE II Project. ACE-DS offers Masters and PhD in data sciences. Postgraduate students often choose specializations that include Actuarial Science, Demography, Biostatistics, Econometrics, and Data Mining. ACE-DS Ph.D. programs are research-based doctorate where a candidates engage in original research in their chosen field of study. ACE-DS Programs have received accreditation by Data Science Council of America.
- African Centre of Excellence in Biomedical Engineering and e-Health (CEBE)
- African Centre of Excellence in Energy for Sustainable Development (ACEESD)
- African Centre of Excellence in Internet of Things (ACEIoT)
- African Center of Excellence for Teaching and Learning Mathematics and Science (ACEITLMS)
- African Centre of Excellence for Data Sciences (ACE-DS)

=== Partnerships ===
UR participates in a number of international collaborations. In February 2015, the University of Rwanda and Michigan State University launched a joint MSc degree programme in agribusiness, assisted by United States Agency for International Development funding. The programme aims to help Rwandan women establish themselves in agribusiness. The Swedish International Development Cooperation Agency is funding research capacity development in Rwanda through the university.

== Research Profile ==
The University of Rwanda has mission to increase research output. However, the number of publications have not increase significantly since the creation of the university. Since its foundation, the University of Rwanda produced 2800 publications. In 2014, the University of Rwanda had 305 publications. In 2021, the number rose to 350 publications, only an increase of 45 publications over 7 years.

== Notable people ==
=== Notable alumni ===
- Agnes Binagwaho, Rwanda's health minister, became the first person to be awarded a PhD by the new University of Rwanda in August 2014. Binagwaho, whose research concerned children's health rights in the context of HIV/AIDS, started her PhD in 2008 at Butare University, prior to the university merger.
- Edouard Ngirente, Rwandan politician and economist, former prime minister of Rwanda
- Nsanzimana Sabin, Rwandan politician and epidemiologist
- Israel Bimpe, Rwandan pharmacist
- Olivier Kabera, Rwandan engineer

=== Notable faculty ===
- Alexandre Lyambabaje, Rwandan politician and mathematician, former Vice Chancellor of the University of Rwanda
- James Mcwha, botanist and researcher, inaugural Vice Chancellor of the University of Rwanda
- Jeannette Bayisenge, Rwandan politician and associate professor of gender studies at the University of Rwanda
- Kayihura Didas Muganga, Rwandan lawyer and acting Vice Chancellor of the University of Rwanda
- Leon Mutesa: Rwandan geneticist and director of Centre for Human Genetics at the University of Rwanda
- Dr. Pascasie Nyirahabimana is a physicist and physics education researcher, as well as the Head of the Department of Mathematics, Science, and Physical Education
