= Monique Nsanzabaganwa =

Rwandan economist, politician and diplomat

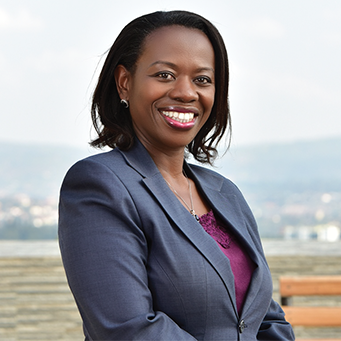

Deputy Chairperson of African Union Commission
- In office 6 February 2021 – 2025
- President: Moussa Faki
- Preceded by: Thomas Kwesi Quartey
- Succeeded by: Selma Haddadi

Deputy Governor of the National Bank of Rwanda
- In office 2011–2021
- Governor: Claver Gatete; John Rwangombwa
- Succeeded by: Soraya Hakuziyaremye

Minister of Trade and Industry
- In office 2008–2011
- President: Paul Kagame

Minister of State in charge of Economic Planning
- In office 2003–2008
- President: Paul Kagame

Personal details
- Born: 1971 (age 54–55) Rwanda
- Spouse: Theogene Bangwanubusa
- Education: Stellenbosch University (Master of Arts in Economics) (Doctor of Philosophy in Economics)
- Occupation: Economist and politician

Monique Nsanzabaganwa is a Rwanda economist, politician and diplomat, who served as the vice-chairperson of the African Union Commission from 2021 to 2025. Before that, between 2011 and 2021, she served as the deputy governor of the National Bank of Rwanda.

== Background and education ==
She was born in Rwanda circa 1971, and attended Rwandan schools prior to her University education. She holds a Bachelor of Arts degree in economics, from the National University of Rwanda. She studied at Stellenbosch University, in South Africa, graduating with a Master of Arts in economics, followed by a Doctor of Philosophy, also in economics.

== Career ==
Following her graduate studies abroad, she returned to Rwanda and worked as a lecturer in economics at the National University of Rwanda, from 1999 until 2003. Between 2003 and 2008, she served as the Minister of State responsible for Economic Planning in the Rwanda Ministry of Finance and Economic Planning. From 2008 until 2011 she was the Minister of Trade and Industry in the Rwandan cabinet.

As state minister for economic planning, Nsanzabaganwa is credited with creating a stronger statistical and planning system nationally and at local levels. She was a leader of the drive to establish the National Institute of Statistics of Rwanda. She is also credited with leading the efforts to set up the legal framework and policy guidelines for microfinance in Rwanda.

== Other considerations ==
She is a member of the African Leaders Network, a Fellow of the Aspen Global Leadership Network (AGLN), a Fellow of the Africa Leadership Initiative (ALI) East Africa and a Fellow of the John F. Kennedy School of Government's Executive Education in Public Financial Management. She has served as the chairperson of the board of directors of the National Institute of Statistics of Rwanda, since 2012.

She left office as Deputy Chairperson of the African Union Commission in 2025.

== Personal life ==
Nsanzabaganwa is a married mother of three children; two sons and one daughter.

== See also ==
- John Rwangombwa
- Aishah Ahmad
