= Gaspard Cyimana =

1st Minister of Finance and Economic Affairs of Rwanda

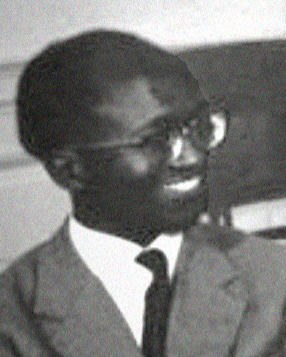

1st Minister of Finance and Economic Affairs of Rwanda
- In office 26 October 1960 – 12 June 1968
- President: Gregoire Kayibanda
- Preceded by: Office established
- Succeeded by: Fidèle Nzanana

1st Minister of Planning
- In office 25 September 1961 – 6 February 1963
- President: Gregoire Kayibanda
- Preceded by: Office established
- Succeeded by: Thaddée Bagaragaza

1st Minister of Commerce and Industry
- In office 6 January 1964 – 13 December 1965
- President: Gregoire Kayibanda
- Preceded by: Office established
- Succeeded by: Anastase Makuza

2nd Minister of Public Services
- In office 6 February 1963 – 6 January 1964
- President: Gregoire Kayibanda
- Preceded by: Lazare Mpakaniye
- Succeeded by: Froduald Minani

2nd Minister of Justice
- Interim
- In office 13 February 1963 – 9 September 1963
- President: Gregoire Kayibanda
- Preceded by: Anastase Makuza
- Succeeded by: Callixte Habamenshi

Member of Parliament for Byumba
- In office 25 September 1961 – 29 September 1969

1st President of the National Chamber of Commerce and Industry
- In office 22 November 1973 – 6 February 1982
- Vice President: Balthazar Bicamumpaka
- Preceded by: Office established
- Succeeded by: Marc Hanyurwimfura

Personal details
- Born: May 30, 1930 Rulindo, Ruanda-Urundi
- Died: February 6, 1982 (aged 51)
- Spouse: Agnes Verrycken (m. 1961)
- Children: 3
- Education: Petit Séminaire de Kabgayi
- Alma mater: Grand Séminaire de Nyakibanda (BA); University of Lovanium (MA); University of Antwerp (MFin)

Gaspard Cyimana (May 30, 1930 – February 6, 1982) was a Rwandan statesman, industrialist, economist, and independence leader who served as the first Minister of Finance of Rwanda. He was one of the founding fathers of the Republic of Rwanda and signed both the 1961 Constitution of Rwanda and the subsequent 1962 Constitution of Rwanda. He was a top leader of Rwandan independence from Belgium. Cyimana was a leader of Hutu-Tutsi reconciliation, arguing for the necessity of a multi-ethnic society for Rwanda to be prosperous and economically feasible, and was a signer of the 1960 Entente Between the Tutsi-Hutu Youth of Rwanda. He served as the 1st Minister of Finance, Economic Affairs and Planning of Rwanda from 1960–1968.

He was considered one of the primary leaders and most important political figures of the new nation. Cyimana was the most outspoken critic of nepotism and the lack of qualifications among certain officials within the 1st Republic. He campaigned in parliament for civil examinations, competence tests, and public announcements of all remunerations to government officials as needed reforms. Cyimana served as a Member of Parliament representing Byumba from 1961-1969. He resigned from the cabinet in 1968 as a result of the Guta Umurongo. He was the President of the National Chamber of Commerce and became an entrepreneur for the rest of his life.

== Early life and education ==
A dignified democracy by its own name demands the existence of political parties. A unique party is not conceivable but in a dictatorial regime and that is not our goal. Moreover, no man possesses the monopoly on truth, it is good for those in power from time to time to hear the point of view of others on the way to wage public affairs.

— Gaspard Cyimana (1959)

Gaspard Cyimana was born in Rulindo, Ruanda-Urundi on May 30, 1930 in the province of Byumba.

Cyimana performed well as a student, graduating first in his class at Saint Léon Minor Seminary of Kabgayi. He proceeded to study philosophy at the Grand Seminary of Nyakibanda where his continued academic excellence resulted in him being one of the first Rwandans to study abroad after he received a scholarship. He received his second university degree from the University of Lovanium in the Belgian Congo, studying Political Science and Administrative Studies. The High Council of Rwanda granted Cyimana a 2nd scholarship on behalf of King Mutara III to study finance and economics in Belgium at the University of Antwerp on account of his intellectual brilliance, becoming one of the first Rwandans to study in Europe.

Cyimana became politically active during his studies in Belgium, staying in close contact with intellectuals in Rwanda. In early 1960, he was appointed the representative of Ruanda at the Belgo-Congolese Round Table Conference which negotiated the final terms of Congolese Independence. He finished his studies in 1960 and was appointed Minister of Finance in the provisional government upon his return to Rwanda.

== Career ==
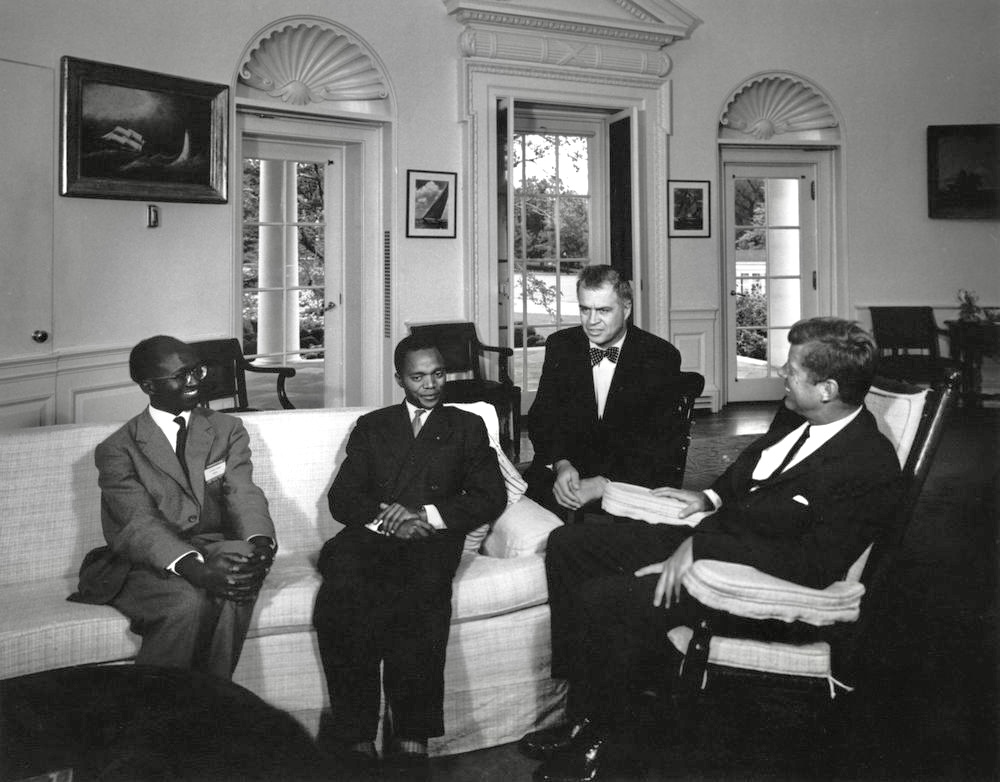
Minister of Finance Gaspard Cyimana and President Gregoire Kayibanda of Rwanda visit United States President John F. Kennedy and Soapy Williams in the Oval Office following Rwanda's admission to the United Nations (1962)

While an economics student in Belgium, Cyimana advocated for independence from Belgium and major reforms of the Rwandan political system. In his two most prominent works, he argued for a more equitable distribution of political power between the three ethnic groups, called for the end of the abuse of commoners by the aristocracy, and proposed a full set of reforms that could preserve the monarchy. He favored democracy as a way to return power to the people and a multiparty system. In the lead up to independence, Cyimana was selected to serve as Minister of Finance in the provisional government and then as the official Minister of Finance in the 1st government. He continued to serve until his resignation in 1968.

During his tenure, Cyimana established the national financial system, the National Bank of Rwanda, the Development Bank of Rwanda, the Bank of Kigali, the Commercial Bank of Rwanda and introduced the Rwandan franc as the national currency.

He entered the private sector following his time as Minister.

== Personal life ==
Cyimana married Agnes Verrycken in Belgium in 1961. They had three children and one grandson.

== Works cited ==
- Nkundabagenzi, Fidele (1961). Rwanda Politique. Bruxelles: Centre de Recherche et d'Information Socio-Politiques.
- Fifty Correspondents of Reuters News Agency (1967). The New Africans: A guide to the contemporary history of emergent Africa and its leaders. London: Paul Hamlyn Ltd.
