= National Institute of Statistics of Rwanda =

Rwanda's principal government institution in charge of statistics and census data

Coordinates: 01°56′29″S 30°03′26″E

- Institut National de la Statistique du Rwanda

Agency overview
- Formed: 2005
- Jurisdiction: Government of Rwanda
- Headquarters: Kigali, Rwanda
- Agency executives: Chairman, Monique Nsanzabaganwa; Director-general, Yusuf Murangwa
- Parent agency: Rwanda Ministry of Finance and Economic Planning
- Website: Homepage

The National Institute of Statistics of Rwanda (NISR; French: Institut National de la Statistique du Rwanda) is a government agency responsible for collecting, analyzing, archiving and disseminating national statistical data, with the objective of aiding the government of Rwanda in making appropriate, timely, evidence-based national decisions.

Prior to September 2005 it was known as the Direction de la Statistique.

== Overview ==
Among its multiple functions is the task of working with the National Census Commission to process the census data, including the validation, tabulation, dissemination and archiving of the final census data. The last national census was conducted in August 2022. The agency also publishes periodic national economic data for Rwanda.

== See also ==
- Economy of Rwanda
- Diane Karusisi
