= Ministry of Finance and Economic Planning (Rwanda) =

Government ministry of Rwanda

- Minisiteri y'Imari n'Igenamigambi; Ministère des Finances et de la Planification économique
- The ministry's building in Kigali

Agency overview
- Formed: 1997
- Preceding agencies: Ministry of Finance; Ministry of Planning
- Jurisdiction: Government of Rwanda
- Headquarters: Nyarugenge, Kigali
- Minister responsible: Yusuf Murangwa, Minister of Finance and Economic Planning
- Deputy Ministers responsible: Godfrey Kabera, Minister of State in charge of the National Treasury; Linda Mutesi Rusagara, Minister of State for Resource Mobilisation and Public Investment
- Child agency: Rwanda Revenue Authority
- Website: www.minecofin.gov.rw

The Ministry of Finance and Economic Planning (MINECOFIN) is the ministry of the Government of Rwanda in charge of public finance and economic planning. It was created in 1997 by merging the Ministry of Finance and the Ministry of Planning.

The ministry prepares the national budget and plans the economic development of the country. Its offices are in the Nyarugenge district of Kigali. Since June 2024, the minister has been Yusuf Murangwa.

== History ==
Memorial to staff of the ministry killed in the 1994 genocide

The first Minister of Finance took office in October 1960. The ministry's Kinyarwanda name is Minisiteri y'Imari n'Igenamigambi. In 1997, it merged with the Ministry of Economic Planning to form MINECOFIN. Since then, the ministry has been located in the Nyarugenge district of Kigali, near the city centre.

In 2018, the ministry published a report on the history of the 1994 genocide against the Tutsi in the former ministries of finance and planning. A memorial at the ministry lists the staff members who were killed.

== Role ==
The ministry prepares and presents the national budget. For example, Minister Murangwa presented the budget for the fiscal year 2025/26 in June 2025. The ministry also manages the National Treasury and leads national economic planning. The Rwanda Revenue Authority is under its supervision.

The minister is assisted by two Ministers of State. One is in charge of the National Treasury. The other is in charge of resource mobilisation and public investment.

== Ministers ==
- Gaspard Cyimana (October 1960 – June 1968)
- Fidèle Nzanana (June 1968 – July 1973)
- Bonaventure Ntibitura (July 1973 – August 1973)
- Jean-Chrysostome Nduhungirehe (August 1973 – June 1975)
- Denys Ntirugirimbabazi (June 1975 – March 1981)
- Jean-Damascene Hategikimana (March 1981 – April 1987)
- Vincent Ruhamanya (April 1987 – January 1989)
- Bénoit Ntigurirwa (January 1989 – December 1991)
- Enoch Ruhigira (December 1991 – April 1992)
- Marc Rugenera (April 1992 – April 1994)
- Emmanuel Ndindabahizi (April 1994 – July 1994)
- Marc Rugenera (1994–1997)
- Jean-Berchmans Birara (1997)
- Donald Kaberuka (1997–2005)
- Manasseh Nshuti (2005–2006)
- James Musoni (2006–2009)
- John Rwangombwa (2009–2013)
- Claver Gatete (2013–2018)
- Uzziel Ndagijimana (2018 – June 2024)
- Yusuf Murangwa (since June 2024)

== See also ==
- Economy of Rwanda
- National Bank of Rwanda
- Cabinet of Rwanda
