= Nshuti =

Nshuti is a surname. Notable people with the surname include:

- Dominique Savio Nshuti (born 1997), Rwandan footballer
- Innocent Nshuti (born 1998), Rwandan footballer
- Manasseh Nshuti (fl. 2003), Rwandan accountant
