= Insurers Committee =

The Insurers Committee is a body consisting of the National Insurance Commission (NAICOM) and chief executive officers of all underwriting Insurance companies in Nigeria. The Committee operates under a mandate to activate the industry's change agenda, and strategically reposition the Insurance industry. The Committee was inaugurated on 19 November 2015, by the then-Minister of Finance Kemi Adeosun.

== Composition ==
The Insurers Committee comprises the Nigerian Insurance Commission (NAICOM), the Nigerian Insurers Association, Nigerian Council of Registered Insurance Brokers, Institute of Loss Adjusters of Nigeria, the Chartered Insurance Institute of Nigeria and the Association of Registered Insurance Agents of Nigeria.

== Scope and focus ==
The Insurers Committee's rebranding programme has its focus on:

- Propagating insurance as the engine that drives key sectors of the economy.
- Showcasing advancements made in efficient service delivery in the insurance industry.
- Providing insurance education to increase the visibility of the sector.
