= Robert K. A. Gardiner =

Ghanaian civil servant, university professor, and economist

- Gardiner in 1962

Commissioner for Economic Planning of Ghana
- In office 14 October 1975 – May 1978
- President: Ignatius Kutu Acheampong

Executive Secretary of the United Nations Economic Commission for Africa
- In office 26 January 1962 – October 1975
- Preceded by: Mekki Abbas
- Succeeded by: Adebayo Adedeji
Ghanaian offices
Establishment Secretary of Ghana
In office 1957–1959
Prime Minister	Kwame Nkrumah
Permanent Secretary of the Ministry of Housing of Ghana
In office 1955–1957
Director of the Department of Social Welfare and Community of the Gold Coast
In office 1953 – 1955
United Nations offices
Officer-in-Charge of the United Nations Operation in the Congo
In office
26 January 1962 – 1 May 1963
Director of the Public Administration Division of the United Nations Department of Economic and Social Affairs
In office
July 1961 – January 1962
Deputy Executive Secretary the United Nations Economic Commission for Africa
In office
May 1959 – August 1960
In office
November 1960 – March 1961

Personal details
- Born: 29 September 1914 Kumasi, Gold Coast
- Died: 13 April 1994 (aged 79) Accra, Ghana
- Spouse: Linda Charlotte Edwards
- Children: 3
- Education: Adisadel College; Fourah Bay College; Selwyn College; University of London; New College

Robert Kweku Atta Gardiner (29 September 1914 – 13 April 1994) was a Ghanaian civil servant, university professor, and economist who served as the Executive Secretary of the United Nations Economic Commission for Africa from January 1962 until October 1975, and as the Commissioner for Economic Planning of Ghana from October 1975 until May 1978.

Gardiner was born in 1914 in Kumasi, Gold Coast, into a family of successful merchants. After attending Adisadel College, he received his education in Sierra Leone and in the United Kingdom. Following the completion of his studies, Gardiner became a professor of economics at Fourah Bay College. From 1946 until 1948 he served as an area specialist for the UN Trusteeship Council. In 1949 he was hired as the first Director of Extramural Studies at University College in Ibadan, Nigeria. Four years later he returned to the Gold Coast to serve in the higher levels of the civil service. Following the country's independence as Ghana in 1957, Gardiner was appointed by Prime Minister Kwame Nkrumah to be Establishment Secretary. The two had a tenuous working relationship as Nkrumah's idealism conflicted with Gardiner's pragmatic style of administration. Following his dismissal in 1959, Gardiner accepted his nomination as Deputy Executive Secretary of the UN Economic Commission for Africa (UNECA). In 1960 civil war erupted in the newly independent Republic of the Congo and Gardiner became heavily involved in UN efforts to resolve the situation, serving as a mediator between various factions and as a close adviser to UN Secretary-General U Thant on the matter.

In January 1962 Gardiner was appointed Executive Secretary of UNECA. In that capacity he oversaw the training of new African experts to staff the organisation and promoted economic development throughout Africa. Following his departure from the UN in 1975 Gardiner returned to Ghana to serve as Commissioner for Economic Planning. He resigned in 1978, his reputation as an economist damaged by the instability of the Ghanaian government. Gardiner then engaged himself in various academic capacities until his declining health forced him to retire. He died in 1994.

== Biography ==
=== Early life and education ===
Robert Kweku Atta Gardiner was born on 29 September 1914 in Kumasi, Gold Coast, into the Fante tribe. His double middle name translated from the Fante dialect means "male twin born on Wednesday". (Note: Gardiner told the British Broadcasting Company that he did not know the origin of his surname.) He was one of eight children of Phillip H.D. Gardiner and Nancy Torraine Ferguson, both successful merchants. His father died when he was two years old, and one of his siblings died before reaching adulthood. Gardiner studied at St. Syprian Anglican School in Kumasi before attending Adisadel College in Cape Coast, where in 1934 he was Head Prefect. That year he won two school prizes for essays he had written. He also attended Fourah Bay College in Freetown, Sierra Leone, and the University of Cambridge's Selwyn College, graduating from the latter in 1941. (Note: Gardiner was elected president of the Junior Common Room at Selwyn, a predecessor to the student union. According to Marika Sherwood, he graduated from the institution with degrees in archaeology and anthropology. According to Misteli, he earned a degree in economics. West Africa stated that he earned second-class honours in the first division of the Economics Tripos. Roberts wrote that Gardiner switched from the economics major to archaeology and anthropology and ultimately graduated with degrees in the latter two.) Gardiner then studied at the University of London and Oxford University's New College. (Note: According to Roberts, Gardiner studied at Oxford and in Nashville, Tennessee.) At the latter he worked under Margery Perham while examining constitutional development in the Gold Coast. (Note: According to Misteli, Gardiner earned his master's degree in economics in 1943. Sherwood stated that he left the school in June 1942 for unexplained reasons.) During this time he became involved with the West African Students' Union and led its study group. In March 1942 he delivered a lecture titled West Africa and the War before the Royal Institute of International Affairs, discussing the relevance of World War II to the African continent. That year the Royal African Society appointed Gardiner to the International Institute of African Languages and Cultures. He also served on the Church of England's Anglo-African committee. He proceeded to the United States to tour American colleges; by March 1943 he had visited 30 institutions. On 24 July of that year he married Linda Charlotte Edwards, a Jamaican painter. (Note: Vieta wrote that Gardiner met Edwards while in the United States. According to The New York Times, the two met in the United Kingdom while Edwards was studying at the University of Reading.) They had two daughters, Charlotte and Roberta, and a son, George.

=== Early career ===
“He was one of the blackest Africans I have ever seen...His expression was wistful, yet purposeful, like that of a man with few illusions but determined not to be got down by his experience...He was the only man who at that stage had a real insight into the political and social structures of the country and who was bold enough to challenge the narrow policy of the university."

— Ulli Beier on Gardiner during his tenure at the University College in Ibadan

After completing his studies, Gardiner secured a position as an economics professor at Fourah Bay College and helped to establish its Department of Commercial and Social Studies. In late 1946 he assisted a British delegation at an international conference on education in Paris. Later that year he was hired by Ralph Bunche to work as an area specialist for the United Nations Trusteeship Council with a focus on West Africa in the Section of Territorial Research and Analysis. Bunche also placed him on the staff of the Special Palestine Commission. He served as an area specialist until 1948. In October 1949 he was made the first Director of Extramural Studies at University College in Ibadan, Nigeria, making him the only African department head at the institution. Under his tenure, the department employed experimental methods to promote and develop its programs, and by 1952 it was determined to be a success. He resigned on 30 September 1953.

Gardiner subsequently joined the Gold Coast Civil Service as the Director of the Department of Social Welfare and Community, becoming the third African to be entrusted with a department in the colony. In that capacity he sought to establish more vocational schools throughout the country. The following year he was made Chairman of the Kumasi College of Technology Council. In 1955 he was made Permanent Secretary of the Ministry of Housing. Following the Gold Coast's independence as Ghana in 1957, Prime Minister Kwame Nkrumah appointed Gardiner Establishment Secretary, making him the head of the Ghana Civil Service. During Gardiner's tenure the two frequently clashed. According to observers, the disagreements between them stemmed from their differing personalities; Gardiner was pragmatic, while Nkrumah was idealistic.

"I'm as much or more interested in Africanisation as any politician. But we have to get the right people. Most of these politicians see no reason why their relatives shouldn't be given jobs. I try to explain that the civil service is not a dumping-ground for party hacks. But many of them fail to see why it shouldn't be."

— Gardiner on Africanisation and political pressures faced by the civil service

Gardiner was often sought by lower level civil servants to shield them from political pressure. He worked to balance demands for Africanisation with professional competence in the bureaucracy. In his capacity as Establishment Secretary, he drafted a protocol that allowed Ghana to manage its own assets housed in British West African organisations until the relevant neighboring colonies could achieve independence. Nevertheless, Nkrumah withdrew Ghana's capital from the groups with the stated purpose of ensuring complete monetary independence from the United Kingdom. In 1958 Gardiner was serving as the Prime Minister's chief of staff. Nkrumah considered dispatching him as high commissioner to Pretoria, South Africa, but the idea was ultimately discarded, in part due to the difficulties in finding Gardiner's children the means to earn an education in the region. Late in his tenure he dismissed his sister from her nursing position for an unexcused extended leave of absence, straining his family ties. He later said, "I had no choice. Her action was clearly contrary to the regulations."

In 1959 Gardiner was dismissed by Nkrumah for unknown reasons. (Note: Le Vine characterised Gardiner's dismissal as part of a "partial purge" of the civil service that left its senior levels "shaken up" and occurred in period of time when the service was subject to increased politicisation. According to West Africa, the Ghanaian Government decided to "release him" so he could take up work at the UN.) In May he accepted a nomination to the post of Deputy Executive Secretary of the UN Economic Commission for Africa (UNECA). By taking the job his political position in Ghana was made neutral, but his overall reputation in the African continent was diminished, as others saw his UN role as an external imposition. Several African states that had close ties with Nkrumah were also unenthusiastic about his discontent with the Prime Minister. Gardiner moved to UNECA's headquarters in Addis Ababa on 17 May, but following the outbreak of civil war in the newly independent Republic of the Congo he was appointed consultant in public administration to the chief of the civilian mission of the UN Operation in the Congo (known under its French acronym as ONUC) in August 1960 and tasked with helping rebuild the Congolese civil service. He faced difficulty in his work because his Ghanaian nationality aroused the suspicions of Congolese President Joseph Kasa-Vubu; the Ghanaian government had offered enthusiastic support to Kasa-Vubu's rival, Prime Minister Patrice Lumumba. Following Lumumba's dismissal in September, Gardiner asked to be replaced. In November he resumed his work at UNECA. In March 1961 he returned to the Congo at the behest of UN Secretary-General Dag Hammarskjöld to lead a Secretariat mission in negotiating a deal concerning the reorganisation of the Congolese Army. On 26 July Gardiner was appointed Director of the Public Administration Division at the UN Department of Economic and Social Affairs, making him the highest ranking African in the UN's staff. While he worked in New York, he also acted as the foremost Congo adviser to Hammarskjöld's successor, U Thant. He played a key role in mediating the negotiations that resulted in the reconvening of the Congolese Parliament and a ceasefire between UN peacekeepers and the armed forces of the secessionist State of Katanga. On 26 January 1962 Gardiner was appointed Officer-in-Charge of ONUC and tasked with managing approximately 400 UN civilian staff. He flew into the Congo on 10 February to assume control of the mission and subsequently garnered significant worldwide media attention in the role. The situation in the Congo deescalated in January 1963 and on 1 May he ended his service.

=== Executive Secretary of UNECA ===
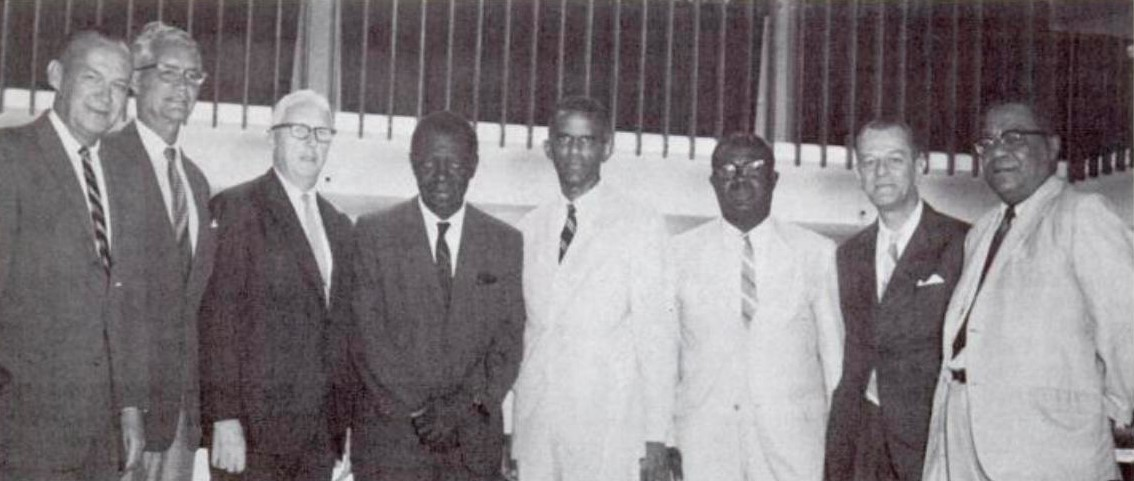
Gardiner (fourth from left) with American diplomats in Accra in April 1967

At the same time as his appointment to ONUC, Gardiner was named Executive Secretary of UNECA, but while he was in the Congo he did not assume any of the responsibilities of the post. Upon his return to Addis Ababa, he worked to guard the organisation from controversies and operate it in a non-partisan manner, circumventing African national and continental political disputes and avoiding the causing of offense to governments. Mindful of the criticism of his predecessor, Mekki Abbas, for being too passive, Gardiner promised that under his management UNECA would take an active role in economic planning and development projects. During his 12 year-tenure in the post, he advocated for the Africanisation of UNECA's staff and the methods it utilised. As he had few resources, his first objectives upon entering office was to improve the commission's data gathering abilities and to acquire qualified personnel. The latter goal was furthered by his establishment of three training paths for African personnel: fellowship awards, seminars and workshops, and education at institutions. The program proved highly successful and by 1968 a total of 1,600 professionals had been trained. As a result, many countries were able to Africanise their statistical and demographic services. He also used the commission to promote smaller regional and subregional economic, research, training, and banking organisations.

"Here we come, I think, to the crux of the misunderstanding that has led to so much rancour and so much bloodshed. For it has been the conviction — conscious and unconscious — of many colonizing powers that on the other side of the confrontation there is nothing. Too often have they failed to recognize that even the poorest people, even those whose way of existence is evidence of a complete inability to meet the challenge that nature poses to man, even people such as these can have their own dignity and can be jealous of it."

— Gardiner in A World of Peoples, 1966

Following the foundation of the Organisation of African Unity (OAU) in 1963, Gardiner appealed to the community for cooperation with UNECA in furthering economic growth. Nevertheless, Gardiner's conservative approach and modest outlook for African development ran contrary to the socialist-leaning idealism of the OAU leadership, and the resulting rivalry between UNECA and OAU undermined inter-organisational coordination and the technical capability of the latter for years. In April–May 1967 Gardiner attended the Accra Conference that resulted in the eventual foundation of the Economic Community of West African States. He presented the Articles of Association to the conference for signature and advised that the smaller West African states should attempt to integrate sections of their markets to open themselves up to a wider array of economic activities. Gardiner strongly endorsed the construction of a Lagos–Mombasa Highway, and on 1 July 1971 he established the Trans-African Highway Bureau to oversee the development of a continental road network. He also played a key role in convincing states to sign the African Economic Charter in 1973. Partly due to his efforts to promote regional economic organisations, Ghana mollified its resistance towards West African integration in the 1970s.

After being approached by the British Broadcasting Corporation, Gardiner agreed to become the first African to deliver the Reith Lectures. Entitled A World of Peoples, his six broadcasts in 1965 discussed race relations. The following year he published a book under the same name. He also delivered the Gilbert Murray Memorial Lectures in 1969, the J. B. Danquah Memorial Lectures in 1970, and the Aggrey-Fraser-Guggisberg Memorial Lectures in 1972. In 1969 Ghanaian Prime Minister Kofi Abrefa Busia offered him the office of Secretary of the Presidential Commission and Council of State. Gardiner subsequently wrote a letter of resignation to Thant and made preparations to return to Accra. Meanwhile, members of Busia's cabinet led by Foreign Minister Victor Owusu insisted that Gardiner not be given the post, objecting to Busia's ostensible intentions to "groom" him to be the next President of Ghana. Busia relented and sent a letter to Thant expressing his government's wish that Gardiner remain at the UN. When Gardiner was informed of the decision he was deeply embarrassed and kept his post. In October 1972 he was dispatched to Uganda by the UN Secretary-General where he attempted in vain to convince President Idi Amin to halt the expulsion of Asian minorities from the country. While at UNECA he served as a mentor to fellow Ghanaian and future UN Secretary-General Kofi Annan.

==== Concurrent academic and advisory activities ====
Following the unanimous approval of the governments of the Commonwealth of Nations, Gardiner was appointed Chairman of the Commonwealth Foundation, serving from 1970 until 1973. He was a visiting professor of economics at the University of Strathclyde from 1970 until 1975. He was also a visiting professor of economics and senior consultant to the newly established Centre for Development Studies at the University of Cape Coast from 1974 until 1977 and the chairman of the Board of Directors of the Post and Telecommunications Corporation. Later he was a fellow of Selwyn College, the Ghana Academy of Arts and Sciences, and the Ghana Institute of Management and Public Administration. Between 1970 and 1975 Gardiner was variously a member of the Advisory Committee of the Council on World Tensions, the Council for Scientific and Industrial Research of Ghana, the Third World Foundation, and the UN Development Planning Committee. Gardiner also served as trustee or board member for the Dag Hammarskjöld Foundation, the International Institute of Tropical Agriculture, and the Third World Prize Selection Committee, and sponsored Minority Rights Group International.

=== Return to Ghana ===
In October 1975 Gardiner left UNECA and returned to Ghana. (Note: Legum stated that Gardiner retired after reaching the maximum age of service for the post. As of 2018 he held the record for longest service at UNECA among Ghanaian officials.) On 14 October he was appointed Commissioner for Economic Planning for the Supreme Military Council. Two years later the government dispatched him to Nairobi in an attempt to improve relations between Kenya, Tanzania, and Uganda and salvage the financially troubled East African Railways and Harbours Corporation. He also personally involved himself in anti-corruption efforts in the port of Takoradi. He resigned in May 1978, citing concern for his health. According to Africa Confidential, there were rumours that Gardiner had resigned in an attempt to distance himself from Ignatius Kutu Acheampong's economically unstable regime. (Note: Africa Confidential also noted that, in spite of ostensible health concerns, Gardiner "was seen looking fit at the Pugwash Conference at Cape Coast in May.") His reputation as an economist was nevertheless tarnished. Afterwards he served a term as the Chairman of the Council of the University of Science and Technology (successor to the Kumasi College of Technology) and edited the African Development Bank's 20th anniversary book, African Development Bank : 1964–1984, until his declining health forced him into retirement. Gardiner died early in the morning on 13 April 1994 in Accra, Ghana, survived by his wife and children.

== Beliefs and personality ==
"A warm, emotional and intensely human father-figure, whose tolerance and idealism are expressed with a gentle persuasiveness which seems almost out of place in today's bustling and violent world."

— John Dickie and Alan Rake on Gardiner, 1973

In comparison to his Ghanaian contemporaries, Gardiner was a conservative. He believed that political and economic issues of transformation could be separated and strongly supported a capitalist model of development. He thought increased productivity and higher wages would boost Ghana's economy, and believed that the persistence of a trade deficit would contribute to inflation and national financial difficulties. He expressed that improved transport and communication systems and rural education and health services as well as land redistribution, participation in global trade, and expanded job opportunity would contribute to development in Africa. Gardiner also thought that African aid models were too reliant on foreign assistance and that such assistance should only be used to augment local development efforts. He advocated for the normalisation of relations between African states and the white minority government of South Africa, believing the former could benefit from the economic strength of the latter.

Evaluations of Gardiner generally perceive him to be politically moderate and primarily an international civil servant, rather than a political figure. His successor at the UNECA Secretariat, Adebayo Adedeji, felt he lacked a creative outlook, saying of him, "Robert Gardiner was a conservative economist who didn't see anything wrong with the extant development paradigm."

Gardiner was quiet and reserved in nature. His two favorite sayings were "complacency breeds arrogance" and "one's job can never be finished". He enjoyed walking, golfing, reading, and listening to music.

== Honours ==
"Robert Gardiner is a great son of Africa—and of the world. In his long and distinguished career he contributed in many ways—as an academic, as a writer, as a national and international civil servant and as a government Minister."

— Shridath Ramphal, 1989

Gardiner was awarded nine honorary degrees from universities in the United States, United Kingdom, and Ghana over the course of his life. Donald Robinson included him in his 1970 book, The 100 Most Important People in the World Today. At the opening session of the International Conference for the Study of the Problem of Developing Countries in 1975 he was awarded a gold medal by Italian President Giovanni Leone in recognition for his contributions to Africa. In March 1978 Gardiner was inducted into the Order of the Volta with companion insignia for his service as Commissioner for Economic Planning. A collection of essays published in 1990 was dedicated to him. In 2000 Annan stated that Gardiner was one of "[Ghana's] great figures of the past". In 2024, the Ghana Association of Former International Civil Servants published a book, Series on Some Outstanding Ghanaians, Volume 1, which profiled several Ghanaians including Gardiner.
