= Claver Gatete =

Rwandan politician

Ambassador Claver Gatete
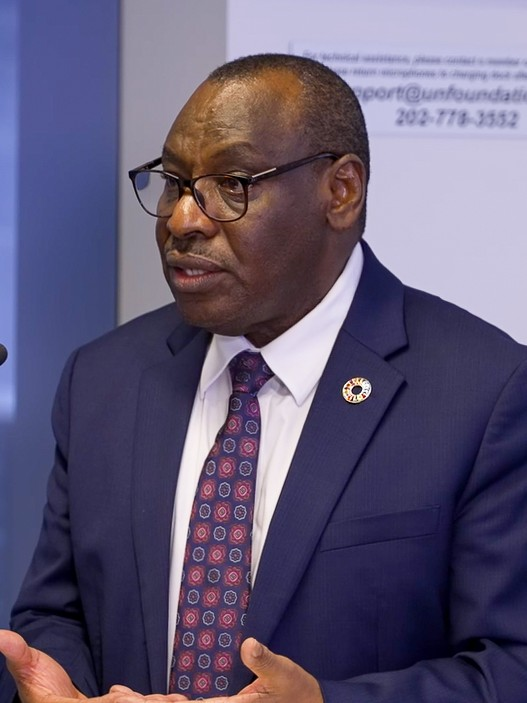

Executive Secretary, United Nations Economic Commission for Africa
- Incumbent
- Assumed office 6 October 2023
- Appointed by: António Guterres
- Preceded by: Vera Songwe

Permanent Representative of Rwanda to the United Nations
- In office 28 March 2022 – 6 October 2023
- Preceded by: Valentine Rugwabiza

Minister of Infrastructure
- In office 6 April 2018 – 28 March 2022
- President: Paul Kagame
- Preceded by: Musoni James
- Succeeded by: Ernest Nsabimana

Minister of Finance and Economic Planning
- In office 26 February 2013 – 6 April 2018
- Succeeded by: Uzziel Ndagijimana

Personal details
- Born: 23 May 1962 (age 64) Mbarara, Uganda
- Citizenship: Rwandan
- Education: University of British Columbia (BSc, MSc)
- Occupation: Politician
- Profession: Economist
- Cabinet: Cabinet of Rwanda
- Portfolio: Infrastructure

Claver Gatete (born 23 May 1962) is a Rwandan politician and diplomat who has been serving as the Executive Secretary of the United Nations Economic Commission for Africa since 2023.

From 2022 to 2023, Gatete was Rwanda's Permanent Representative to the United Nations. He previously served as the Minister of Infrastructure in the Rwandan cabinet. Prior to his Cabinet appointment in April 2018, he served as Minister of Finance and Economic Planning from 2013 to 2018. He has previously served as the governor of the National Bank of Rwanda and as Rwanda's ambassador to the United Kingdom, Ireland, and Iceland.

== Early life and education ==
Claver Gatete was born in Mbarara, Uganda, on 23 May 1962, where he was raised and educated.

He studied Agricultural Economics at the University of British Columbia, Vancouver, and was awarded a Bachelor of Science in 1991. His Master of Science, also in Agricultural Economics, was awarded in 1993, by the same university.

== Career ==
Upon the completion of his university studies, Gatete worked in Canada as an economist between 1991 and 1997, and then worked as the national economist with the United Nations Development Programme in Rwanda until 2000.

In October 2001, Gatete joined the office of the president as the president's personal representative to NEPAD's Steering Committee. He concurrently served as the Coordinator of the National African Peer Review Mechanism (APRM) and as a Member of the NEPAD's African Partnership Forum (APF), until November 2003.

For a period of two years, from November 2003 until November 2005, he served as the Secretary to the Treasury, in the Finance and Economic Planning ministry.

From November 2005 until December 2009, Gatete was Rwanda's ambassador to the UK, Ireland and Iceland, before joining the National Bank of Rwanda as the deputy governor. He then served as the governor of the National Bank of Rwanda from May 2011, before his appointment as the Minister of Finance.

He was appointed Minister of Infrastructure in April 2018, replacing James Musoni. He was replaced as Minister of Finance of Rwanda by Uzziel Ndagijimana.

On 6 October 2023, UN Secretary-General António Guterres appointed Gatete as the Executive Secretary of the United Nations Economic Commission for Africa.

From 2013-2018 he was Ex-Officio Member of the Board of Governors African Development Bank (AfDB).

== See also ==
- Cabinet of Rwanda

== Film appearance ==
- Motherland film (2010)
