= Co-operative Bank Rwanda =

Bank of Rwanda

- Company type: Cooperative bank
- Industry: Financial services
- Founded: 2025 (expected)
- Headquarters: Kigali, Rwanda
- Products: Loans, Savings, Investments
- Services: Support the Umurenge Saccos

Co-operative Bank Rwanda or Rwanda Co-operative Bank is a proposed commercial bank in Rwanda. It is expected to broaden "financial inclusion" in the country, working through the regional Savings and Credit Cooperatives (Umurenge SACCOs) and increasing financial services in rural areas.

== History ==
In July 2014, approximately 2,500 members of the Rwanda Cooperative Agency (RCA) met Paul Kagame, the President of Rwanda during an event called “Meet The President”. At that event, held in Kigali, the country's capital city, the president instructed the minister of trade and industry to establish a cooperative bank, in the shortest time possible. It was expected to be launched in 2018 but this did not happen.

Under guidelines by the National Bank of Rwanda, the minimum capital required is Rwf5 billion (US$6 million). There are approximately 8,000 cooperatives (community cooperatives) in Rwanda, according to the RCA. The cooperatives are prepared to provide 60% of the needed start up capital.

Also, there are an estimated 480 Saving and Credit Cooperatives, (Umurenge SACCOs) in the country. These Saccos are being courted to provide the remaining 40% of the required start-up capital. Also, the Saccos need to be linked to a common computer system, in order to serve as branches of the proposed bank. When the bank becomes operational in 2018, as expected, its lending rates are planned to be lower than the commercial banks.

In June 2024, the Umerenge SACCOs completed automation paving the way for the creation of the Co-operative Bank Rwanda, which had not yet launched.

== Ownership ==
While the ownership details are being worked out, the owners will include (a) Unmurenge Saccos (b) other Rwanda cooperatives (c) other Rwanda entities. The Rwanda government requires that all shareholders in the bank be Rwandan.

== Branches ==
It is expected that some of the offices of the 480 Saccos in the country will become branches of the proposed bank, after the completion of computerization and linking of their operations.

== See also ==
- National Bank of Rwanda
- List of banks in Rwanda
