= John Rwangombwa =

Rwandan accountant, politician and banker

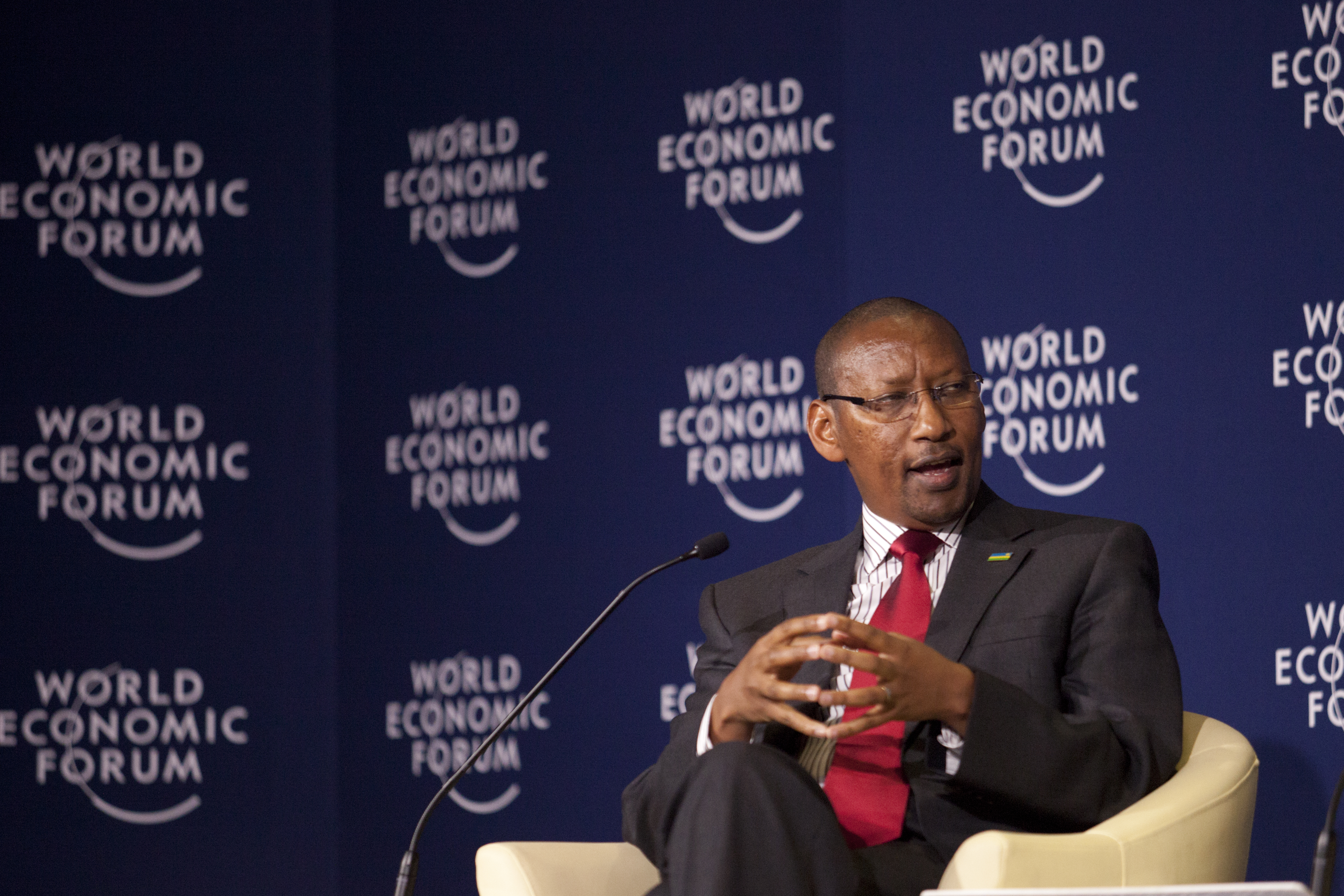
- John Rwangombwa at the World Economic Forum on Africa, 2012
- Citizenship: Rwanda
- Education: Makerere University (Bachelor of Commerce); Maastricht School of Management (Master of Business Administration)
- Occupations: Accountant and Central Bank Governor
- Title: Governor of the National Bank of Rwanda

John Rwangombwa is a Rwandan accountant, politician and banker. He is the former governor of the National Bank of Rwanda, the central bank and national banking regulator. He held that position from 25 February 2013 until February 25, 2025.

== Background and education ==
Rangombwa studied at Makerere University, in Kampala, Uganda, graduating with a Bachelor of Commerce, majoring in accounting. He also holds a Master of Business Administration, specializing in accounting, from the Maastricht School of Management in the Netherlands.

== Career ==
Rangombwa started at Rwanda Revenue Authority where he ascended to the rank of Deputy Commissioner of Customs for Operations, serving in that capacity from June 1998 until February 2002. He joined the Ministry of Finance and Economic Planning in 2002 as the Director of the National Treasury Department. In 2005, he served as the first Accountant General in the ministry. Later that year, he was appointed Permanent Secretary and Secretary to the Treasury. In 2009 he became the Minister of Finance and Economic Planning.

On 25 February 2013, Rangombwa was appointed Governor of the National Bank of Rwanda, the country's central bank. In this capacity, he oversees the modernization of the bank's monetary policy framework, by targeting inflation and abandoning the targeting of monetary aggregate, in anticipation of the creation of the East African Currency Union. In 2019, Rwanda's cabinet approved an extension of six years to Rwangombwa's term of as governor.

== Other responsibilities ==
- Presidential Advisory Council, Member
- World Economic Forum, Member of the Global Agenda Council
- International Monetary Fund (IMF), Ex-Officio Alternate Member of the Board of Governors (since 2013)
- East African Development Bank, Member of the Board of Governors (2008-2013)

== See also ==
- List of banks in Rwanda
- Economy of Rwanda
- Rwandan franc
- Monique Nsanzabaganwa
