= Erastus J. O. Mwencha =

Kenyan diplomat

Erastus Mwencha
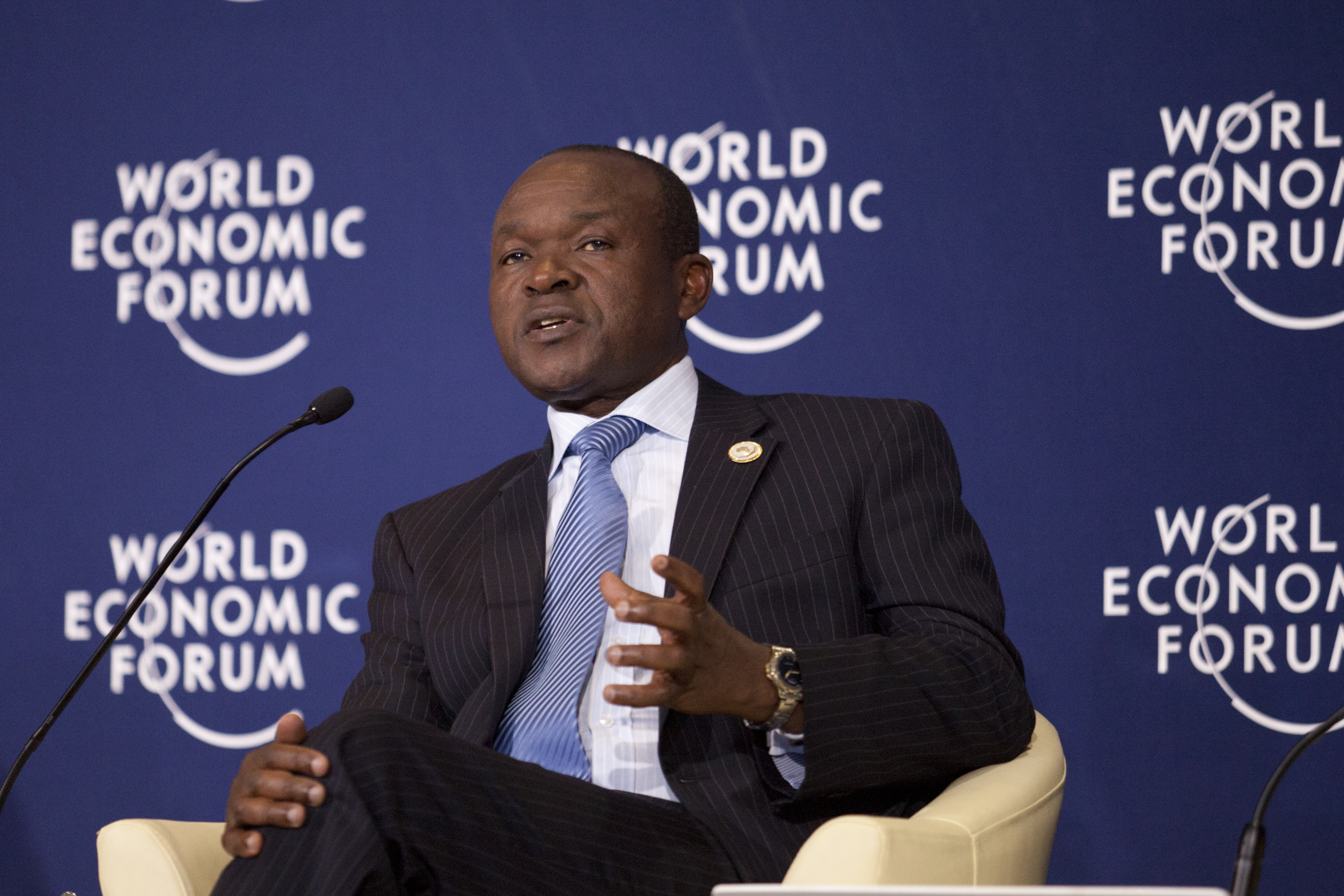
- Mwencha at the World Economic Forum on Africa in 2012

Personal details
- Born: 15 November 1947 (age 78) Kisii, Kenya
- Education: University of Nairobi; York University

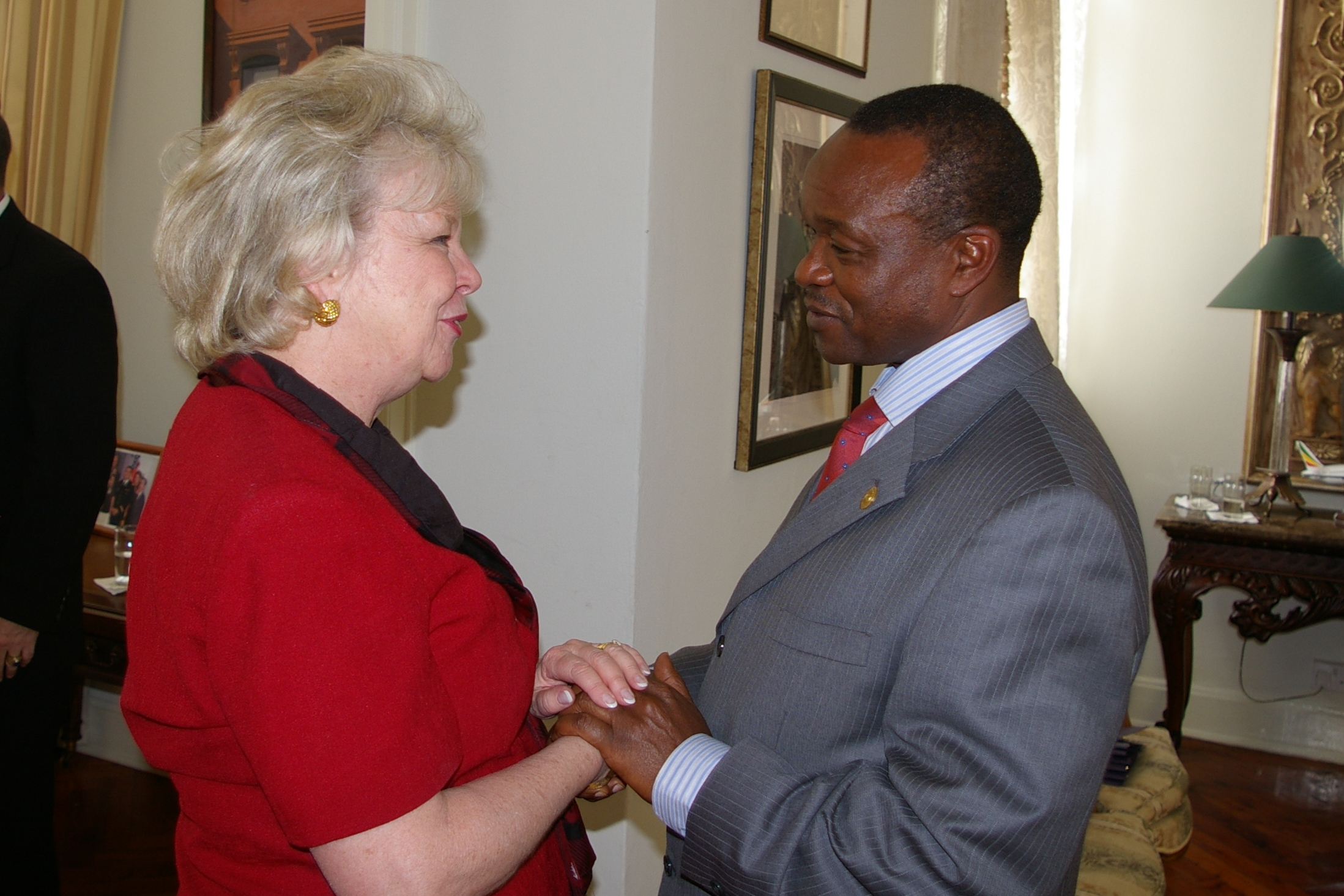
Erastus Mwencha with Mary Yates, AFRICOM March 2009

Erastus J.O. Mwencha (November 15, 1947) is a Kenyan businessman who served as a Secretary-General of the Common Market for Eastern and Southern Africa and former Deputy Chairperson of the African Union Commission, to which he was elected on February 6, 2008. On January 30, 2017, he was succeeded as Deputy Chairperson of the AU Commission by Ghana diplomat Thomas Kwasi Quartey.

== Personal life ==
He is married with three children.

== Honors ==
- Order of the Rising Sun, 2nd Class, Gold and Silver Star (2020)
