= Manasseh Nshuti =

Rwandan politician

Minister of State for Foreign Affairs, Regional Cooperation and EAC affairs
- In office May 2020 – September 2023
- Prime Minister: Édouard Ngirente
- Preceded by: Olivier Nduhungirehe
- Succeeded by: James Kabarebe

Minister of Finance
- In office 2005–2006
- Prime Minister: Bernard Makuza
- Preceded by: Donald Kaberuka
- Succeeded by: James Musoni

Personal details
- Born: 1956 (age 69–70)
- Citizenship: Rwanda
- Education: Makerere University; University of Aberdeen
- Occupation: Academic; politician

Manasseh Nshuti is a Rwandan accountant, businessman, academic and politician. He served as Minister of State for East African Community Affairs in the Rwandan Cabinet from May 2020 to September 2023. He previously sat as the Chairman of University of Kigali (2013–2020).

== Early life and education ==
Nshuti holds a Bachelor of Commerce from Makerere University, in Uganda. His second degree, a Master of Business Administration, in Accounting, was awarded by the University of Aberdeen, in Scotland. He also holds a Doctor of Philosophy degree in Finance, obtained from the University of Aberdeen as well.

From 2013 until 2020, Nshuti served as the Chairman of the University of Kigali, a private university that he helped found.

== Career ==
Nshuti lectured at Strathmore University in Nairobi, Kenya for fourteen years. Spent lecturing and administering at the Catholic University of Eastern Africa, also in Nairobi, Kenya. He also lectured at the University of Aberdeen for two years, while pursuing his doctoral degree.

=== Political career ===
Nshuti first served in the Cabinet of Rwanda from 2003 until 2005, as the Minister of Commerce, Industry, Investment Promotion, Tourism and Cooperatives. He was transferred to the Ministry of Finance in 2005, to replace Donald Kaberuka, who was appointed President of the African Development Bank.

In 2006, he was appointed Minister of Public Service and Labor, serving there until 2008, when he was named as Senior Economic Advisor to the President of Rwanda. For a period, between 2008 and 2013, Nshuti served as Chairman of Crystal Ventures Limited, the business arm of the Rwandan military.

In May 2020, he took over the East African Community portfolio, replacing Olivier Nduhungirehe, who was fired from cabinet, on 10 April 2020, for "fronting his personal opinions before government policies..". It is his responsibility to lead efforts to restore normal relations with neighboring Uganda, which have deteriorated of the past two to three years.
