= Uzziel Ndagijimana =

Rwandan economist

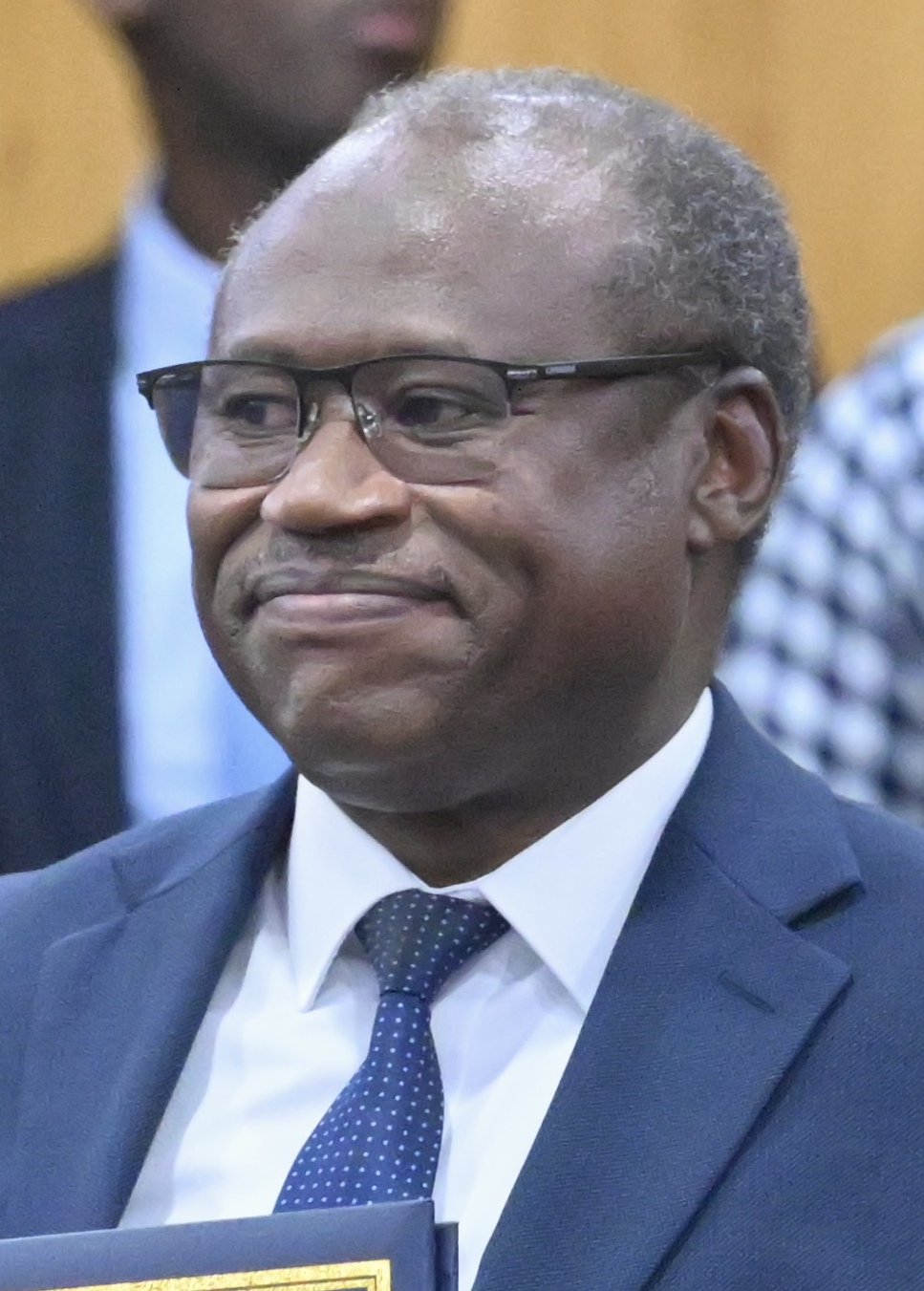
- Uzziel Ndagijimana in 2023

Group CEO of Bank of Kigali Group
- In office 6 April 2018 – 15 August 2024
- President: Paul Kagame
- Preceded by: Claver Gatete
- Succeeded by: Yusuf Murangwa

Chairman of the board of Afreximbank

Uzziel Ndagijimana is a Rwandan economist who served as Minister of Finance and Economic Planning in the government of President Paul Kagame from 2018 to 2024 and was replaced by Yusuf Murangwa.

== Early life and education ==
Ndagijimana holds a PhD, Economics, 1998 from University of Warsaw and MSc. Economics from Warsaw School of Economics.

== Career ==
Ndagijimana started his career as a lecturer in the faculty of Economics, Social Sciences, and Management at the National University of Rwanda in 1999. In 2002, he moved to leadership positions of the Government of Rwanda.

Ndagijimana served as the Rector of School of Finance and Banking in Kigali, Rwanda, from 2002 to 2007 after which he moved on to be the Vice Rector of the National University of Rwanda from 2007 to 2011.

Ndagijimana was the Permanent Secretary of the Ministry of Health, Republic of Rwanda, from May 2011 to July 2014. He was also the Minister of State in charge of Economic Planning in the Ministry of Finance and Economic Planning (MINECOFIN).

During the annual general meeting of Afreximbank in Abuja to commemorate its 25th anniversary, Kemi Adeosun, Nigeria's finance minister, succeeded Ndagijimana as chairman of the board of the bank.

On April 7, 2018, Ndagijimana was appointed Rwanda's Minister of Finance and Economic Planning by President Paul Kagame. Ndagijimana also served as Chairman of Economic Advisory Council of the President of the Republic of Rwanda.

== Other activities ==
- African Development Bank (AfDB), Ex-Officio Member of the Board of Governors (since 2018)
- East African Development Bank (EADB), Ex-Officio Member of the Governing Council (since 2018)
- International Monetary Fund (IMF), Ex-Officio Member of the Board of Governors (since 2018)
- World Bank, Ex-Officio Member of the Board of Governors (since 2018)
- National University of Rwanda, Member of the Board of Directors
- National Bank of Rwanda, Member of the Board of Directors
