= Zainab Ahmed =

Nigerian politician and accountant (born 1960)

Zainab Ahmed CON
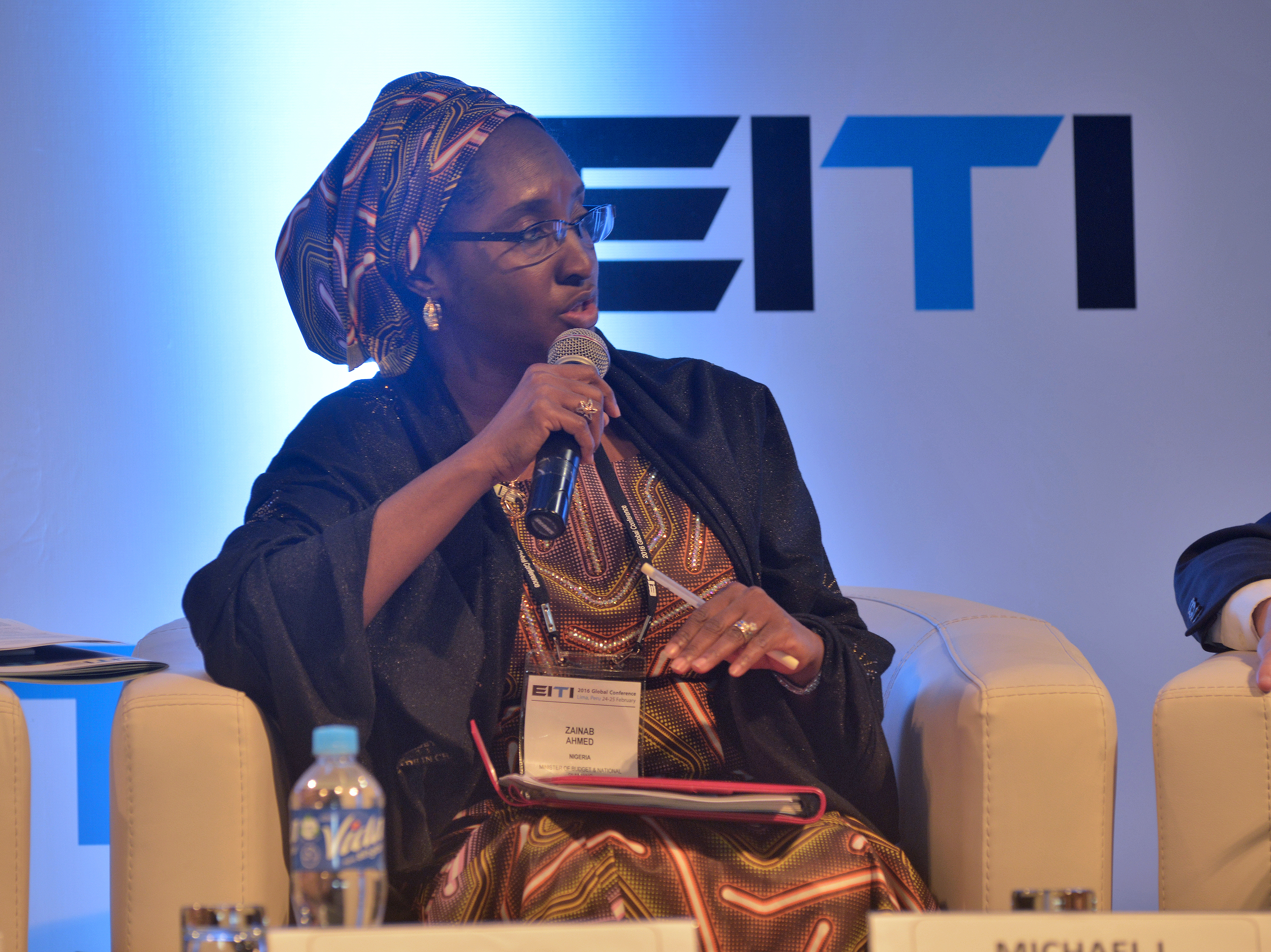

Minister of Finance, Budget and National Planning
- In office 21 August 2019 – 29 May 2023
- President: Muhammadu Buhari
- Minister of State: Clement Agba
- Preceded by: Herself (as Minister of Finance); Udoma Udo Udoma (as Minister of Budget and National Planning)
- Succeeded by: Wale Edun (as Minister of Finance); Abubakar Atiku Bagudu (as Minister of Budget and Economic Planning)

Minister of Finance
- In office 14 September 2018 – 28 May 2019
- President: Muhammadu Buhari
- Preceded by: Kemi Adeosun
- Succeeded by: Herself (as Minister of Finance, Budget and National Planning)

Minister of State for Budget and National Planning
- In office 11 November 2015 – 14 September 2018
- President: Muhammadu Buhari
- Minister: Udoma Udo Udoma
- Succeeded by: Clement Agba

Personal details
- Born: 16 June 1960 (age 66)
- Party: All Progressives Congress
- Education: Ahmadu Bello University; Olabisi Onabanjo University
- Occupation: Politician; accountant

Zainab Shamsuna Ahmed CON (born 16 June 1960) is a Nigerian accountant and politician who served as the minister of Finance, Budget and National Planning of Nigeria from 2019 to 2023. She previously served as the minister of finance from 2018 to 2019, and as the minister of State for Budget and National Planning from 2015 to 2018. In 2019, President Muhammadu Buhari brought the two ministries under her as one, making her the minister of the Economy.

An accountant by profession with a Bachelor of Science degree in accounting from ABU Zaria and a Master's in Business Administration (MBA), Ahmed was appointed Finance Minister upon the resignation of the previous minister Kemi Adeosun on 14 September 2018. She was appointed by the President of Nigeria in 2010, the Managing Director Kaduna Investment Company Ltd.

== Early life and education ==
Ahmed was born in Kaduna State. She had her secondary school education at Queen Amina College, Kaduna, and later proceeded to have her A'Level in Zaria. She got her first degree in Accounting from Ahmadu Bello University in 1981, after-which she proceeded to Olabisi Onabanjo University for her MBA.

Ahmed's MBA was obtained in August 2004 from the Ogun State University, Ago Iwoye; while her BSc Accounting (1981) was from Ahmadu Bello University (ABU), Zaria; IJMB ‘A’ Levels (1979) from SBS/ABU Zaria; and WASC ‘O’ Level in 1977 from Queen Amina College, Kaduna.

Ahmed holds fellowship status with the Association of National Accountants of Nigeria (ANAN) and is affiliated with both the Nigerian Institute of Taxation and the Nigerian Institute of Management.

Mrs. Zainab Ahmed serves as an ex-officio member on the ICRC Governing Board.

== Political career ==
Ahmed was the Minister of Finance, Budget and National Planning of the Federal Republic of Nigeria, during the then president Muhammadu Buhari.

Ahmed was the immediate past executive secretary and national coordinator of the Nigeria Extractive Industries Transparency Initiative (NEITI). She was also a member of the last two NEITI boards, having worked in the NEITI and global EITI.

Upon graduation, Ahmed was employed in 1982 as an Accountant II in the Main Accounts of Ministry of Finance in Kaduna State and was promoted to Accountant I in March 1984, but resigned in 1985 to join NITEL. Earlier, she had done her National Youth Service in Kaduna State in 1981/1982 where she was posted for primary assignment to Messrs. Egunjobi Suleiman & Co. Chartered Accountants, and served as an Audit Trainee.

Ahmed has served the Nigerian public in various high ranking positions, including as managing director of the Kaduna State of Nigeria's investment company, and also the Chief Finance Officer of the Nigeria mobile telecommunications company. Zainab was reappointed and sworn in as the Minister of Finance on 21 August 2019 by the President.

== Other activities ==
- African Development Bank (AfDB), Ex-Officio Member of the Board of Governors (since 2018)
- ECOWAS Bank for Investment and Development (EBID), Ex-Officio Member of the Board of Governors (since 2018)
- International Monetary Fund (IMF), Ex-Officio Member of the Board of Governors (since 2018)
- Islamic Development Bank, Ex-Officio Member of the Board of Governors (since 2018)
- World Bank, Ex-Officio Member of the Board of Governors (since 2018)

== Award ==
In October 2022, a Nigerian national honour of Commander of the Order of the Niger (CON) was conferred on her by President Muhammadu Buhari.

== See also ==
- Cabinet of Nigeria
- Finance Minister of Nigeria
