= Selma Haddadi =

Algerian diplomat

Selma Malika Haddadi
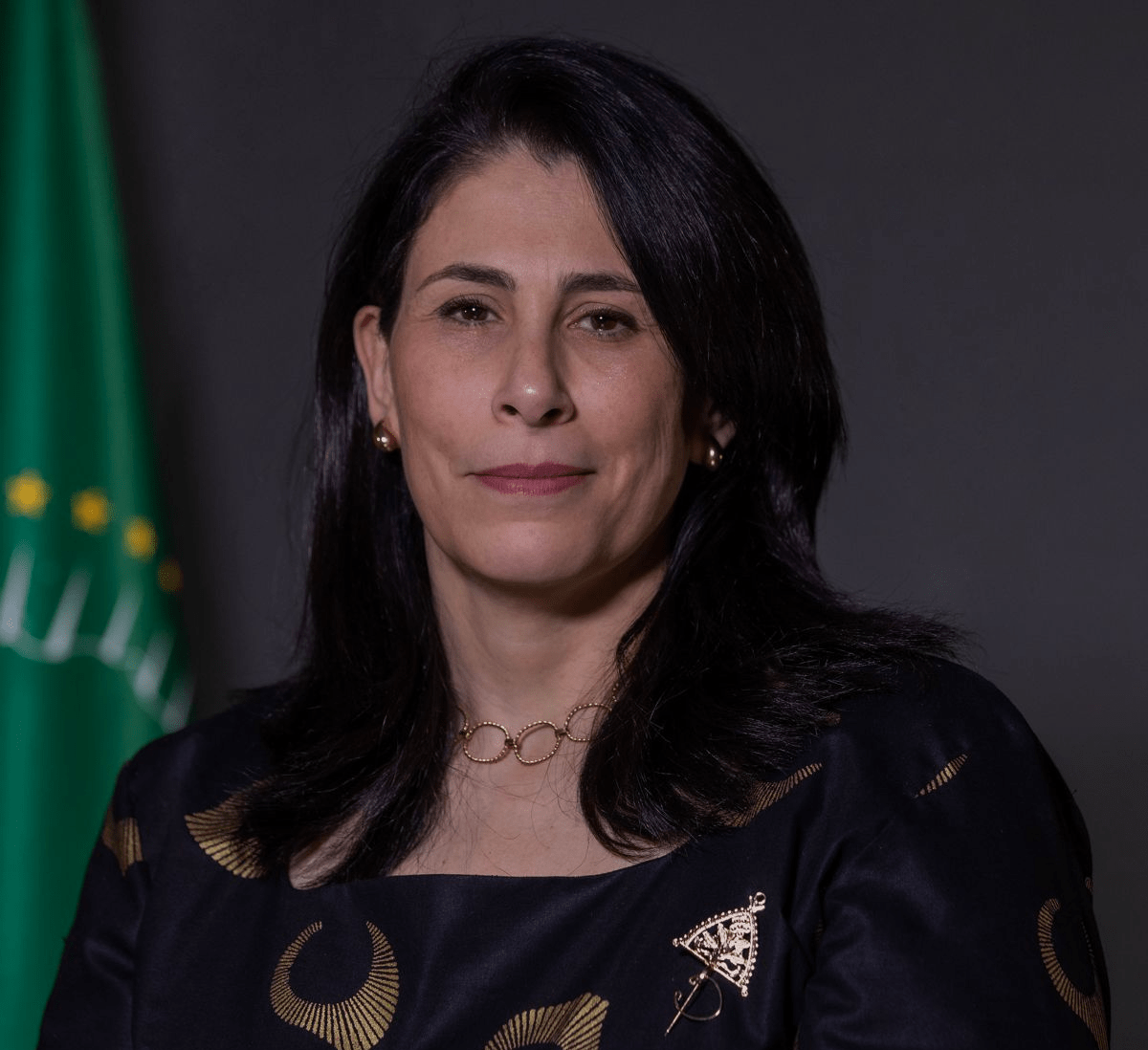
- Haddadi in Addis Ababa in 2025
- Born: 1977 (age 48–49); Algeria
- Occupation: Diplomat

Selma Malika Haddadi (born 1977) is an Algerian diplomat who has served as Deputy Chairperson of the African Union Commission since 15 February 2025. She succeeded Monique Nsanzabaganwa in the position.

== Early life and education ==
Haddadi studied law and was sworn in as a lawyer at the Algiers Bar in 2002.

She holds a master's degree in private law from the University of Nantes and a master's degree in public and private international law from the University of Nice Sophia Antipolis.

== Career ==
Haddadi served at Algeria's Permanent Mission to the United Nations in Geneva, where she worked on multilateral and political affairs.

She later held several senior positions within Algeria's Ministry of Foreign Affairs, including responsibilities related to refugees, social development and African affairs. In 2023, she was appointed Director General for Africa at the ministry.

From 2015 to 2019, Ambassador Haddadi served as Minister Counsellor and Deputy Head of Mission at the Embassy of Algeria in Ethiopia and to the African Union.

From 2019 to 2023, she served as Algeria's ambassador to Kenya and South Sudan. She was Algeria's first ambassador accredited to South Sudan following the establishment of diplomatic relations between the two countries.

In 2024, Haddadi became Algeria's ambassador to Ethiopia and permanent representative to the African Union and the United Nations Economic Commission for Africa.

== Deputy Chairperson of the African Union Commission ==
On 15 February 2025, Haddadi was elected Deputy Chairperson of the African Union Commission during the 38th Ordinary Session of the Assembly of Heads of State and Government held in Addis Ababa.

In April 2026, Ambassador Haddadi led the African Union delegation to the World Bank Group Spring Meetings in Washington, D.C.

== Public positions and writings ==
Haddadi has spoken on issues related to African multilateralism and representation in international institutions.

In 2026, she co-authored with economist Carlos Lopes an opinion article in Project Syndicate titled Cartographic Justice for Africa.

The article discussed the effects of historical map projections on representations of Africa in educational and public materials. The publication was associated with broader discussions referred to as "Correct the Map", concerning cartographic representations of the African continent.
