= Emmanuel Ndindabahizi =

Rwandan politician (c. 1950–2025)

Ministry of Finance and Economic Planning of Rwanda
- In office 8 April 1994 – 14 July 1994
- Preceded by: Marc Rugenera
- Succeeded by: Marc Rugenera

Personal details
- Born: 1950 Gitesi, Ruanda-Urundi (now in Rwanda)
- Died: 5 October 2025 (aged 74–75) Cotonou, Benin
- Criminal charges: Genocide; Extermination as a crime against humanity; Murder as a crime against humanity; Complicity in genocide (dropped before trial); Rape as a crime against humanity (dropped before trial)
- Criminal penalty: Life imprisonment
- Criminal status: Deceased

Emmanuel Ndindabahizi (1950 – 5 October 2025) was a Rwandan politician. He served as the Rwandan Minister of Finance in 1994. He was sentenced to life in prison following his conviction for crimes related to the Rwanda Genocide.

== Life and career ==
Ndindabahizi, born 1950 in Gitesi, Kibuye (then part of Belgian-controlled Ruanda-Urundi) was the minister of finance between 8 April 1994 – 14 July 1994.

In 5 July 2001 Ndindabahizi was charged with five counts: Genocide, complicity in genocide, murder as a crime against humanity, extermination as a crime against humanity, and rape as a crime against humanity. He was arrested two days later in Belgium and held at the International Criminal Tribunal for Rwanda (ICTR) Detention Facility. On 19 October, he pled not guilty to all counts.

Ndindabahizi's trial began on 1 September 2003, lasting twenty-seven trial days. On 3 September, his indictment was amended to drop the charges of rape and complicity in genocide, to which he again pleaded not guilty. The prosecution was led by Charles A. Adeogun-Phillips, Kapaya Wallace, and Peter Tafah. In 2004, the ICTR sentenced him to life imprisonment for his part in the Rwandan Genocide, alleging that he had ordered the murder of thousand of Tutsi refugees hiding out in Gitwa Hill, going so far as arming Hutu attackers with machetes and grenades. His appeal was denied in January 2007.

Ndindabahizi (along with eight other inmates) was transferred to a prison in Benin on 27 June 2009 to serve the remained of his sentence. He died while imprisoned in Cotonou on 5 October 2025.
