= Donald Kaberuka =

Rwandan economist

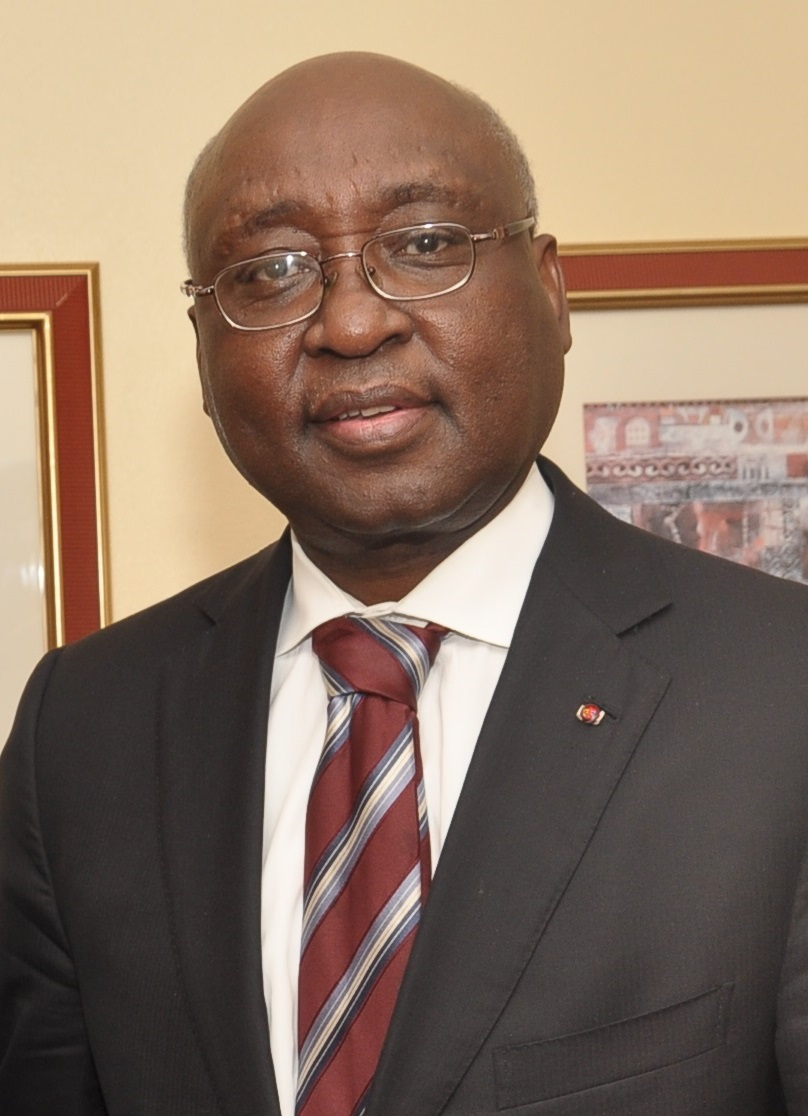

7th President of the African Development Bank
- In office 1 September 2005 – 1 September 2015
- Preceded by: Omar Kabbaj
- Succeeded by: Akinwumi Adesina

Minister of Finance and Economic Planning
- In office 7 October 1997 – 20 August 2005
- Prime Minister: Pierre-Célestin Rwigema; Bernard Makuza
- Preceded by: Jean-Berchmans Birara
- Succeeded by: Manasseh Nshuti

Personal details
- Born: 5 October 1951 (age 74) Byumba, Rwanda
- Education: University of Dar es Salaam (BA); University of East Anglia (MPhil); University of Glasgow (PhD)

Donald P. Kaberuka (born 5 October 1951) is a Rwandan economist and was the president of the African Development Bank from September 2005 until September 2015.

== Early life and education ==
Kaberuka was born in Byumba, Rwanda. He studied at the University of Dar es Salaam as an undergraduate and obtained his MPhil in Development Studies from the University of East Anglia in 1979. He received his PhD in economics from the University of Glasgow.

== Career ==
Kaberuka worked in banking and international trade for over a decade. In October 1997 he was appointed minister of finance and economic planning in Rwanda. Kaberuka served in that position for eight years, and is credited with helping to stabilize the Rwandan economy from the effects of the 1994 genocide.

=== African Development Bank, 2005–2015 ===
In July 2005, Kaberuka was elected president of the African Development Bank. He took office in September 2005.

Kaberuka led an institution whose financial standing has been restored from the near collapse of 1995, but whose operational credibility remains a work-in-progress. In addition to his role at the bank, Kaberuka was also a member of the Commission on Effective Development Cooperation with Africa which was set up by the prime minister Anders Fogh Rasmussen of Denmark and held meetings between April and October 2008.

A working group convened by the Center for Global Development, an independent Washington think tank, released a report in September 2006 that offered six recommendations for Kaberuka and the bank's board of directors on broad principles to guide the bank's renewal. The report contains six recommendations for management and shareholders as they address the urgent task of reforming Africa's development bank. Prominent among the recommendations is a strong focus on infrastructure.

=== Global Fund, 2019–2023 ===
Kaberuka serves as the chair of the board of the Global Fund to Fight AIDS, TB and Malaria. His two-year term began 16 May 2019. In this role, Kaberuka helps raise at least US$14 billion for the Global Fund for 2020–2022. The funds will help save 16 million lives, cut the mortality rate from HIV, TB and malaria in half, and build stronger health systems by 2023, according to the Global Fund. In 2021, the Board extended his tenure to the first Board Meeting of 2023.

== Other activities ==
Corporate boards

In December 2015, Kaberuka was appointed senior advisor to a consortium, "TPG/Satya", jointly owned by two private equity firms: the US-based TPG and the London-based Satya Capital, affiliated with Sudanese billionaire Mo Ibrahim.

Other roles include:

- Boston Consulting Group, senior advisor to the public sector, social impact and financial institutions practices (since 2017)
- Centum Investments, chairman and non-executive member of the board of directors (since 2016)
- He is Managing Director of an emerging impact investor, Pan-African advisory and investment company, the SouthBridge Group.

Non-profit organizations In 2017, it was announced that Kaberuka would be joint chair of the LSE-Oxford Commission on State Fragility, Growth and Development under the auspices of the International Growth Centre alongside former UK Prime Minister David Cameron. In 2019, United Nations Secretary-General António Guterres appointed him as co-chair of the High Level-Panel on Internal Displacement, alongside Federica Mogherini. In 2022, Guterres also appointed him to the High-Level Advisory Board on Effective Multilateralism, co-chaired by Ellen Johnson Sirleaf and Stefan Löfven.

Other roles include:

- Founder and Champion of the Alliance for Health Financing in Africa (AHFIA).
- Africa Europe Foundation, Member of the High-Level Group of Personalities on Africa-Europe Relations (since 2020)
- Exemplars in Global Health, Member of the Senior Advisory Board (since 2020)
- Global Leadership Foundation, member (since 2017)
- Rockefeller Foundation, member of the board of trustees (since 2015)
- African Leadership University, chairman of its global advisory council (since 2015)
- Center for Global Development (CGD), Member of the Board of Directors
- Mo Ibrahim Foundation, member of the board
- Brenthurst Foundation, Member of the Advisory Board
- International Growth Centre, Senior Advisor

== Recognition ==
- On 16 March 2015, Kaberuka was awarded Lifetime Achievement Award in Geneva.
- On 27 May 2015, he was awarded the prestigious Leaders for a Living Planet award by World Wide Fund for Nature.

Political offices
Preceded by Jean-Berchmans Birara	Minister of Finance and Economic Planning; 1997–2005	Succeeded by Manasseh Nshuti
Diplomatic posts
Preceded by Omar Kabbaj	President of the African Development Bank; 2005–2015	Succeeded by Akinwumi Adesina
