= United Nations Economic Commission for Africa =

Specialized body of the United Nations

- Abbreviation: UNECA/ECA
- Formation: 1958; 68 years ago
- Type: Primary Organ – Regional Branch
- Legal status: Active
- Headquarters: Africa Hall, Addis Ababa, Ethiopia
- Head: Executive Secretary of the Economic Commission for Africa; Claver Gatete
- Parent organization: United Nations Economic and Social Council
- Website: www.uneca.org

The United Nations Economic Commission for Africa (UNECA or ECA; French: Commission économique pour l'Afrique, CEA) was established in 1958 by the United Nations Economic and Social Council to encourage economic cooperation among its member states (the nations of the African continent) following a recommendation of the United Nations General Assembly. It is one of five regional commissions.

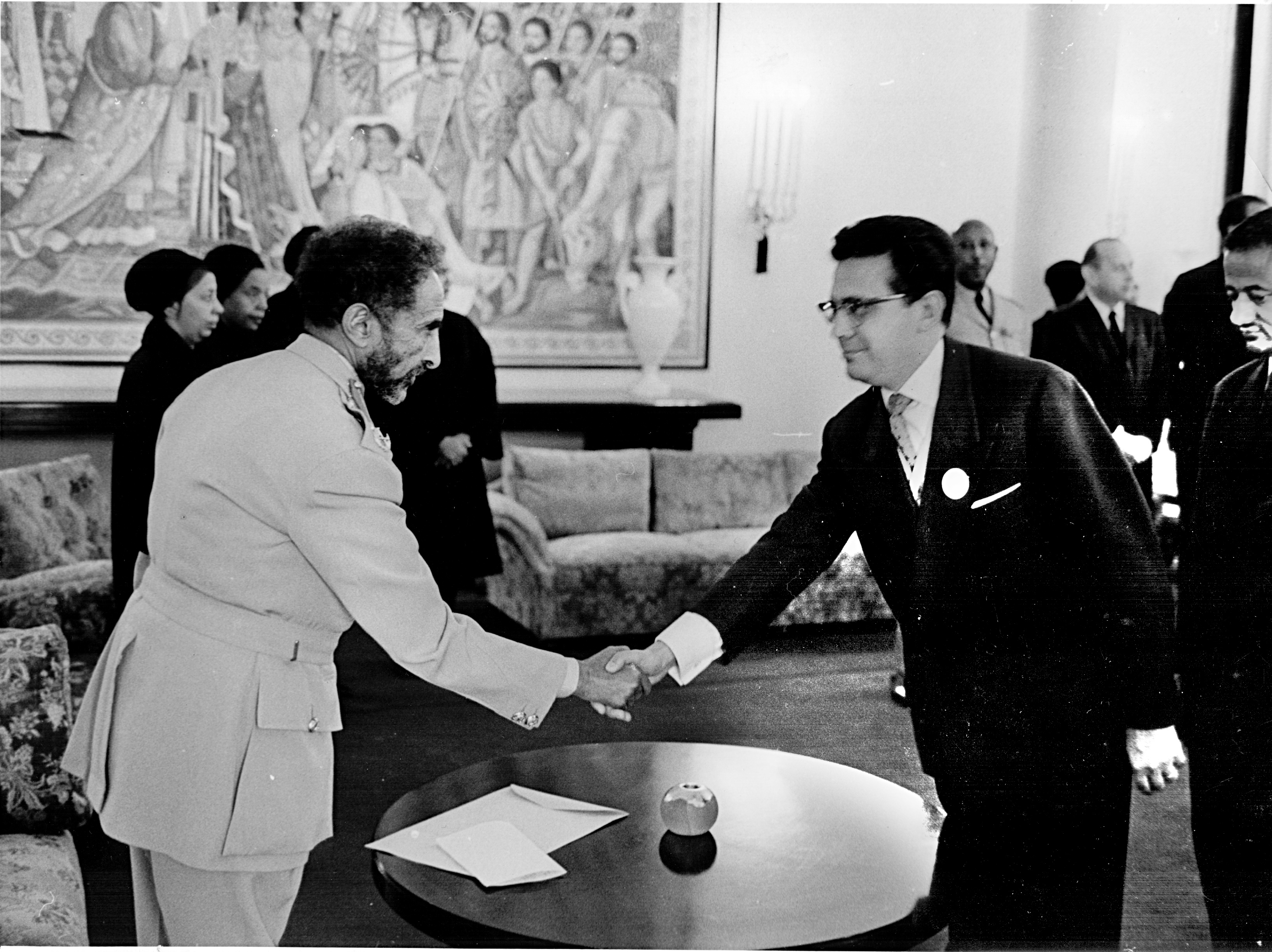
At the Third Session of the UNECA held in Addis Abeba on 19 february 1961, Ethiopia's Emperor Haile Selassie greets Tunisia's Head of Delegation Ahmed Mestiri.

The ECA has 54 member states, corresponding to the 54 member states of the United Nations that lie within the continent of Africa or in oceans nearby the continent. The ECA's mandate is to promote the economic and social development of its member states, foster intra-regional integration, and promote international cooperation for Africa's development.

On October 6, 2023, the UN Secretary-General appointed Claver Gatete of Rwanda as the Executive Secretary of UNECA, replacing the Cameroonian Vera Songwe.

== Themes and programs ==
The commission's work is structured into seven program divisions:

- African Centre for Statistics
- Macroeconomic Policy
- Social development Policy
- Innovation and Technology
- Regional integration and Trade
- Capacity Development

=== Implementing Sustainable Development Goals ===
The ECA seeks to balance the global Sustainable Development Goals with prior regional agendas that are supported by governments. Notably this is done for Agenda 2063, which was agreed on by the African Union a few months before the launch of the SDGs in 2015. To better integrate the two agendas in country plans and activities, UNECA has developed an online tool indicating synergies and trade-offs and an integrated planning and reporting toolkit. In terms of gaps, three of twenty Agenda 2063 goals do not align with any SDG (notably the goals on the establishment of continental financial and monetary institutions and on regional peace and stability, although perhaps these can be caught in a broad definition of SDG 17).

The Regional Fora for Sustainable Development work as a coordination mechanism and resemble a “mini-High-Level Political Forum on Sustainable Development (HLPF)” in the region. The Seventh African Forum on Sustainable Development, for example, was followed by efforts to seek more funding for the Congo Basin by taking the conference outcomes to both the COP26 (the 26th conference of the parties to the UN climate convention) in Glasgow in 2021 and to the High-Level Political Forum on Sustainable Development.

=== Climate finance ===
The COVID-19 pandemic resulted in more debts for many countries and sparked a global discussion on new financial mechanisms. All of the Regional Commissions—except for the one for Europe, given the prevalence of high-income countries in its membership—launched new initiatives, many linked to climate finance. The ECA launched the Liquidity and Sustainability Facility in 2021 to mobilize (private sector) capital, supported by an asset management firm and a collateral management provider. Its objectives are to support the liquidity of African sovereign eurobonds and incentivize SDG-related investments on the continent.

== Locations ==
The headquarters, Africa Hall, is in Addis Ababa, Ethiopia and opened 1961.

There are five subregional headquarters:

- Yaoundé, Cameroon (for Central Africa)
- Kigali, Rwanda (for East Africa)
- Rabat, Morocco (for North Africa)
- Lusaka, Zambia (for Southern Africa)
- Niamey, Niger (for West Africa)

== Member states ==
Map showing the subregions of the ECA: North Africa West Africa Central Africa Eastern Africa Southern Africa

Map showing the member states of the ECA.

- Algeria
- Angola
- Benin
- Botswana
- Burkina Faso
- Burundi
- Cape Verde
- Cameroon
- Central African Republic
- Chad
- Comoros
- Congo
- DR Congo
- Djibouti
- Egypt
- Eritrea
- Eswatini
- Ethiopia
- Equatorial Guinea
- Gabon
- Gambia
- Ghana
- Guinea
- Guinea-Bissau
- Ivory Coast
- Kenya
- Lesotho
- Liberia
- Libya
- Madagascar
- Malawi
- Mali
- Mauritania
- Mauritius
- Mozambique
- Morocco
- Namibia
- Niger
- Nigeria
- Rwanda
- São Tomé and Príncipe
- Senegal
- Seychelles
- Sierra Leone
- Somalia
- South Africa
- South Sudan
- Sudan
- Tanzania
- Togo
- Tunisia
- Uganda
- Zambia
- Zimbabwe

== Executive secretaries ==
The commission's headquarters in Addis Ababa.

Name	Country	Years
Claver Gatete	Rwanda	2023–present
Vera Songwe	Cameroon	2017–2023
Carlos Lopes	Guinea-Bissau	2012–2016
Abdoulie Janneh	Gambia	2005–2012
K. Y. Amoako	Ghana	1995–2005
Layashi Yaker	Algeria	1992–1995
Issa Diallo	Guinea	1991–1992
Adebayo Adedeji	Nigeria	1975–1991
Robert K. A. Gardiner	Ghana	1961–1975
Mekki Abbas	Sudan	1959–1961

== See also ==
- United Nations System
- United Nations Economic and Social Commission for Western Asia (overlapping membership)
- Economy of Africa
- List of central banks of Africa
