= Soraya Munyana Hakuziyaremye =

Rwandan Banker

Soraya Hakuziyaremye
- Born: Brussels, Belgium
- Education: Thunderbird School of Global Management; (Certificate of Advanced Studies in International Management); Solvay Business School Université Libre de Bruxelles; (MSc in Finance and Marketing - Ingénieur de Gestion)
- Occupation: Central Banker
- Years active: 2002–present
- Title: Governor of National Bank of Rwanda
- Spouse: Eric Murangwa Eugene

Soraya Munyana Hakuziyaremye is a Rwandan banker and financial management professional who is serving as the Governor of the National Bank of Rwanda.

She previously served as the Cabinet Minister of Trade and Industry in the Rwandan cabinet and as Vice-President in charge of Financial Markets/Financial Institutions Risk at ING Bank in London.

== Background and education ==
Hakuziyaremye obtained her high school diploma from Ecole Belge de Kigali (Belgian College of Kigali) where her best subjects were mathematics and physics.

She transferred to Brussels, Belgium, where she graduated with a Business Engineering degree (Ingénieur de Gestion) specializing in Finance and Marketing, from the Solvay Business School of Université Libre de Bruxelles. She also holds a Certificate of Advanced Studies in International Management, awarded by the Thunderbird School of Global Management, in Phoenix, Arizona, United States and is an alumna of the Executive Public Leaders Program at the Blavatnik School of Government at the University of Oxford .

== Career ==
For a period of nearly four years, beginning in December 2002, Hakuziyaremye worked at the Bank of New York in Brussels, Belgium. She then joined BNP Paribas Fortis, where she spent the next six years in the Financial Institutions Group.

In June 2012 she went back to Rwanda and spent two and a half years serving as Senior Advisor to the Minister of Foreign Affairs and Cooperation, based in Kigali. After a brief stint in private consulting in Brussels and Kigali, she was hired by the Dutch financial conglomerate, ING, where she rose to the rank of Vice President, Financial Institutions & Financial Markets Risk Management, based in London, United Kingdom.

In a cabinet reshuffle on 18 October 2018, she was named the cabinet minister of Trade and Industry.

On 15 March 2021, she joined the National Bank of Rwanda as Deputy Governor.

On 25 February 2025, she was appointed Governor of the National Bank of Rwanda, becoming the first-ever woman to lead Rwanda's Central Bank.

== See also ==
- Germaine Kamayirese
- Espérance Nyirasafari
- Marie-Solange Kayisire
