= Thomas Kwesi Quartey =

Ghanaian diplomat

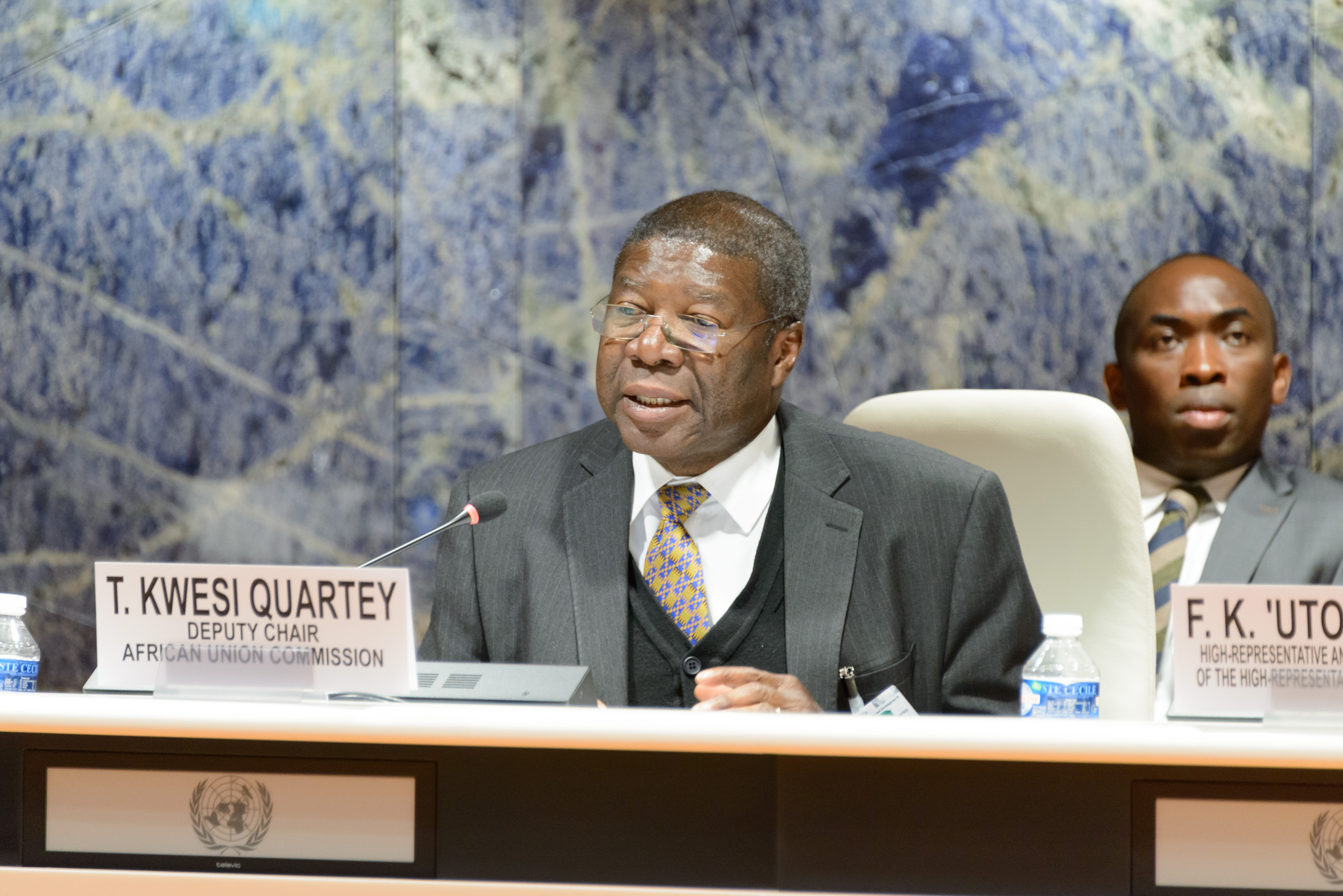

Deputy Chairperson of African Union Commission
- In office 14 March 2017 – February 2021
- President: Moussa Faki
- Succeeded by: Monique Nsanzabaganwa

Deputy Minister of Foreign Affairs and Regional Integration of Ghana
- In office 2013–2016
- President: John Mahama

Permanent Representative of Ghana to the United Nations
- In office 2012–2012
- President: John Mahama

Personal details
- Born: December 17, 1950 (age 75)
- Occupation: Diplomat

Thomas Kwesi Quartey born December 17, 1950, is a Ghanaian diplomat who has served as Deputy Chairperson of African Union Commission from January 30, 2017 to February 2021. He was Deputy Minister of Foreign Affairs and Regional Integration of Ghana from 2013 to 2016.

== Life and career ==
Born in Ghana, Kwesi is a University of Ghana alumnus and a professional lawyer. He was secretary to the President of Ghana in 2015, he served as Ghana's Permanent Representative to the United Nations in 2012.

He worked in Ghana's High Commissions and Embassies abroad and also served as Ghana's Deputy Head of Mission in London.
