= Commissioner general =

Police rank used in Asian countries

Commissioner general is a senior rank in police forces used in China, Indonesia, South Korea, and Japan.

== Japan ==
In Japan, those people with this rank are not included on the hierarchy of the ranks because the Superintendent general, the chief of police of the Tokyo Metropolitan Police Department is highest nationwide. The commissioner general is the head of the National Police Agency.

Japan

== South Korea ==
In South Korean police, the Commissioner General was the highest rank and position in the police force. On its hierarchy, it was higher than chief superintendent general.

South Korea
