= Rwanda Revenue Authority =

Tax collection agency of Rwanda

- RRA
- Rwanda Tax Office building

Agency overview
- Formed: 1998
- Jurisdiction: Government of Rwanda
- Headquarters: Kimihurura, Kigali, Rwanda
- Agency executive: NIWENSHUTI Ronald, commissioner general
- Parent agency: Rwanda Ministry of Finance and Economic Development
- Website: www.rra.gov.rw

The Rwanda Revenue Authority (RRA) is a government revenue collection agency established by the Parliament of Rwanda. The RRA is charged with enforcing, assessing, collecting, and accounting for the various taxes imposed in Rwanda.

== Overview ==
The law that created the Rwanda Revenue Authority was passed by the Rwandan Parliament in 1997, but the agency became operational in 1998. RRA is supervised by the Rwanda Ministry of Finance and Economic Planning.

RRA started in 1998, with 200 employees who needed training and equipping with skills and technology to perform their duties. An organizational structure had to be established and streamlined into departments and a coherent chain of command. As of May 2017, the tax body was expected to collect at least RWF:1 trillion (approx. US$1,215,000,000), for the first time, in the financial year ending in June 2017. At that time, the agency maintained 168,346 taxpayers.

Non compliance by large corporate clients, and the sourcing and retention of qualified experienced staff, remain challenges for the tax agency.

== Administration ==
The chief executive officer of the organization is the commissioner general, currently Niwenshuti Ronald, appointed by the president of Rwanda, with the consent of the Senate, for a term of five years, renewable once. The commissioner general is assisted by a deputy commissioner general.

The agency has two service departments, each headed by a commissioner: the Customs Services Department and the Domestic Taxes Department.

There are eleven supportive departments / divisions, each headed by either a commissioner or an assistant commissioner:

- IT and Digital Transformation Department
- Strategy and Risk Analysis Department
- Finance Department
- Human Resource Division
- Administration and Logistics Division
- Custom Services Department
- Domestic Taxes Department
- Legal Services and Board Affairs Department
- Internal Audit and Integrity Department
- Strategic Intelligence and Investigation
- Taxpayer Services and Communication Division

== See also ==
- Economy of Rwanda
