= Vera Songwe =

Cameroonian economist

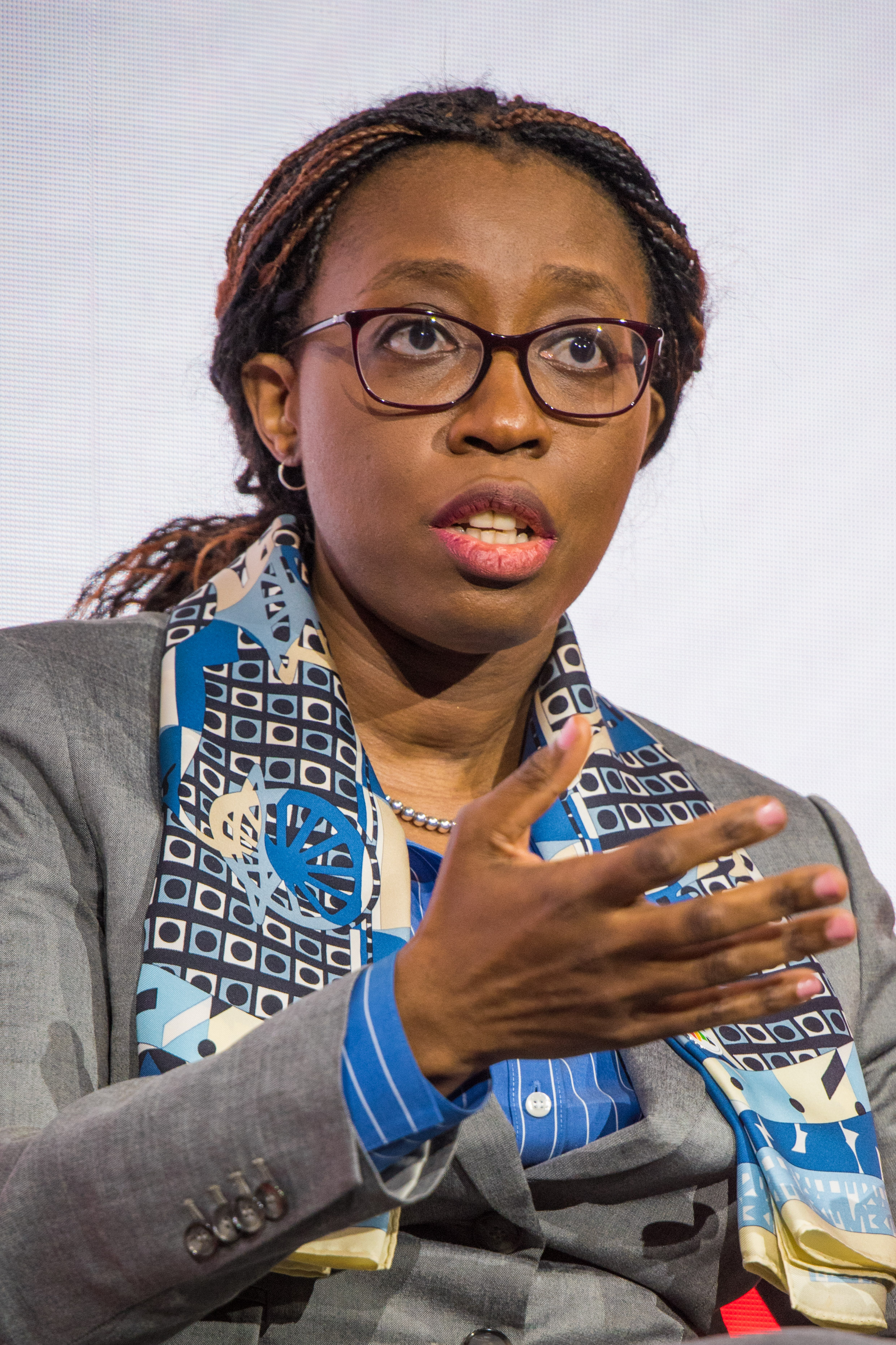
- Songwe in 2020

United Nations Under-Secretary-General and Executive Secretary of the United Nations Economic Commission for Africa (UNECA)
- In office August 2017 – August 2022
- Secretary-General: António Guterres

Regional Director of West and Central Africa for the International Finance Corporation (IFC)
- In office July 2015 – August 2017

Personal details
- Education: Université Catholique de Louvain (PhD) (MA); University of Michigan (BA)
- Occupation: Economist and Banker

Academic background
- Doctoral advisor: Herakles Polemarchakis

Vera Songwe is an economist and banking executive from Cameroon who worked for the World Bank from 1998 to 2015, and in 2015–2017 served as Western and Central Africa's regional director for the International Finance Corporation. She was the first woman to head the UN's Economic Commission for Africa (ECA) at the level of Under-Secretary-General. Songwe currently serves as a non-resident Senior Fellow at the Brookings Institution's Africa Growth Initiative.

== Early life and education ==
Songwe holds a PhD in Mathematical Economics from the Center for Operations Research and Econometrics and a Master of Arts in Law and Economics and a Diplôme d’études approfondies in Economic Science and Politics from the Université Catholique de Louvain in Belgium. She has a Bachelor of Arts degree in Economics and Political Science from the University of Michigan.

== Career ==
Songwe worked for the Federal Reserve Bank of Minneapolis, and simultaneously had a visiting professor's appointment at the University of Southern California.

In 1998, Songwe joined the World Bank, where she worked in the Poverty Reduction and Economic Management (PREM) unit, covering Morocco and Tunisia. Over the subsequent years, she filled several roles in the PREM unit for East Asia and the Pacific region. In 2010, Songwe was part of the World Bank Group team that raised a historic US$49.3 billion dollars in concessional financing for the low income countries of the world as part of the International Development Association (IDA) 16th replenishment.

From 2011 to 2015, Songwe was Regional Director Africa covering West and Central Africa for the International Finance Corporation (IFC), and Country Director for Senegal, Cape Verde, The Gambia, Guinea Bissau, and Mauritania. Her main areas of interest are fiscal policy, innovative financing mechanisms for development, agriculture, energy and economic governance.

In 2011, Songwe was involved in Africa 2.0, an initiative to bring young Africans together to aid in the continent's economic development. She is a scholar at the Brookings Institution, at its Africa Growth Initiative. Forbes listed her in 2013 as one of the "20 Young Power Women in Africa", and the following year the Institut Choiseul for International Politics and Geoeconomics chose her as one of their "African leaders of tomorrow". In 2015 she collaborated with the newly-founded Tony Elumelu Entrepreneurship Programme, which pledged $100 million for African start-up companies.

In July 2015, Songwe was appointed Regional Director of the IFC for West and Central Africa.

Songwe took up her role as the Executive Secretary of the Economic Commission for Africa (ECA) on 3 August 2017 at the level of Under-Secretary-General.

In June 2020, Songwe and others – Nobel laureates in Economics, architects, chefs and leaders of international organizations – signed the appeal in favour of the purple economy ("Towards a cultural renaissance of the economy"), published in Corriere della Sera, El País and Le Monde.

On 22 August 2022, Songewe announced her resignation from UNECA.

== Other activities ==
She is also a member of the African Union Institutional reform team under the direction of the President of Rwanda, Paul Kagame, and a board member of the African Leadership Network, the Mo Ibrahim Foundation, and ID4Africa.

In early 2021, Songwe was appointed by the G20 to the High Level Independent Panel (HLIP) on financing the global commons for pandemic preparedness and response, co-chaired by Ngozi Okonjo-Iweala, Tharman Shanmugaratnam and Lawrence Summers.

== Speeches ==
1. Statement by the Executive Secretary at the Fourth Conference of Ministers Responsible for Civil Registration, Lusaka, Zambia, 7 December 2017
2. Statement by the Executive Secretary at the opening of the African Economic Conference, Addis Ababa, Ethiopia, 4 December 2017
3. Statement by the Executive Secretary at the opening of the Conference on Land Policy in Africa (CLPA-2017), Addis Ababa, Ethiopia, 14 November 2017
4. Statement by Dr. Vera Songwe, United Nations Under-Secretary-General and Executive Secretary of the UNECA at the Opening Session of the 18th Executive Council Meeting of the Extraordinary Summit on the African Continental Free Trade Area
5. Closing the Tech Gender Gap

== Publications ==
1. "Winning the Fight against Corruption: A Sustainable Path to Africa's Transformation"

== Featured articles ==
1. Africa Finance Ministers conference discusses importance of digital economy to continent
2. La mauvaise gouvernance tue les jeunes Africains selon la Fondation Mo Ibrahim
3. Strengthening National Accounts, SDGs And Employment At The Heart Of ECA-Egypt Bilateral Meeting
4. Mo Ibrahim: African migrations are an opportunity, not a crisis
5. Concerns have emerged as Africa nations move to ratify the biggest free trade agreement, African Continental Free Trade Agreement in May 2019.
6. Lack of domestic revenue crippling African economies
7. Half of the world’s youth will be African
8. Africa urged to speed up digitization
9. Conferência discute investimentos na economia digital
10. Poor governance is killing Africa’s young people - Mo Ibrahim Foundation
11. Africa Fintech association launched in Morocco
12. Économie et développement
13. Africa's free trade area comes into force as Gambia ratification
14. Gambia ratifies AfCFTA, putting it into motion
15. Les gouvernements africains priés d’adopter la transformation numérique
16. Identifying and addressing land governance constraints to support intensification and land market operation: Evidence from 10 African countries
