= Kemi Adeosun =

Nigerian accountant, investment banker and politician (born 1967)

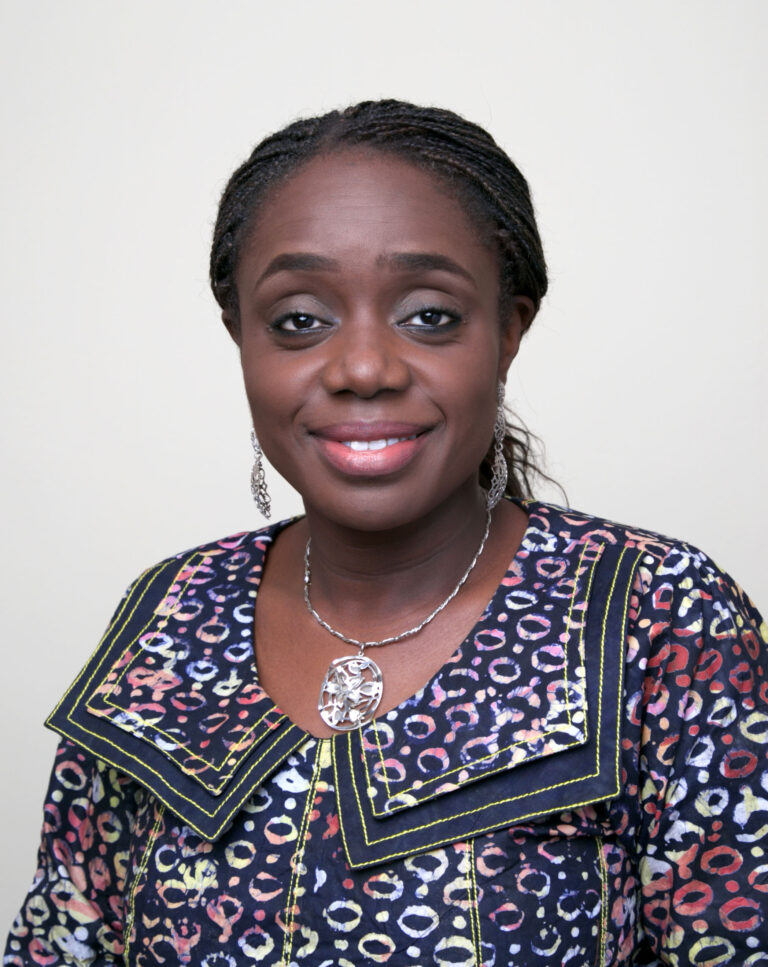

Minister of Finance
- In office 11 November 2015 – 14 September 2018
- President: Muhammadu Buhari
- Preceded by: Ngozi Okonjo-Iweala
- Succeeded by: Zainab Ahmed

Personal details
- Born: 9 March 1967 (age 59) London, England
- Education: University of East London
- Profession: Chartered Accountant

Kemi Adeosun (born 9 March 1967) is the former Finance Minister of Nigeria and former chairman of the Board of African Export–Import Bank (AfreximBank).

== Early life and education ==
Kemi Adeosun was born on 9 March 1967 in London, England to Nigerian parents, both who hail from Ogun State. Her father was a government civil Engineer. She is the third of her father's four children. Adeosun earned a Bachelor of Science degree in Economics from the University of East London, a public university located in the London borough of Newham. She also holds a Postgraduate Diploma in Public Financial Management from the University of London and has attended various executive management programmes such as leadership training at the prestigious Wharton Business School. In 1994, Adeosun qualified as a Chartered Accountant with the Institute of Chartered Accountants in England and Wales (ICAEW).

== Career ==
Kemi Adeosun began her career as an accounting assistant at British Telecom, London, from 1989 till 1990, after which she moved to Goodman Jones, London, working as a senior audit officer from 1990 till 1993. Kemi then became the manager of Internal Audit at London Underground, London and Prism Consulting from 1994 till 2000 before joining PricewaterhouseCoopers, London as Senior Manager from 2000 till 2002. In 2002, She became financial controller at Chapel Hill Denham Management and subsequently, managing director in 2010. After working with Quo Vadis Partnership as managing director from 2010 to 2011, she was then appointed Ogun State's Commissioner of Finance 2011. Kemi maintained this role from 2011 to 2015. She was a key part of Governor Ibikunle Amosun's Mission to Build, which turned around economic fortunes of the state.

In November 2015, Adeosun Kemi was appointed Nigeria's Minister of Finance by President Muhammadu Buhari. During the annual general meeting of Afreximbank in Abuja to commemorate its 25th anniversary, Adeosun was elected chairman of the board of the bank. Kemi Adeosun succeeded the outgoing chairman Ndagijimana Uzziel, Minister of Finance of the Republic of Rwanda.

=== NYSC certificate scandal ===
On 7 July 2018, Nigerian online newspaper Premium Times alleged that Kemi Adeosun had illegally obtained her NYSC exemption certificate to get into public office. On 9 July, NYSC Director of Press and Public relations Adeyemi Adenike released a statement that confirmed that Adeosun legitimately submitted a request for an exemption certificate, but also stated that investigations were still ongoing to verify the approval of the exemption certificate. On 14 September 2018, Adeosun resigned as Minister of Finance in a written letter to the President due to the alleged NYSC Certificate forgery scandal.

=== Political association ===
After officially being non-partisan throughout her career, Kemi Adeosun joined Nigeria's ruling party, the All Progressives Congress (APC), on 5 May 2018.

== Other activities ==
- African Development Bank (AfDB), Ex-Officio Member of the Board of Governors (2015-2018)
- United Nations Joint Staff Pension Fund, Member of the Investment Committee (2018)
- World Bank, Ex-Officio Alternate Member of the Board of Governors (2015-2018)

== See also ==
- Finance Minister of Nigeria
