= Mekki Abbas =

Sudanese Civil Servant

Sayed Mekki Abbas
- Born: 1 January 1911
- Occupations: Civil servant, Economist
- Known for: Executive Secretary of the United Nations Economic Commission for Africa (1959-1961)
- Title: Director-General of the Food and Agriculture Organization's Department of Economic and Social Affairs (1963); Acting Head of the United Nations Operation in the Congo (March 1961)
- Term: January 1959 - October 1961

Academic background
- Education: University of London
- Thesis: The Economic Commission for Africa (ECA) and development in Africa (1990)

Sayed Mekki Abbas (born January 1, 1911) was a Sudanese civil servant and economist who served as the Executive Secretary of the United Nations Economic Commission for Africa from January 1959 until October 1961. In 1963 he became Director-General of the Food and Agriculture Organization's Department of Economic and Social Affairs.

He also served as acting head of the United Nations Operation in the Congo in March 1961 for a period while Rajeshwar Dayal had been recalled to New York for consultations.
