= James Musoni =

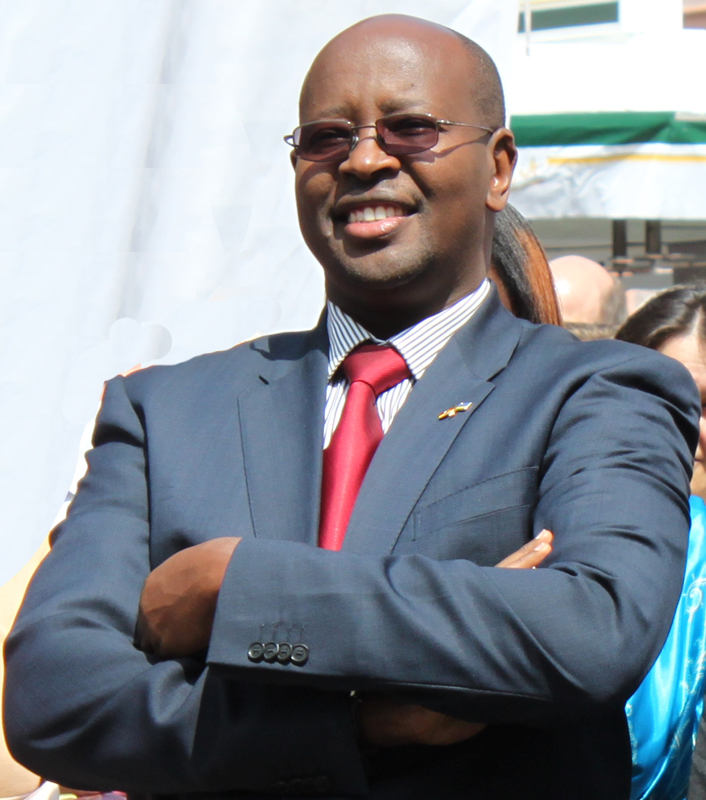
- James Musoni in 2012
- Born: Rwanda
- Citizenship: Rwandan
- Education: Newport International University (Master of Business Administration); Makerere University (Bachelor of Commerce); Harvard Kennedy School (Certificate in Public Finance Management)
- Occupation: Government official
- Years active: 1994 — present

James Musoni is a Rwandan politician; since 2018 the Ambassador of the Republic of Rwanda to the Republic of Zimbabwe.

== Career ==
James Musoni has served in the following offices:

- Minister of Infrastructure (2014-2018)
- Minister of Local Government (2009-2014)
- Minister of Finance and Economic Planning (2006-2009)
- Minister of Commerce, Industry, Investment Promotion, Tourism and Cooperatives (2005-2006)
- Minister of State in charge of Investment promotion and Industries (2005)
- Commissioner General of Rwanda Revenue Authority (2001-2005)
- Deputy commissioner General of Rwanda Revenue Authority (2000)
- Director of Youth Affairs, Ministry of Youth, Sports and Culture (1994-2000)
- A member of Presidential Advisory Council (PAC) (2008-2018)

He has been part of the team that spearheaded and guided a number of reforms in Rwanda that have contributed to the country's good performance in socio-economic and political transformation.
