= Rwandan franc =

Currency of Rwanda

Ifaranga ry'u Rwanda (Kinyarwanda); franc rwandais (French)
- Current banknotes of the Rwandan franc

ISO 4217
- Code: RWF (numeric: 646)

Units of account
- Base unit: Franc
- Plural: Francs
- Symbol: RF, R₣
- Subunit
- 1/100: cent

Denominations
- Banknotes: 500, 1000, 2000, 5000 francs
- Coins: 1, 5, 10, 20, 50, 100 francs

Demographics
- Date of introduction: 1964
- User(s): Rwanda

Issuance
- Central bank: National Bank of Rwanda
- Website: www.bnr.rw

Valuation
- Inflation: 7.2%
- Source: National Institute of Statistics of Rwanda, as of November 2025.
- Method: CPI

The franc (Kinyarwanda: ifaranga); abbreviation: FRw; ISO code: RWF) is the currency of Rwanda. It is technically divided into 100 centimes, though they have never been issued in physical form. The National Bank of Rwanda is mandated to issue the national currency.

== History ==
The Belgian Congo franc became the currency of Rwanda in 1916 after Belgian forces occupied Rwanda, replacing the German East African rupie. Rwanda used the currency of the Belgian Congo until 1960, when the Rwanda and Burundi franc was introduced. Following its independence in 1962, Rwanda began issuing the Rwandan franc in 1964.

A proposal exists to introduce a common currency, a new East African shilling, for the five member states of the East African Community. Whilst the target date was before the end of 2012, as of March 2025, the common currency has still yet to be introduced. Implimentation has faced delays due to uneven economic development in member states.

== Coins ==
In 1964, coins were introduced for 1, 5 and 10 francs, with the 1 and 10 francs in cupronickel and the 5 francs in bronze. In 1969, aluminium 1 franc coins were introduced, followed in 1970 by 1/2 and 2 francs also in aluminium. A reduced sized copper-nickel 10 franc coin was issued in 1974.

Brass 20 and 50 francs were introduced in 1977. New series of 1 to 50 franc coins were issued in 2004 (dated 2003) and a new bimetallic coin of 100 francs was introduced in 2008 (dated 2007)

- 1 franc - 98% Aluminium, 2% Magnesium
- 5 francs - Bronze
- 10 francs - Bronze
- 20 francs - Nickel-plated steel
- 50 francs - Nickel-plated steel
- 100 francs - Nickel-plated steel ring and Copper-plated steel centre

== Banknotes ==
In 1964, provisional notes were created for use in Rwanda by handstamping (20 to 100 francs) or embossing (500 and 1,000 francs) Rwanda-Burundi notes bearing their original dates and signatures. These were followed by regular issues for the same amounts dated 1964 to 1976.

20 and 50 franc notes were replaced by coins in 1977, with 5,000 franc notes introduced in 1978. The nation's first-ever 2,000 franc note was introduced in mid-December 2007. In 2008 the bank replaced the 100 franc note with a bimetallic coin, and revoked the notes’ legal tender status on 31 December 2009. On September 24, 2013, the National Bank of Rwanda issued a redesigned 500 franc note depicting cows on the front and students with XO computers (from One Laptop per Child) on the back. In December 2014, the National Bank of Rwanda issued 2,000 and 5,000 franc notes with revised security features and the removal of French descriptions on the notes. In October 2015, the National Bank of Rwanda issued a revised 1000 franc note with improved security features and the removal of French descriptions on the notes.

On 7 February 2019, the National Bank of Rwanda announced new 500 francs and 1,000 francs banknotes would be introduced on 11 February 2019. These banknotes will have new security features and better quality to reduce wear. The design of the front of the 500 franc note is entirely new, and the overall colour has been changed to brown to help distinguish it from the 1,000 franc note.

Banknotes of the Rwandan franc (Current issue)
Image	Value	Obverse	Reverse
	500 francs (Amafaranga Magana Atanu)	Students studying with XO computers	Cows
	500 francs (Amafaranga Magana Atanu)	Students studying with XO computers	Nyungwe Canopy; Muregeya suspension footbridge
	1000 francs (Amafaranga Igihumbi)	National Museum of Rwanda, Butare	Golden monkey, Volcanoes national park
	2000 francs (Amafaranga Ibihumbi Bibiri)	Satellite dish and a radio tower	Coffee beans
	5000 francs (Amafaranga Ibihumbi Bitanu)	Gorillas in Volcanoes National Park	Baskets

In 2024, the National Bank introduced updated 2000 and 5000 franc notes, crafted by De La Rue and which circulate alongside the previous versions of the same denominations. The 2000 franc note, predominantly violet, showcases Lake Kivu on its front and coffee beans on its reverse. The 5000 franc note, in shades of lilac, features the Kigali Convention Centre on one side and traditional Rwandan baskets on the other. Both notes include enhanced security measures, such as the dynamic, color-shifting IGNITE® thread and the GEMINI™ feature, which reveals intricate patterns under ultraviolet light.

== Historical exchange rates ==
Rwandan francs per US dollar:

- 262.20 (1995)
- 393.44 (2000)
- 610 (2005)
- 570 (2010)
- 689 (2014)
- 760 (2016)
- 947 (2020)
- 1401 (Jan 2025)
- 1444 (Oct 2025)

Current RWF exchange rates
From Google Finance:	AUD CAD CHF CNY EUR GBP HKD JPY USD
From Yahoo! Finance:	AUD CAD CHF CNY EUR GBP HKD JPY USD
From XE.com:	AUD CAD CHF CNY EUR GBP HKD JPY USD
From OANDA:	AUD CAD CHF CNY EUR GBP HKD JPY USD

== See also ==
- Economy of Rwanda
- Burundian franc
