= National Bank of Rwanda =

Central bank of Rwanda

National Bank of Rwanda Banki Nkuru Y'u Rwanda Banque Nationale du Rwanda

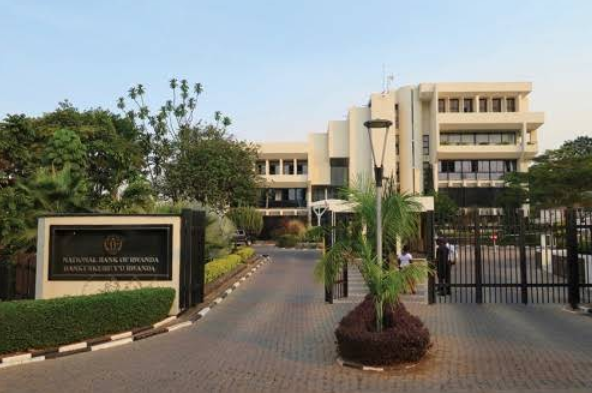
- Central bank of: Rwanda
- Headquarters: KN6 Avenue; Kigali, Rwanda
- Established: 1964
- Ownership: 100% state ownership
- Governor: Soraya Hakuziyaremye
- Currency: Rwanda franc RWF (ISO 4217)
- Reserves: US$1.9 billion (July 2022)
- Website: www.bnr.rw

The National Bank of Rwanda (Kinyarwanda: Banki Nkuru Y'u Rwanda, French: Banque Nationale du Rwanda) is the central bank of Rwanda. It was founded in 1964. The current governor of the bank is Soraya Munyana Hakuziyaremye.

== Location ==
It is quartered at the National Bank of Rwanda Building, on KN6 Avenue in the central business district of Kigali, the capital and largest city in Rwanda. The coordinates of the bank's headquarters are 01°56'56.0"S, 30°03'49.0"E (Latitude:-1.948889; Longitude:30.063611).

== Overview ==
The bank is active in promoting financial inclusion policy, and is a leading member of the Alliance for Financial Inclusion. It is also one of the original 17 regulatory institutions to make specific national commitments to financial inclusion under the Maya Declaration during the 2011 Global Policy Forum held in Mexico.

== Governors ==
Governors of the National Bank of Rwanda:

- Johan A. Brandon: 1964–1965
- Masaya Hattori: 1965–1971
- Jean Berchmans Birara: 1971–1985
- Augustin Ruzindana: 1985–1990
- Denis Ntirugirimbabazi: 1991–1994
- Gérard Niyitegeka: 1994–1995
- François Mutemberezi: 1996–2002
- François Kanimba: 2002–2011
- Claver Gatete: 2011–2013
- John Rwangombwa: 2013–2025
- Soraya Hakuziyaremye: 2025–

== History ==
The central bank, whose name is abbreviated to "BNR", evolved step by step:

- Royal Decree of 27th July 1887 establishes the franc as the money of account for the Independent State of Congo, a.k.a. Congo Free State, and Rwanda is included as well.
- Heligoland Agreement of 1890 puts Rwanda and Burundi within the German sphere of influence in Africa; the German East African rupie is the official currency; circulation of the French franc continues nonetheless.
- As a result of Belgium's actions, the Belgian Congo becomes a member of the Latin Monetary Union in 1908.
- Banque du Congo Belge established in 1909.
- Bank of Belgian Congo issues its first banknotes in 1912.
- Rwanda and Burundi attached to the Congo Franc Zone following Germany's defeat in World War I; 1927
- Colony of Belgian Congo and Banque du Congo Belge create a new relationship; 1927–1952
  - World War II era: temporary involvement of the Bank of England; Congo franc is listed in London.
- Banque Centrale du Congo Belge et du Ruanda-Urundi (BCCBRU) 1952 - 1960
- Banque d'Émission du Rwanda et du Burundi (BERB) / (issuing bank of Rwanda and Burundi) - 1960–1964
- Royal Bank of Burundi (BRB) and the Banque Nationale du Rwanda (BNR) open in 1964.
- Banque de la République du Burundi (BRB) opens in 1966.

== See also ==
- Rwandan franc
- Economy of Rwanda
- List of central banks of Africa
- List of central banks
- List of financial supervisory authorities by country
