= Kivu (disambiguation) =

Kivu was the name for a large "Region" in the Democratic Republic of Congo under the rule of Mobutu Sese Seko.

Kivu may also refer to:

- Apostolic Vicariate of Kivu, two vicariates of the White Fathers
- Diocese of Nord Kivu, an Anglican see
- Kivu 56 Power Station, a proposed installation in Rwanda
- Kivu Air, an airline based in Goma, Democratic Republic of the Congo
- Kivu conflict, began in 2004
  - 2013 Kivu Offensive
- Kivu District, a district of the Belgian Congo
- Kivu Lacus, a small hydrocarbon lake on the moon Titan
- Kivu Province, a province of the Belgian Congo and the Democratic Republic of the Congo
- Kivu Railway, a former narrow gauge railway (1931-1958)
- Kivu Ruhorahoza (born 1982), Rwandese film director, writer and producer
- KivuWatt Power Station, Rwanda
- Lake Kivu, one of the African Great Lakes, on the border between the Democratic Republic of the Congo and Rwanda
  - 2008 Lake Kivu earthquake
- North Kivu, a province of the Democratic Republic of the Congo
  - 2008 Nord-Kivu campaign, an armed conflict
  - 2014 North Kivu offensive
- South Kivu, a province of the Democratic Republic of the Congo
  - 2010 South Kivu fuel tank explosion
  - 2014 South Kivu attack
  - 2015 South Kivu earthquake
  - Provincial Assembly of Sud-Kivu
- Vicar Apostolic of Kivu, a predecessor of the Roman Catholic Archdiocese of Bukavu

== See also ==
- 2018 Kivu Democratic Republic of the Congo Ebola virus outbreak
- Kivu clawed frog (Xenopus vestitus)
- Kivu climbing mouse (Dendromus nyasae)
- Kivu giant pouched rat (Cricetomys kivuensis)
- Kivu long-haired shrew (Crocidura lanosa)
- Kivu shrew (Crocidura kivuana)
- Kivu ground thrush (Geokichla piaggiae tanganicae)
- Ornipholidotos kivu, a butterfly found in Kivu
- Retreat at Lake Kivu, an international forum for discussing issues related to genocide at Lake Kivu, Rwanda
