= Bashi (Shi people) =

Shi
Bashi, aBashi
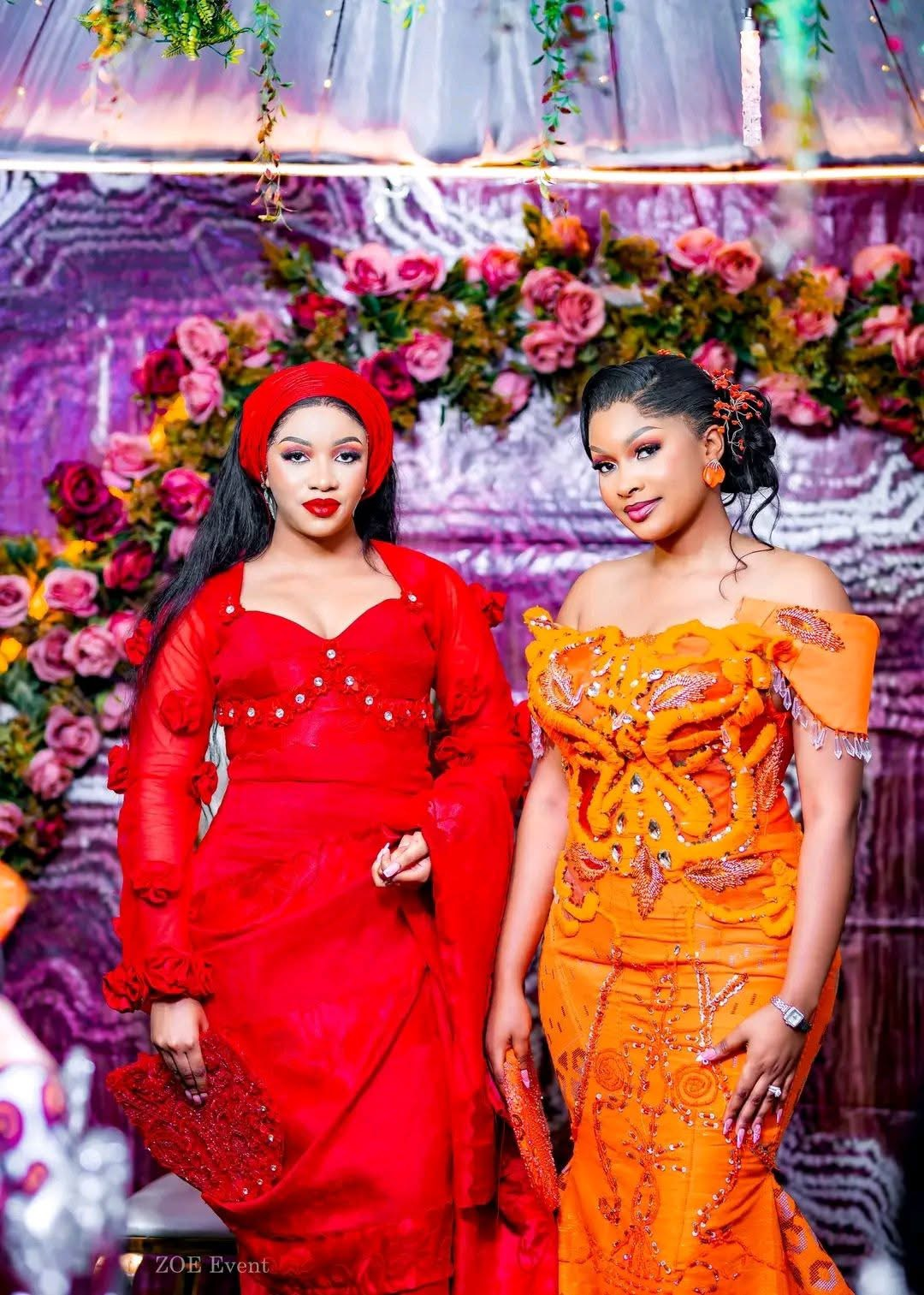
- Two Shi women at a wedding in the Democratic Republic of Congo

Total population
- 15000000 (2022)

Regions with significant populations
- Democratic Republic of the Congo

Languages
- Mashi; Kiswahili; French; English

Religion
- Christianity; Bashi religion

Related ethnic groups
- Bahavu; Bafuliru; Bavira; Banyindu; other Bantu peoples

The Bashi are a Bantu population (10 to 25 million) of Central Africa, primarily settled in Bushi – or the territory of the Bashi – in the extreme east of the Democratic Republic of the Congo, particularly in the territories of Walungu, Kabare, Mwenga, Kalehe, Idjwi, Fizi, Shabunda, and Uvira. Their main reference cities are Bukavu and Goma.

They are also widely present in North Kivu and in Goma. They are one of the most widespread ethnic groups in the Democratic Republic of the Congo, being present across a large part of the country, in every major city and especially in Kinshasa.

== Etymology ==
The word Mushi refers to an inhabitant of the Bushi. The territory of Bushi is inhabited by the Ba-shi in the plural, whose singular form is Mu-shi.

The language spoken by the inhabitants of Bushi is Mashi. Thus, "Shi" functions primarily as a stem that can take several prefixes and thereby change its meaning. The term "Shi" is therefore a French-derived form of a word that is actually a morpheme.

According to different sources, several variants can be found: Amashi, Bashi, and Shis. The Bashi were one of the powerful kingdoms established in eastern Democratic Republic of the Congo, around the 17th to 19th centuries, with Mwami Kabare as their supreme ruler. The kingdom later split into several smaller kingdoms extending from Kabare towards Walungu, Mwenga, Kalehe, Idjwi, and other surrounding territories.

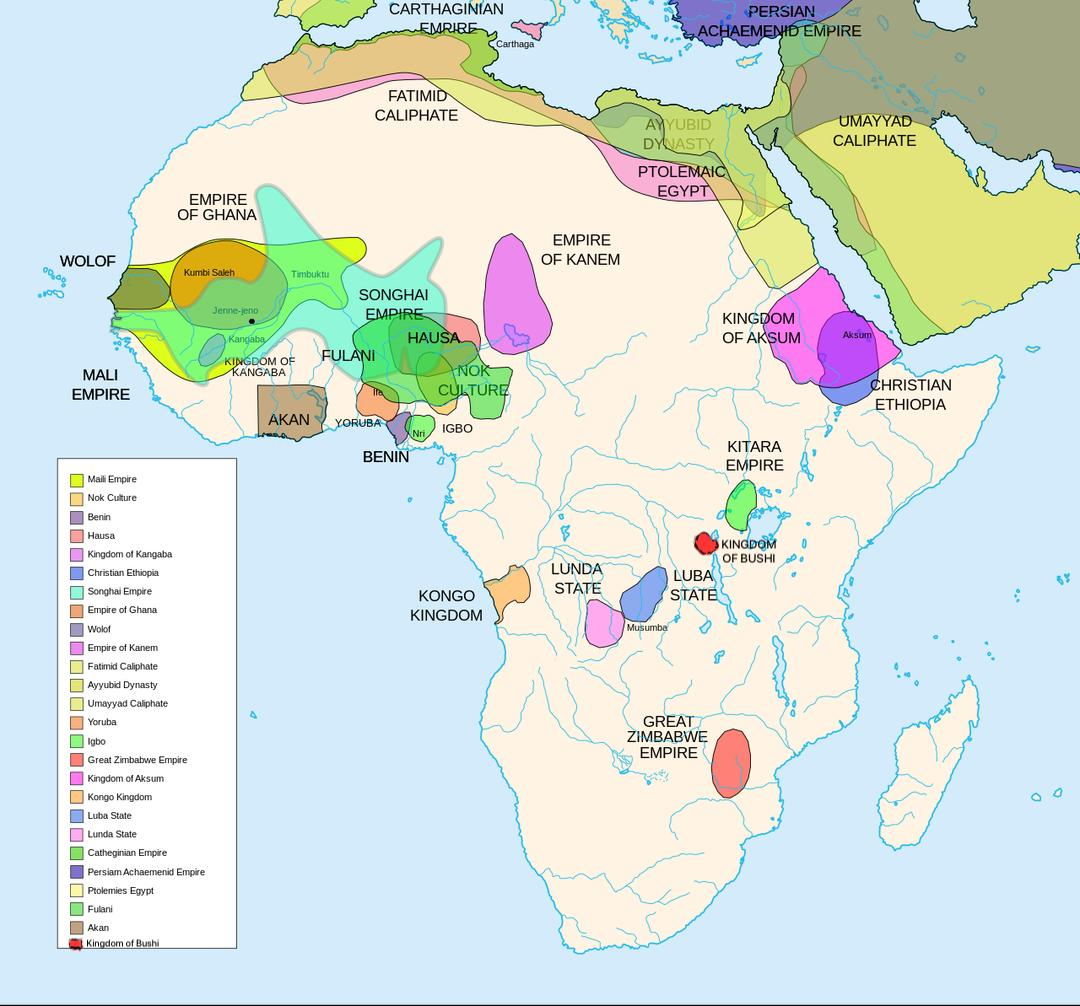
The Kingdom of Bushi on the map of Ancient Kingdoms in Africa

== Language ==
The Shi, or Mashi, is a Bantu language spoken primarily in South Kivu and North Kivu in the Democratic Republic of the Congo. It is traditionally spoken in the region known as Bushi, west and southwest of Lake Kivu, by the Shi, and has nearly two million speakers according to estimates.

Its dialects include Kihavu, Kinyindu, Kifuliiru, and others.

Flag of the Democratic Republic of the Congo

The Shi or Mashi is a Bantu language spoken mainly in South Kivu, in eastern Democratic Republic of the Congo. It is the historical language of the Bashi people and is one of the principal means of communication in the territories of Kabare, Idjwi, Walungu, Kalehe, and Mwenga, as well as in parts of Uvira, the city of Bukavu, and several neighboring regions.

Mashi forms a linguistic group composed of several mutually intelligible regional dialects. Among the principal dialects are Kihavu, spoken particularly by the Bahavu on Idjwi Island and in certain areas along the shores of Lake Kivu; Kifuliiru, spoken by the Bafuliiru in the territory of Uvira; and Kinyindu, spoken by the Banyindu. Despite differences in pronunciation, vocabulary, and certain local features, these varieties belong to the same linguistic and cultural continuum.

== Bashi clans and totems ==
Representative table of the clans and their totems

Clan name	Term in Mashi	Term in English
Babambo	Kafunzi	Wren
Babirizi	Nkwale	Partridge
Babofa	Nyamwisisi	Wagtail
Babwanda	Cibuzi	Sheep
Badaha	Nyamwisisi	Wagtail
Bafunda	Nyamwisisi	Wagtail
Bagomba	Kafunzi	Wren
Bahamba	Ngabi	Grey antelope
Bahande	Mpene	Goat
Bahanga	Mbogo	Buffalo
Bahangarhwa	Cinonera	Grey grasshopper
Bahesi	Igu	Python
Bahondwa	Kafunzi	Wren
Bakanga	Kabambali	Catfish
Bakangarhwa	Kabwa	Dog
Bakumu	Musimbi	Serval
Balamba	Katunzi	Wren
Balangiro	Ngwi	Leopard
Balega ou Bashebeshe	Kafunzi	Wren
Balinja	Kafunzi	Wren
Balinzi ou Babulinzi	Musimbi	Serval
Baloho	Mushiku	Chimpanzee
Baluku	Hungwe	Crow
Balumbu	Mbogo	Buffalo
Banjoga	Hungwe	Crow
Banyakaduma	Mfuko	Mole
Banyacianga	Kabwa	Dog
Banyacidaha	Cibiribiri	Owl
Banyacivula	Lumve	Chameleon
Banyacivuno	Cibiribiri	Owl
Banyacoya	Musimbi	Serval
Banyakabwa	Kabwa	Dog
Banyakadusi	Nyange	Ibis
Banyalenge	Ngwi	Leopard
Banyalunu	Cibiribiri	Owl
Banyalwenge	Nyambwe	Jackal
Banyalwizi	Kabwa	Dog
Banyamahanzi	Luzige	Grasshopper
Banyamalindye	Kabwa	Dog
Banyambala	Kafaa	Civet
Banyambiriri	Ngulube	Pig
Banyamubira	Hungwe	Crow
Banyamukali	Cikere	Toad
Banyamungere	Nkafu	Cow
Banyamwoca	Ngwi	Leopard
Banyanguru	Musherebera	Lizard
Banyehya	Kabwa	Dog
Banyibamba	Musimbi	Serval
Banyihoka ou Bazimule	Ngwi	Leopard
Banyintu The Banyintu are a clan of Ntwali warriors	Nyange	Ibis
Banyitumu	Nyambwe	Jackal
Banyihi	Kabwa	Dog
Banyungu	Muhangali	Grey crowned crane
Barhana	Hungwe	Crow
Barhembo	Njuzi	Tiger cat
Barhungu	Lumve	Chameleon
Barhungurhwa	Cinonera	Grey grasshopper
Basarazi	Igu	Python
Bashangwa	Njuzi	Tiger cat
Bashanja	Kafunzi	Wren
Basheke ou Banyalugono	Musheke	Green grasshopper
Bashimbi	Lubaka	Sparrowhawk
Bashinjahavu ou Beega	Cikere	Toad
Bashoho	Cikere	Toad
Basibula	Njuzi	Tiger cat
Basibula-bahande	Lutangulira	Spider
Batanga	Kabwa	Dog
Batumba ou Balambo	Ngwi	Leopard
Batwalushuli	Nyange	Ibis
Baziralo	Mbukule	Antelope
Bazirampene	Mpene	Goat
Bishaza	Kabwa	Dog
Bwozi (Basose ou Banyankole)	Ngwi	Leopard

== History ==
The origins of the Shi people can be traced back to the Bantu migrations in Central Africa. According to oral traditions, the Shi established centralized kingdoms in the Kivu region several centuries before European colonization. The Shi kingdom, known as the Kingdom of Bushi, was one of the most structured kingdoms in eastern Democratic Republic of the Congo, with traditional rulers (Bami) who are still recognized today.

Under Belgian colonial rule, the Shi region underwent administrative reorganization, the expansion of Christian missions, and economic exploitation, particularly in the fields of agriculture and mining. Despite these changes, Shi traditional institutions retained considerable influence.

=== Origin of the name Munyabungo ===
According to Rwandan historian Alexis Kagame, the term Munyabungo (or Banyabungo), referring to the inhabitants of Bushi, originated from historical conflicts between Rwanda and Bushi. Kagame explains:

“The Rwandans nicknamed the kingdom of Bushi 'Bunyabungo' and its inhabitants 'Banyabungo' to mean 'Strong Country, courageous and valiant warriors', following several unsuccessful attempts by Rwanda to conquer it.”

=== Historical conflicts between Rwanda and Bushi ===
First war (1388)

During the reign of Mwami Nsoro I of Rwanda and Mwami Nnabushi Kamome of Bushi, Rwandan forces crossed the Ruzizi River and attacked Bushi as far as Cirunga. The Bushi army successfully repelled the invasion, killing the Rwandan commanders Ndahiro II and Ruganzu II, and capturing the royal drum (Kalinga), the symbol of Rwandan royal power.

Second war (c. 1604–1610)

Approximately three centuries later, King Kigeli II Nyamuheshera of Rwanda attempted to avenge the previous defeats. His army was surrounded and completely annihilated by the Kabera warriors of Bushi.

Third war (c. 1766–1770)

The Rwandan army suffered another decisive defeat, and its commander Kimana, son of Kabajyonjya, was killed.

The wars of Rwabugiri (1873)

King Rwabugiri Kigeli IV of Rwanda launched a campaign to conquer Bushi, which he regarded as the principal obstacle to Rwandan domination of the western Lake Kivu region. His commander Rwanyonga initially succeeded in occupying the center of Bushi at Mbiza (Kabare), forcing King Rutaganda of Bushi to retreat to Luhwinja. However, the Shi counteroffensive led by Mutaruba was devastating. Rwabugiri withdrew beyond Lake Kivu and declared a year of mourning for his fallen soldiers, while Shi forces occupied part of Rwandan territory.

=== Legacy of the name ===
As documented by Alexis Kagame, the names Bunyabungo (for the country) and Banyabungo (for the people) persisted in Rwandan oral tradition as a tribute to the military strength and resistance of Bushi.

== Agriculture ==
The Bashi practice subsistence agriculture. It benefits from the proximity of volcanic areas, whose soil is highly fertile, as well as from the region's climate. Thus, in Bushi, two harvests a year can be obtained for staple crops. These mainly include beans, maize, sorghum, potatoes (potatoes and sweet potatoes), yam, and others. Cassava is one of the most widespread crops.

On average, each family has a vegetable garden in which it grows various types of vegetables. Banana cultivation is particularly widespread. In rural areas, each household has its own fields and banana plantation. There are several types of bananas, serving different purposes. One type of banana is used to produce the local alcoholic beverage, known as Kasigsi. Another type is intended to be eaten as a fruit, while another can be cooked and eaten as a side dish or as a substitute for potatoes. Plantains are another type and are intended to be cooked either when ripe or while still green.

== Livestock farming ==
Cows are the most widely raised livestock. They represent both wealth for the family and a marker of social status. Since the regimes that have governed the Congo did not promote banking investment, the Bashi learned to convert their assets into cattle. Thus, the number of cows one owns provides a visible indication of social status. During marriage ceremonies, a young fiancé is expected to offer cattle as a bride price to his future in-laws.

Cattle are also raised for milk. Milk is consumed fresh or processed into cheese. The most common variety is a fresh cheese known as Mashanza.

The Bashi are also enthusiastic breeders of goats, chickens, and small livestock such as rabbits. In recent decades, pig farming has also increased.

Livestock serves both as a store of value and a means of exchange, as well as a source of food.

== Commerce ==
Commerce plays an important role in the economic life of the Bashi. They are known for their strong involvement in commercial activities, making trade one of the sectors traditionally associated with their economic dynamism. In the Democratic Republic of the Congo, the Bashi are considered one of the most advanced and entrepreneurial groups in this field.

Historically, commercial activities have developed both in rural areas of Bushi and in the major urban centers of eastern Congo, particularly Bukavu and Goma. Bashi merchants are active in retail and wholesale trade, agriculture and the marketing of agricultural products, livestock, transportation, real estate, and various service industries.

This commercial tradition has also expanded beyond Bushi. The presence of Bashi communities in different regions of the Democratic Republic of the Congo, particularly in Kinshasa.

Commerce is therefore, alongside agriculture, livestock farming, and entrepreneurship, one of the main pillars of the Bashi economy. This strong commercial culture is often associated with the importance placed on individual initiative, family investment, and the gradual accumulation of wealth.

== Culture ==
The Bashi have a diverse cultural tradition. Their literature gained recognition through the writings of Abbé Kagaragu Ntabaza. His major work, Emigani bali bantu, is a collection of proverbs. He recorded thousands of them, covering virtually every aspect of life, including justice, family, spirituality, the economy, education, and social relations.

Distribution of the Shi (Bashi) ethnic group in the Democratic Republic of the Congo

=== Traditional culture ===
Traditional Shi culture is closely related to that of the populations of the Great Lakes region. A monarchy centered on the figure of the Mwami originally ruled, assisted by a consultative council of elders (Bajinji) and provinces governed by princes (Baluzi). Traditional belief in a single God, Nnamahanga, oral traditions, the language (Mashi), proverbs, songs, bells, percussion instruments, emijegreza, drums, and dances such as eNtole and aKashendo hold an important place in Shi culture, which is strongly influenced by stories of kings and warriors as well as agricultural activities, including livestock farming, agriculture, hunting, and gathering.

The cow (enkafu) and milk (amarha), the spear (itumu), Mashanza, the hoe (enfuka), the bow, banana beer (akasigisi), woven baskets, cattle hides, the leopard, animal totems, and other elements are markers of Congolese Shi culture.

Ironworking is one of the major traditional crafts practiced by the Shi, who have also worked copper for centuries. This was particularly developed in Kaziba, where metal was historically produced and exported to neighboring kingdoms such as Rwanda and Burundi. Objects made of wood, clay, and plant materials were also characteristic of everyday life. Today, imported metal and plastic goods have largely replaced many of these traditional materials.

Until the beginning of the colonial period, clothing made from tree bark or animal skins was common among ordinary Shi people. During the colonial period, Western-style clothing gradually replaced these traditional garments. After independence, the vast majority of the population increasingly adopted brightly colored cotton cloth, particularly wax print fabrics.

Marriage ceremonies remain an important occasion for maintaining traditional practices. The bride price is traditionally assessed partly in cattle and is paid by the groom to the bride's parents. It may include cattle, hoes, clothing for the parents, goats, beer, and other goods.

Traditional Shi medicine, largely based on medicinal plants, remains practiced despite the integration and widespread use of Western medicine.

=== Colonial influence ===
Traditional Shi culture was strongly influenced by Belgian colonial rule until 1960, by Christian churches, particularly the Catholic Church, and by the Congo Wars and the Kivu conflicts.

=== Impact of invasions and the Congo and Kivu wars on the Bashi population and culture ===
The wars that have affected eastern Democratic Republic of the Congo since 1996 have profoundly disrupted Shi society in the Kivu region. Before colonial rule, the Bashi were organized into warrior kingdoms, particularly around Kabare. After independence, and as their connection with this military history weakened, they developed an identity increasingly associated with peacefulness, agriculture, livestock farming, commerce, entrepreneurship, and education.

With the Rwandan, Ugandan and Burundian invasions, followed by massacres, sexual violence and claims of genocide, the Congo Wars and Kivu conflicts disrupted this trajectory. The Kivu region, as a border area, experienced massive population displacement, the destruction of villages, and massacres, notably in Lemera, Kavumu, Minova, Kalehe, Bukavu, Goma, and elsewhere. The Shi population suffered heavy civilian and economic losses.

Faced with insecurity, many young Bashi joined the FARDC and self-defense groups to defend their communities and hills, creating tension between an inherited ideal of peace and the perceived need for self-protection.

Since the 2010s, debate surrounding the expression "Congolese genocide" has been prominent in parts of Shi society. The expression is used to denounce the scale of civilian deaths and what its proponents describe as a lack of international recognition, with the Bashi being described as among the groups heavily affected by the conflicts.
