= Gasmeth Energy Gas Works =

- Location within Rwanda
- Location: Gisenyi, Lake Kivu, Rubavu District, Rwanda, Rwanda; 01°42′33″S 29°14′53″E

Refinery details
- Opened: 2021 (Expected)

The Gasmeth Energy Gas Works (GEGW) is a planned methane gas extraction and processing plant in Rwanda.

== Location ==
The plant would be located on the waters of Lake Kivu, in Rwandan territory, within the vicinity of the city of Gisenyi, approximately 165 kilometres (103 mi), by road, north-west of Kigali, Rwanda's capital and largest city.

== Overview ==
Lake Kivu is reported to contain a considerable amount of methane gas and carbon dioxide, which, when they bubble to the surface, form lethal "toxic clouds". However, when the gases are extracted and canned (bottled), they form vital cooking fuel which replaces scarce firewood and charcoal, thereby preserving the environment. Previous projects have directed the gas towards generation of electricity.

In January 2019, Rwanda's cabinet authorized Rwanda Development Board to enter into a concession with Gasmeth Energy Limited, to extract methane gas for domestic and industrial use as a cooking fuel. On 5 February 2019, agreements were signed, between the Rwanda Development Board (RDB), the Rwanda Mines, Petroleum and Gas Board (RMB) and Gasmeth Energy Limited (GEL), committing GEL to construct a facility on Lake Kivu to extract, process and compress methane gas for the domestic and export market. This is the first major project in the African Great Lakes region for the extraction of methane gas for cooking, on an industrial scale.

== Gasmeth Energy Limited ==
The owner-developers of this project are Gasmeth Energy Limited, a Rwanda-registered company, whose shareholders are as illustrated in the table below.

Gasmeth Energy Limited Stock Ownership
Rank	Name of Owner	Percentage Ownership
1	American Investors	
2	Nigerian Investors	
3	Rwandan Investors	
	Total	100.00

== Construction and funding ==
Gasmeth has committed in writing to invest US$400 million into the construction of the methane gas plant. According to its website, Gasmeth plans to begin operations in 2027.

== See also ==
- Kibuye Power Plant 1
- KivuWatt Power Station
- Kivu 56 Power Station
- Symbion Thermal Power Station
