= Islands of Lake Kivu =

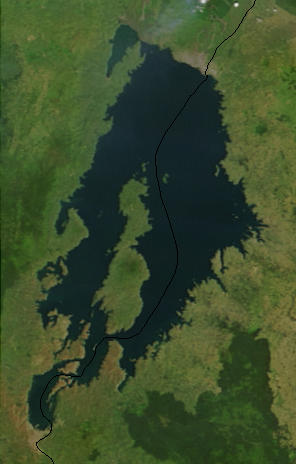
- Idjwi satellite view

Geography
- Location: Lake Kivu, Central Africa
- Democratic Republic of the Congo
- Rwanda

The islands of Lake Kivu are a group of islands located in Lake Kivu, a lake in Central Africa shared between the Democratic Republic of the Congo and Rwanda. These islands vary in size and importance, with some being inhabited and others uninhabited.

== Geography ==
Lake Kivu is one of the African Great Lakes. It contains several islands distributed between its two shores:

• western side (larger part and majority of the islands): Democratic Republic of the Congo.

• eastern side: Rwanda. Some islands are volcanic, others come from sedimentary formations.

== Idjwi Island (main island) ==
Idjwi Island is the largest island in Lake Kivu, the largest island of the Democratic Republic of the Congo, the second largest lake island in Africa, and one of the most populated in Africa. It forms, together with other small islands in the lake, an archipelago known as the Idjwi archipelago.

== Population and activities ==
The inhabited islands of Lake Kivu are mainly populated by fishing communities, farmers, and cattle herders. Economic activities The islands are divided among several chiefdoms including the chiefdom of Kabare, the chiefdom of Rubenga, the chiefdom of Ntambuka, and the chiefdom of Buhavu. The inhabitants of the islands are ethnically Shi. The language spoken on the islands is Mashi or Amashi.

== Islands in the Democratic Republic of the Congo ==
Island	Size	Population
Idjwi Island	~340 km²	~300,000 inhabitants (estimate)
Bugarula Island	-	-
Tshibati Island	-	-
Tchegera Island	-	-
Nyakizi Island	-	-
Ntaligera Island 1	-	-
Mukondwe Island 1	-	-
Mukondwe Island 2	-	-
Tchugi Island	-	-
Birhembe Island	-	-
Shushu Island 1	-	-
Shushu Island 2	-	-
Nyamizi Island	-	-
Ibinja Island	-	-
Cinyabalanga Island	-	-
Irhe Island	-	-
Iko Island	-	-
Cheya Island	-	-
Ihoka Island	-	-
Ishovu Island	-	-

== Islands in Rwanda ==
Island	Size	Population
Nkombo Island	~20–25 km² (estimate)	~15,000 to 20,000 inhabitants
Napoleon Island	~0.5 km² (estimate)	Uninhabited
Amahoro Island	Very small	Uninhabited
Monkey Island	Very small	Uninhabited (presence of primates)
Iwawa		
