= Kashofu Institute =

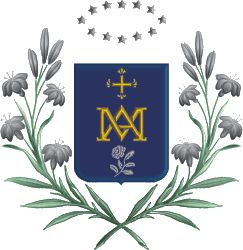

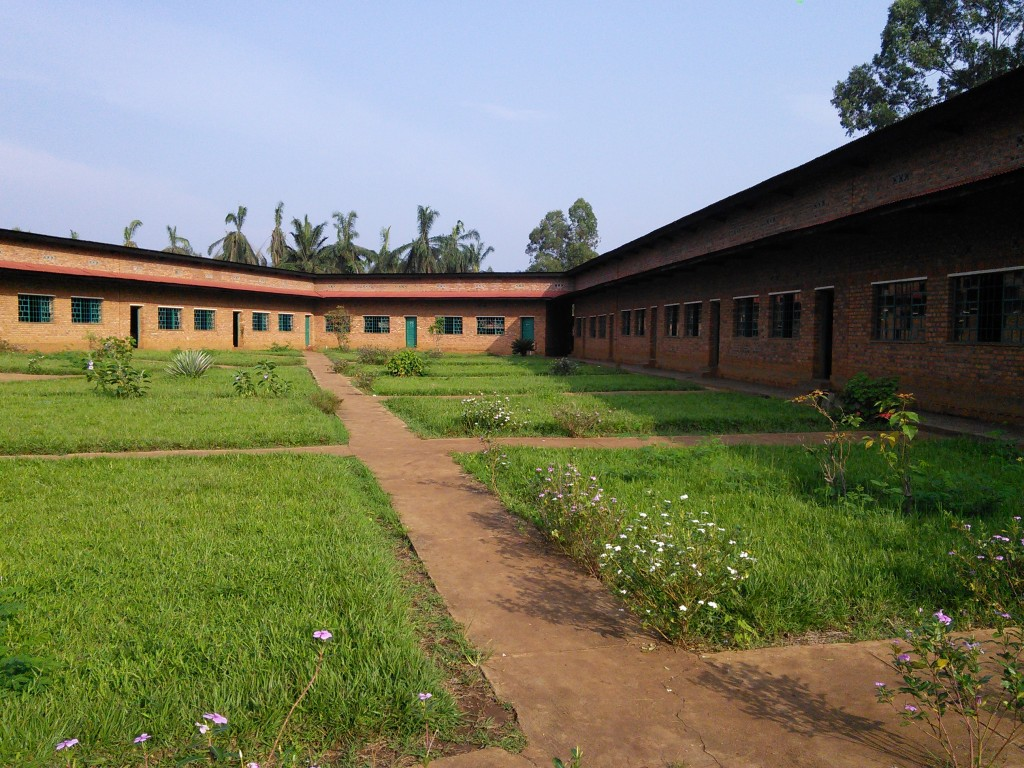
- Photo of Kashofu Institute in 2013

Location
- Kashofu; Democratic Republic of the Congo; Democratic Republic of the Congo

Information
- Type: Catholic convention school
- Motto: Always Aim for Excellence
- Established: 3 July 1990
- Principal: Sister Darleine (2021-present)
- Staff: 46
- Language: French
- Affiliations: Company of Mary Our Lady

The Kashofu Institute is a Catholic secondary education institution located on the island of Idjwi, in the Democratic Republic of the Congo. It was founded in 1990 by the Archdiocese of Bukavu and has been run by the Company of Mary Our Lady sisters since 1993. The school is coeducational and has two boarding facilities.

== Location ==
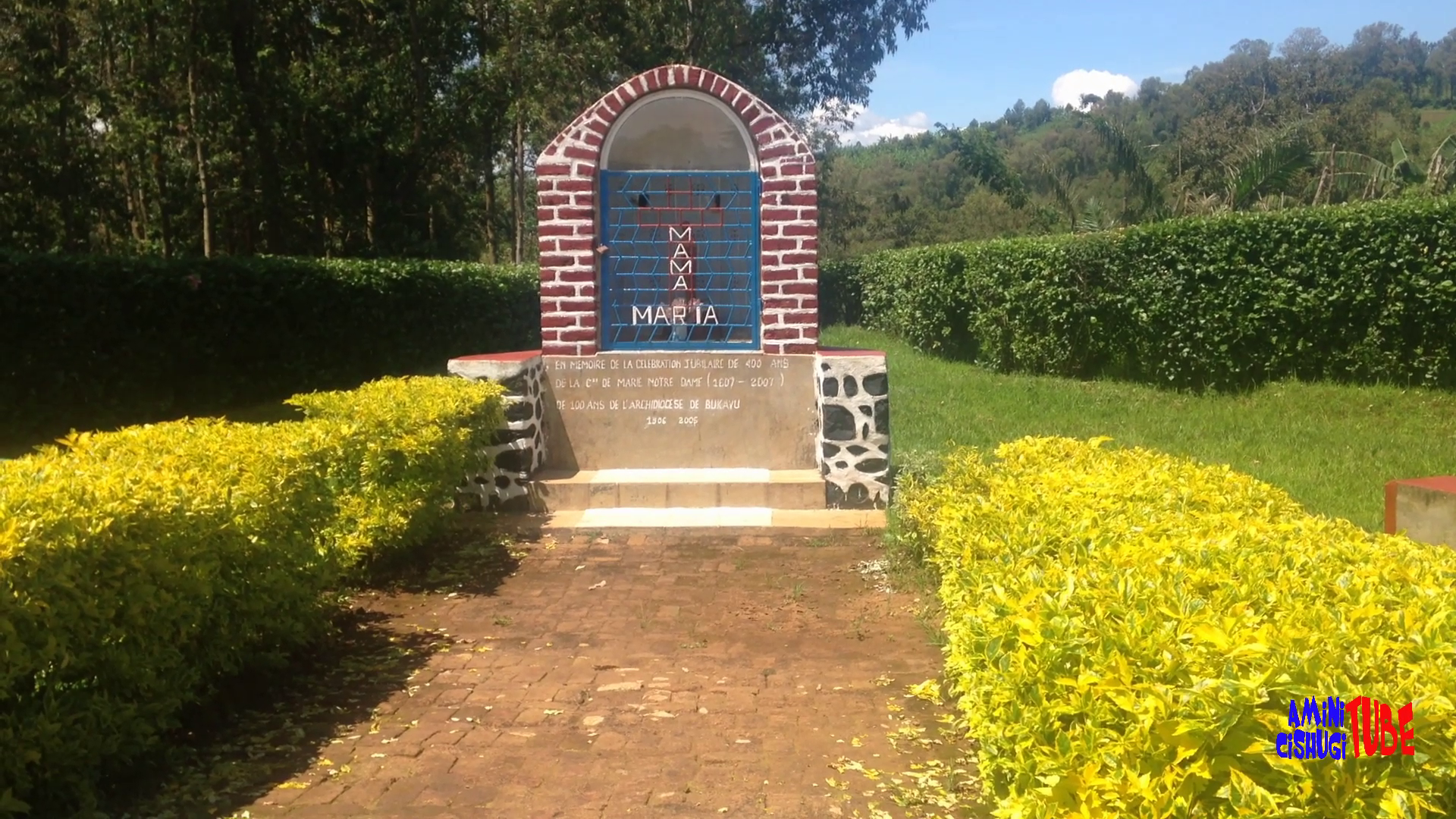
The Kashofu cave in front of the Kashofu Institute in 2019.

The Kashofu Institute is situated in the southern part of the island of Idjwi on the shores of Lake Kivu.

== History ==
The Kashofu Institute was established to address the numerous challenges on the island where families, deeply rooted in traditional culture, did not recognize the importance of education, particularly for girls.

In 1990, the parish of Kashofu created a coeducational Catholic school with only two options before 2016 (general education and chemical biology). It was handed over to the Company of Mary Our Lady in 1993.

== Mission ==
The Kashofu Institute works towards the holistic development of young people in cooperation with the parish and following an educational project: pedagogical meetings and SERNAFOR activities, collaboration between laypeople and religious members, attention to the most disadvantaged students, promotion of secondary and higher education among youth, particularly girls. Everyone is encouraged to participate in parish activities and Catholic action movements.

== Organized sections ==
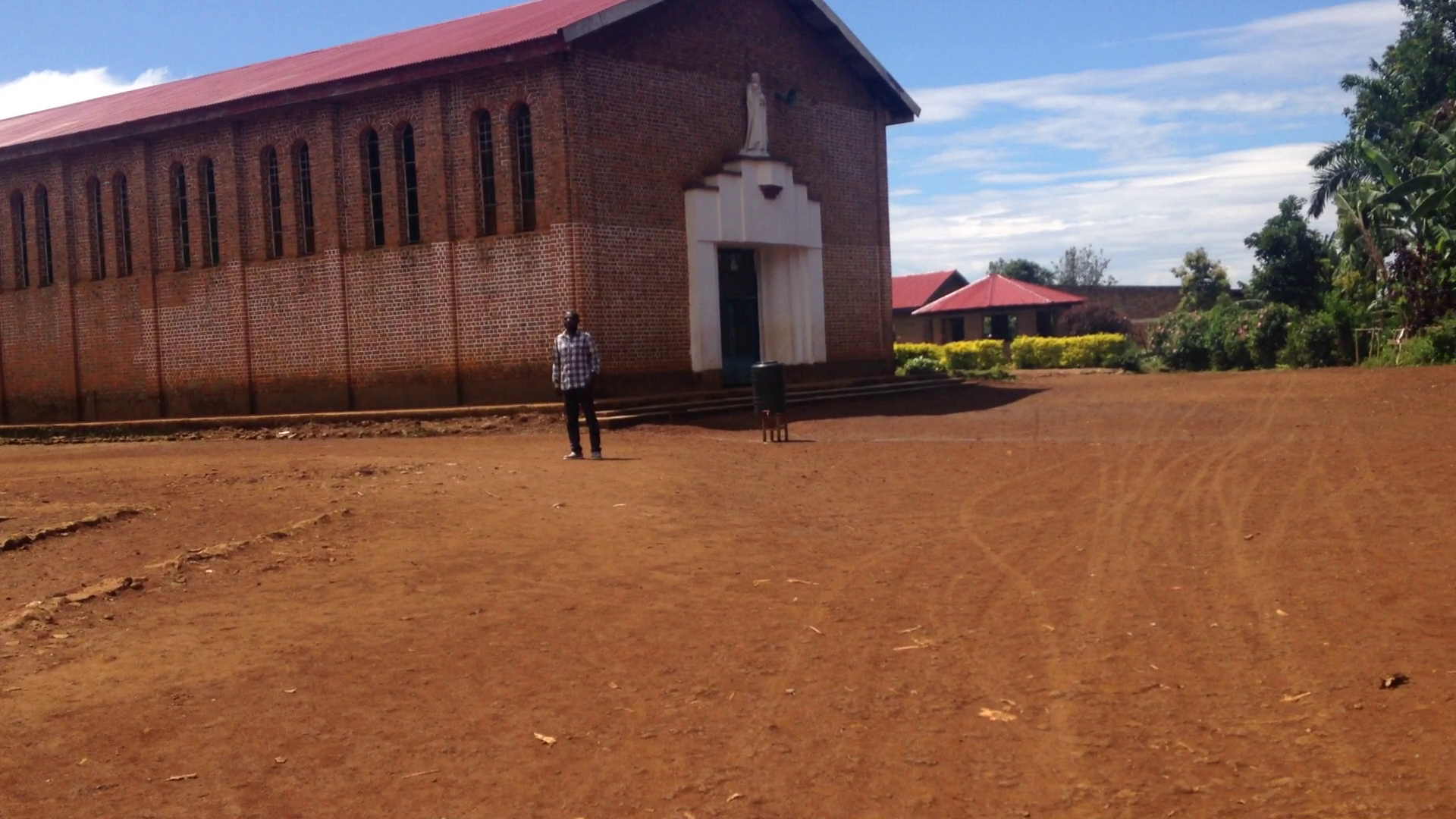
The Kashofu parish.

- General Pedagogy
- Scientific Chemistry - Biology
- Commercial and Management Technology

== Principals ==
Sisters Principals of the Kashofu Institute

Period	Principal
Since 2010	Sr. Adrienne Muhindo Lwashiga

== Notable alumni ==
- Amini Cishugi, Congolese writer
