= Kibuye Power Plant 1 =

Power station in Rwanda

- Country: Rwanda
- Location: Kibuye
- Coordinates: 02°03′21″S 29°20′18″E
- Status: Operational
- Commission date: 2008
- Owner: Government of Rwanda

Thermal power station
- Primary fuel: Methane

Power generation
- Nameplate capacity: 3.6 MW (4,800 hp)

Kibuye Power Plant 1, also Kibuye Thermal Power Station 1 (KP1), is a 3.6 megawatts (4,800 hp) methane gas-fired thermal power plant in Rwanda.

== Location ==
The power plant is located in Kibuye, Karongi District, in the Western Province of Rwanda, approximately 135 kilometres (84 mi), by road, west of Kigali, the capital and largest city in that country.

== Overview ==
Starting in 2006, with partial financing from the International Finance Corporation (IFC), the government of Rwanda began sourcing for qualified engineering firms to design, build and operate a methane gas-powered electricity generating power plant, using gas extracted from the depths of Lake Kivu. One of the objectives of this project, was to prove that it was possible to generate electricity from methane gas in the lake in on a profitable commercial basis. The project cost an estimated US$20 million to set up.

== Ownership ==
The project is majority owned by the Rwandan government. A partnership with Dane Associates, an Edinburgh-based enterprise broke up over financial disagreements. In 2015, with the project unable to pay its debts, the Rwanda Commercial High Court dissolved the Kibuye Power 1 Company, at the request of the government of Rwanda. The government began to accept bids from new investors to restart the project.

In October 2016, Symbion Power, an American electricity-generating enterprise, acquired Kibuye Power Plant 1 at an undisclosed sum of money. Symbion plans a gradual, phased upgrade of capacity, first to 25 MW in 2018, and to 50 MW in 2019.

== Other considerations ==
Kibuye Power Plant 1 is the second power project Symbion has committed to develop on Lake Kivu. It has also agreed to develop Kivu 56 Power Station, a 56 megawatts (75,000 hp), methane-powered electricity-generating plant. Under that agreement, the first 14 megawatts (19,000 hp) are expected in 2018.

== See also ==
- Rwanda Power Stations
- Africa Power Stations
- Energy in Rwanda
- Karongi District
- Western Rwanda
