= Jean-Chrysostome Weregemere =

Congolese politician (born 1919)

Minister of Agriculture of the Republic of the Congo
- In office 2 August 1961 – 11 July 1962
- President: Joseph Kasa-Vubu
- Prime Minister: Cyrille Adoula

Minister of Justice of the Republic of the Congo
- In office 11 July 1962 – 7 December 1962
- Preceded by: Rémy Mwamba

Member of the Chamber of Deputies for South Kivu
- In office 1960–1964

Personal details
- Born: 5 September 1919 Katana, Kabare Territory, Kivu, Belgian Congo
- Party: Centre du Regroupement Africain; Rassemblement de l'Est du Congo; Mouvement Populaire de la Révolution
- Children: 9

Jean-Chrysostome Weregemere or Weregemere Bingwa Nyalumeke (born 5 September 1919) was a Congolese politician who led a faction of the Centre du Regroupement Africain. He served as Minister of Agriculture in the Congolese government from August 1961 until July 1962 and then as Minister of Justice until December 1962. Weregemere later held prominent positions in parastatals and sat on the central committee of the Mouvement Populaire de la Révolution from 1980 until 1985.

Weregemere was born in Kivu Province, Belgian Congo. After studying with various Catholic institutions and taking courses in medicine, he entered the workforce, but frequently ran afoul of the colonial authorities for engaging in political activities. In 1958 he cofounded the Centre du Regroupement Africain (CEREA), a political party. He successfully expanded its influence and became its secretary-general, but continued to face challenges from the Belgian administration. In early 1960 he accused the leadership of CEREA of communist sympathies and created a splinter party. In the Congo's first free elections later that year Weregemere won a seat in the Chamber of Deputies. In August 1961 he was appointed Minister of Agriculture. In July 1962 Prime Minister Cyrille Adoula reorganised his government and Weregemere was made Minister of Justice. The appointment was not well received by the public, and following attempts by the Adoula Government to arrest members of Parliament, Weregemere was removed from his office by a motion of censure in the Chamber in December.

During President Joseph-Désiré Mobutu's tenure, Weregemere was given many board positions on various parastatals. In September 1980 he was inducted into the central committee of the state-sponsored party, the Mouvement Populaire de la Révolution, where he served until his expulsion in 1985, allegedly for opposing a government appointment. He was thereafter banished to a remote farm in his home region and was restricted to leave to seek treatment for glaucoma. Following a measure of political liberalisation in the early 1990s, he reestablished CEREA and took part in the Conference Nationale Souveraine to discuss the restoration of democracy.

== Biography ==
=== Early life ===
Jean-Chrysostome Weregemere was born on 5 September 1919 to a Muhavu family in Katana (near Kabaré), Kivu, Belgian Congo. He received his primary education in Bukavu from Catholic missionaries until he was twelve. He then studied via correspondence at a minor seminary in Katanga for four years. He studied medicine for two years and at the age of 21 took up work as a clerk in the Bukavu court of justice. He remained there until he was drafted by the administration for service during World War II. Since he had engaged in political activity, the Force Publique refused to enlist him; he was assigned a role in the war production effort. In 1948 Werengemere was fired from his job for involvement in politics. Unable to find to work in the Congo, he moved his family to Ruanda-Urundi where he was hired by a small accounting firm. He eventually became the president of a small sports and cultural organisation. In 1956 Werengemere was expelled from Ruanda-Urundi for political activity and returned to Kivu. He threatened to turn his family (including seven children; he would have nine in total) over to the care of the colonial authorities unless they allowed him to find work. The administration in turn asked him to promise to abstain from politics. Weregemere gave them an ambivalent answer but nevertheless was able to become an accountant. In 1958 Bralima Brewery in Bukavu hired him as an agent.

=== Leader of CEREA ===
On 23 August 1958 Weregemere joined 11 other Congolese in forming the Centre du Regroupement Africain (CEREA) party. Party members nominated him as chairman of the sectional committee for Bukavu and as a member of the political bureau, and he was appointed secretary of peasant affairs. He then successfully established a CEREA chapter in Kasongo. In 1959 Weregemere became secretary-general of the party, and in that capacity he led CEREA's delegation to the Pan-African Movement for Eastern and Central Africa conference in Dar es Salaam. That year all 12 founders of CEREA were arrested but eventually released. In late October a nationalist party congress was convened in Stanleyville. Weregemere led the CEREA delegation and was elected vice-president of the conference. Civil unrest followed the congress and he was arrested and imprisoned. He was released in Stanleyville, where he was closely monitored for six weeks. In late 1959 municipal elections took place across the Congo and Weregemere's name was inserted into the lists for the Bukavu council election. He encouraged the public to boycott the elections, but his wife—taking his place on the ballot—was elected in December by a wide margin in his place.

Weregemere attended the Belgo-Congolese Round Table Conference in early 1960, but appeared later than the rest of the CEREA delegation. Upon his arrival he was disappointed to learn that the other delegates had employed a Communist adviser and endorsed federalism (contrary to the official party plank supporting a unitary system). In April Werengemere accused the president and vice-president of CEREA of harbouring Communist sympathies and organised his own moderate branch of the party, CEREA-Werengemere. It failed to secure the endorsement of CEREA's central committee and did not amass substantial popular support.

=== Government career ===
"Lumumba had not taken him as a minister because I had advised him against it...However, Lumumba appreciates the spirit of this wise and certainly intelligent man...Weregemere speaks provocatively and provokingly, which makes him unpopular. He is criticised for being egocentric..."

— Anicet Kashamura's thoughts on Weregemere (translated from French)

In the Congo's first elections later that year Weregemere earned a seat in the Chamber of Deputies, representing the South Kivu District on the Rassemblement de l'Est du Congo (RECO/REKO) party ticket with 2,721 preferential votes. He accompanied Prime Minister Patrice Lumumba on his trip to the United Nations Headquarters in July as his appointed Commissioner of Public Relations. In August he led Lumumba's economic delegation to the United States. He spent four weeks in the country, meeting with dozens of representatives of private organisations, foundations, banks, business firms, as well as United States government officials and delegates of the International Monetary Fund. In September 1960 relations between Lumumba and President Joseph Kasa-Vubu broke down, creating a political impasse. Werengemere was placed on the parliamentary commission created to try and reconcile the two and acted as its spokesperson. (Note: The commission exacted a promise from Lumumba to govern under the supervision of another parliamentary commission of which Weregemere was designated to be a member. The plan never materialised.) In October he was made a member of a commission assembled by Lumumba tasked with managing his relations with the United Nations Operation in the Congo.

Fearing for his life in the capital, Léopoldville, amidst the declining political atmosphere, Weregemere fled to Bukavu on 9 January 1961. He was then detained, tortured by the local authorities, and imprisoned in Stanleyville. When Weregemere returned to Léopoldville he was arrested. Shortly thereafter he was released to testify before a UN conciliation commission. He then went back to Stanleyville and became Minister of Information in the government of the rebellious Free Republic of the Congo, which tasked him with restoring order in Kivu in June.

Following the Lovanium Conclave in July, a measure of reconciliation was reached between some of the Congo's major factions. On 2 August 1961 Weregemere was made Minister of Agriculture in Prime Minister Cyrille Adoula's new coalition government. From 23 September to 5 October he led an agricultural fact-finding mission to the Republic of China. In November he attended the 11th session of the Food and Agriculture Organization Conference in Rome. On 11 July 1962 Adoula reorganised his government and made Weregemere Minister of Justice. The appointment proved unpopular throughout the country, and there were fears in Bukavu that it would lead to the reemergence of a radical polity.

In November the Adoula Government decreed a state of military rule and arrested four deputies on charges of plotting rebellion. The Chamber was furious; on 23 November the body forced the government to rescind its actions. Seven days later Weregemere submitted a request to the Chamber Bureau for authorisation to indict Deputy Christophe Gbenye on charges of subversion for allegedly appealing to President Kwame Nkrumah of Ghana to send him troops to support his political activities. On 4 December a parliamentary committee was formed to investigate the claim. On 7 December it delivered its report to the Chamber, its members unanimously rejecting the allegation. That same day the Chamber called upon Weregemere to face a motion of censure for conducting arbitrary arrests of parliamentarians contrary to the constitution and thereby generating tension between Parliament and the government. Though he pointed out that the November arrests had been conducted by the Ministry of Interior, the motion was passed, 76 votes to four with four abstentions, and he was dismissed. The following year he led the Belgian delegation in negotiations on the Belgo-Congolese contentieux—litigation concerning outstanding financial matters following decolonisation. On 30 May 1964 he was appointed the central government's Minister-Resident in Stanleyville to oversee the activities of the Orientale provincial government. He was relieved of his duties in July 1964.

=== Later life ===
Under President Joseph-Désiré Mobutu's rule, Weregemere was appointed Administrator of Parastatal Companies, and Government Representative on the board of directors of Joint Ventures. He successively served as a member of the board of directors of the Office des Mines de Kilo Moto, (Note: Mulumba and Makombo wrote that Weregemere was given this position on 14 September 1966, while the executive order announcing the appointment is dated 9 September 1968 by the government gazette, Moniteur Congolais.) managing director of the Office des Mines de Kilo Moto, managing director of the Office des transports au Congo, (Note: According to Gretton, Weregemere was at first appointed to the board of the Office on 27 January 1971.) vice-chairman of the board of directors of the Institut de Gestion du Portefeuille in charge of the mining sector, and director general of the Société Africaine d'Explosifs.

Weregemere joined the central committee of the state-sponsored party, the Mouvement Populaire de la Révolution, on 2 September 1980. He served in its premier bureau as second vice-president. On 30 September 1985 he was expelled from the central committee. (Note: Mulumba and Makombo wrote that Weregemere served in the central committee until October.) According to Weregemere, this was because he opposed the government's choice for a new mwami in Kabaré. He was subsequently banished to a remote farm in Katana. Though by then he suffered from glaucoma, the government refused to allow him to undergo eye surgery. As a result, Amnesty International adopted him as a prisoner of conscience and called for his release. In the early 1990s Mobutu, after years of totalitarian rule, agreed to institute political reforms in the Congo. With the possibility of renewed elections in Kivu, Weregemere joined a former colleague in reestablishing CEREA. He also became president of the national committee of the Union des Sociaux Nationalistes. He participated in the subsequent Conference Nationale Souveraine as a member of the commission to oversee the national political transition towards democracy.
