= Kivu 56 Power Station =

Power station in Rubavu, Western, Rwanda

- Location of Kivu 56 Power Station in Rwanda
- Country: Rwanda
- Location: Nyamyumba
- Coordinates: 01°48′09″S 29°16′50″E
- Status: Operational
- Commission date: 2022
- Owner: Symbion Power

Thermal power station
- Primary fuel: Methane gas

Power generation
- Nameplate capacity: 56 megawatts (75,000 hp)

Symbion Thermal Power Station is a 56 megawatts (75,000 hp) methane gas-fired thermal power plant located at the Cape of Busororo near the town of Nyamyumba in Rubavu District, in the Western Province of Rwanda.

== Location ==
The power station is located at Cape Busoro, near Nyamyumba in Western Rwanda, approximately 163 kilometres (101 mi), by road, northwest of Kigali, the national capital and largest city in the country. This location lies approximately 20 kilometres (12 mi), by road, south of Gisenyi, the provincial capital and nearest large town.

== Overview ==
Kivu 56 Power Station is owned and operated by Symbion Power LLC, a private energy provider headquartered in the United States. The plant consists of two facilities: (a) an off-shore installation which extracts, separates and processes methane gas, which is dissolved in the deep waters of Lake Kivu, and then delivers it to (b) an on-shore generating facility located at Cape of Busororo, where the gas is used to turn gas turbines to generate electricity.

Kivu 56 Power Station is the third methane gas powered power station in Rwanda, after KivuWatt Power Station, which generates 25 MW and is in the process of expanding capacity to 100 MW, and the 3.6 megawatts (4,800 hp) Kibuye Power Plant 1, which is also owned by Symbion and is undergoing phased expansion to 50 megawatts (67,000 hp).

Symbion Power has registered a Rwandan subsidiary company that it owns 100 percent by the name Shema Power Lake Kivu Methane Limited, to design, fund, build, own, operate and maintain the Kivu 56 Power Station. Four gas turbines, each rated at 16 megawatts, power the plant to produce 56 megawatts of clean energy.

== Construction ==
According to the power purchase agreements signed between the relevant parties, the first 14 megawatts (19,000 hp) from this power station, are expected in 2018. In September 2017, Symbion sold US$100 million worth of equity in its two Rwandan projects; namely Kibuye Power Plant 1 and Kivu 56 Power Station. The money will be used to develop both power stations to generate a combined 106 megawatts (142,000 hp). A total of US$370 million is budgeted to fulfill that goal.

== See also ==
- KivuWatt Power Station
- Rwanda Power Stations
- Africa Power Stations
- World Power Stations
