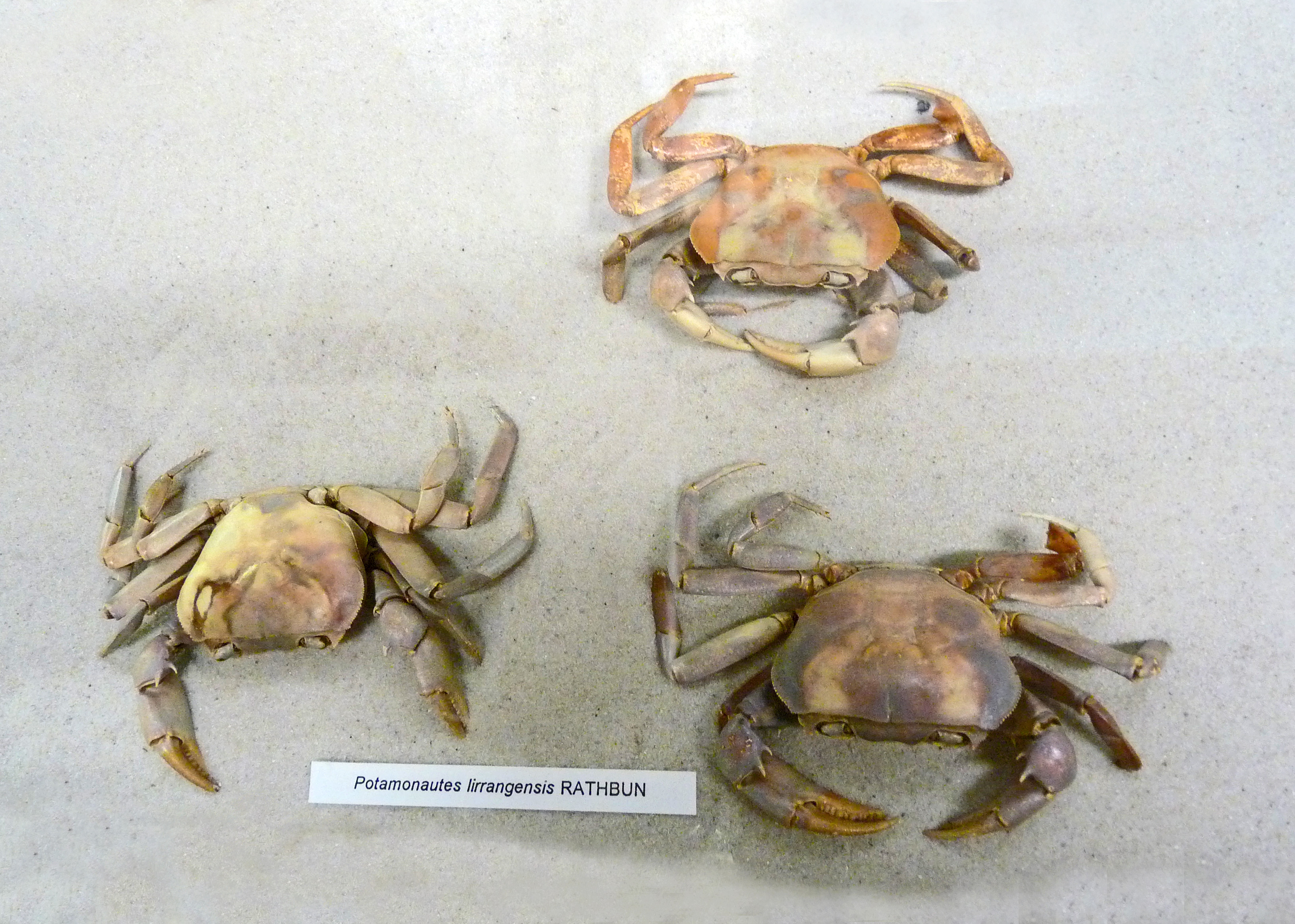
- Museum specimens. Living individuals are typically bluish

Conservation status
- Least Concern (IUCN 3.1)

Scientific classification
- Kingdom: Animalia
- Phylum: Arthropoda
- Clade: Pancrustacea
- Class: Malacostraca
- Order: Decapoda
- Suborder: Pleocyemata
- Infraorder: Brachyura
- Family: Potamonautidae
- Genus: Acanthothelphusa
- Species: A. lirrangensis

Binomial name
- Acanthothelphusa lirrangensis (Rathbun, 1904)

Synonyms
- Potamonautes orbitospinus Cunnington, 1907

= Acanthothelphusa lirrangensis =

Species of crab

Acanthothelphusa lirrangensis, the Malawi blue crab, is a species of freshwater crab in the family Potamonautidae. This common and widespread species is found in Lake Malawi, Lake Kivu, the upper Congo River Basin and Malagarasi River in the Democratic Republic of the Congo, Malawi, Rwanda, and Tanzania. In the freshwater aquarium trade it is sometimes sold under the synonym Potamonautes orbitospinus.
