= Kivu Lacus =

Lake on Titan

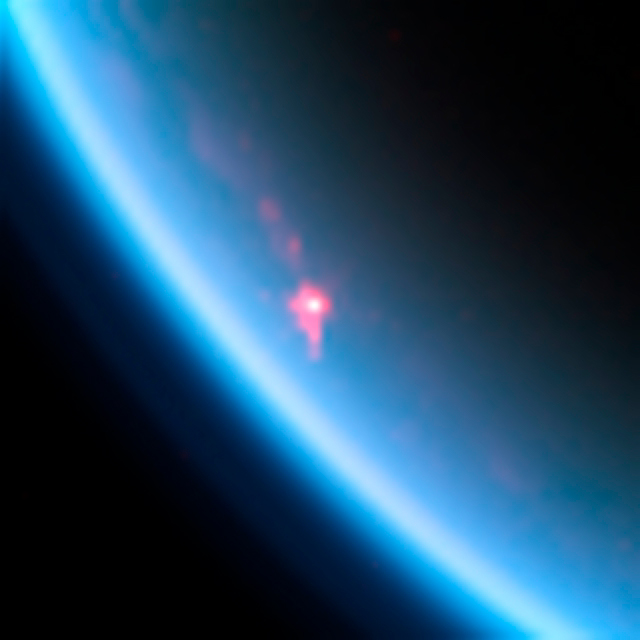
- Infrared sunlight glinting off Kivu Lacus
- Feature type: Lacus
- Coordinates: 87°N 121°W
- Diameter: 77.5 km (48 mi)
- Eponym: Lake Kivu

Kivu Lacus is a small Titanean hydrocarbon lake. It was discovered by the Cassini probe. The lake is near Titan's north pole and is named after Lake Kivu in the Democratic Republic of Congo and Rwanda. In 2012, Cassini spotted an Infrared glint off the lake. The aspects of it suggested waves.

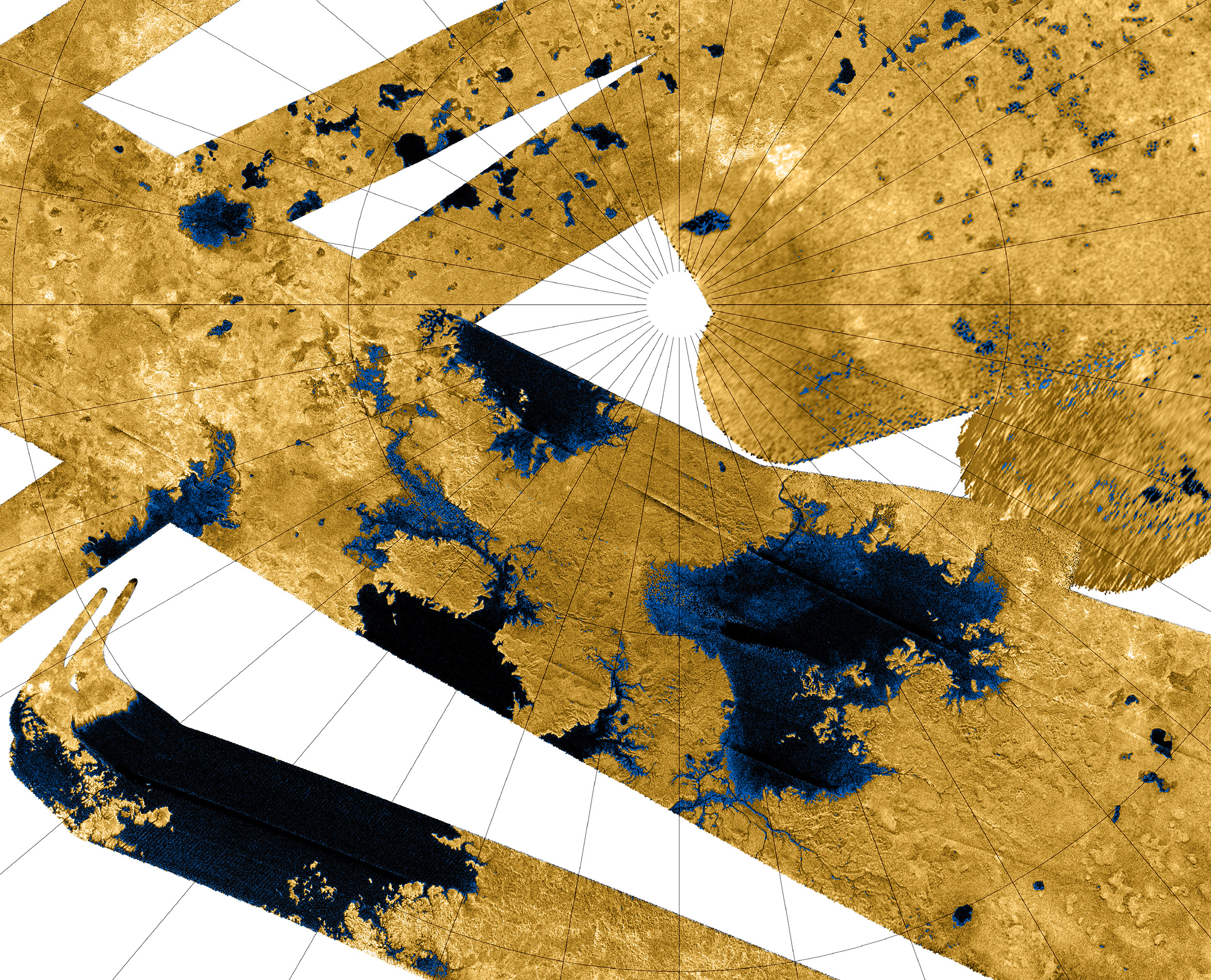
Kivu Lacus is near the center of this image
