= Havu language =

Language

Havu
- Kihavu, Gihavu
- Native to: Democratic Republic of Congo
- Region: Sud-Kivu Province
- Ethnicity: Bahavu
- Native speakers: 510,000 (2002)
- Language family: Niger–Congo?: Atlantic–Congo; Benue–Congo; Bantoid; Bantu; Northeast Bantu; Great Lakes Bantu; Shi–Havu; Havu

Language codes
- ISO 639-3: hav
- Glottolog: havu1238
- Guthrie code: JD.52

Havu (also Haavu, Kihavu, or Gihavu) is a Bantu language of the Democratic Republic of the Congo. It is spoken mainly in the Idjwi and Kalehe territories of Sud-Kivu Province, in the east of the DRC. It is closely related to the Shi language.

The Havu language is also spoken in the city of Goma, north of the island. However, ethnic Havu in Goma are not using the language as much as those on the island of Idjwi.
