= Ntwali =

Ntwali is a surname. Notable people with the surname include:

- Fiacre Ntwali (born 1999), Rwandan footballer
- John Williams Ntwali (1979–2023), Rwandan investigative journalist
- Prince Cokola Ntwali (born 1983), Congolese politician
