= 2013 Kivu Offensive =

Kivu Offensive
Date	October 2013
Location	Kivu Region, Congo
Result	Congolese military victory: End of M23 rebellion, rebels disbanded

Belligerents
(Democratic Republic of the Congo) Democratic Republic of Congo	M23 rebels

Strength
3,800	Hundreds

Casualties and losses
(Democratic Republic of the Congo) 20 DRC soldiers dead, a hundred wounded	Unknown number killed, 1,600 surrender
- 12 civilians dead

The 2013 Kivu offensive refers to actions in the eastern Democratic Republic of Congo by the Congolese army, which captured two towns from M23 rebels: Kiwanja and Buhumba, both of which are in the Rutshuru area of North Kivu province, near the Rwandan border.

In October 2013, Congo told the UN that the M23 movement was virtually finished after being pushed back from its key position at Mount Hehu and Rumanagabo, north of Goma, to an enclave near Rwanda. Congo also re-captured Kiwanja and Rutshuru, where its forces discovered mass graves. On 30 October, Bunagana, the first town seized by the rebels in 2012, was stormed by UN-backed Congolese troops as the rebels abandoned it.

Following Uganda's calls for a ceasefire on 1 November and government shelling the next day, as well as a new offensive on 3 November in the hills around the border with Uganda and Rwanda, M23 leader Bertrand Bisimwa called to "immediately end hostilities". He asked for the facilitator of the Kampala peace talks "to immediately put in place a mechanism to monitor the ceasefire."

The army accused the rebels of bombing Bunagana. Army spokesman Olivier Hamuli said: "This is not fighting, it is bombs launched by M23 targeting the population of Bunagana. They are targeting civilians." Conversely, the rebels said that they were attacked with heavy weapons. Radio Okapi reported that four civilians were killed and 10 others were wounded in Bunagana on 4 November. UN, EU and AU envoys urged both sides not to undo the progress made in peace talks, saying that M23 should renounce its rebellion and the army should hold off from further military action.

The next day, following the two-week UN-backed offensive, the government claimed to have defeated the rebels. M23 representatives said that it was ending its rebellion and would disarm and demobilise its forces in order to pursue a political solution. The announcement came hours after its fighters were driven out of its last two strongholds of Tshanzu and Runyoni at about 3:00.

Bisimiwa issued a statement that read: "The chief of general staff and the commanders of all major units are requested to prepare troops for disarmament, demobilisation and reintegration on terms to be agreed with the government of Congo." Government spokesman Laurent Mende said that many rebel fighters were surrendering and that Congo was ready to pursue peace talks. The U.S. special envoy for the African Great Lakes region said from Pretoria: "In a region that has suffered so much, this is obviously a significant positive step in the right direction." On 6 November 2013, the March 23 rebels fled the country. The next day, the rebels surrendered at Mgahinga Gorilla National Park in Uganda Another 1,500 fighters, believed to be most of the force, were held after surrendering in Kisoro by the borders; they included Sultani Makenga.

At a meeting in Entebbe, Uganda, the Congolese government delegation left the talks after a failure to agree to a wording of a document intended to officially end the insurgency. Government spokesman Lambert Mende said: "Uganda seems now to be acting as part of the conflict. It has interests in M23." At the same time, no dates for talks to resume were set.
