= Kivu Air =

Airline of the Democratic Republic of the Congo

| IATA | ICAO | Call sign |
|---|---|---|
| - | - | - |
- Founded: 1997
- Hubs: Goma International Airport, Bukavu Airport
- Fleet size: 1
- Headquarters: Goma, Democratic Republic of the Congo

Kivu Air is an airline based in Goma, Democratic Republic of the Congo. It operates charter and cargo services in the area. Its main bases are Goma International Airport and Bukavu Airport.

The airline is on the list of air carriers banned in the European Union, with all DRC-approved airlines remaining on the EU safety blacklist as of June 2025.

== History ==
The airline was established and started operations in 1997. It has 27 employees (at March 2007).

== Fleet ==
As of March 2008 the Kivu Air fleet includes:

- 1 Casa C.212-200 Aviocar
