= Idjwi Territory =

Idjwi Wilaya ya Idjwi (Swahili)
- Territory
- Territoire d‘Idjwi
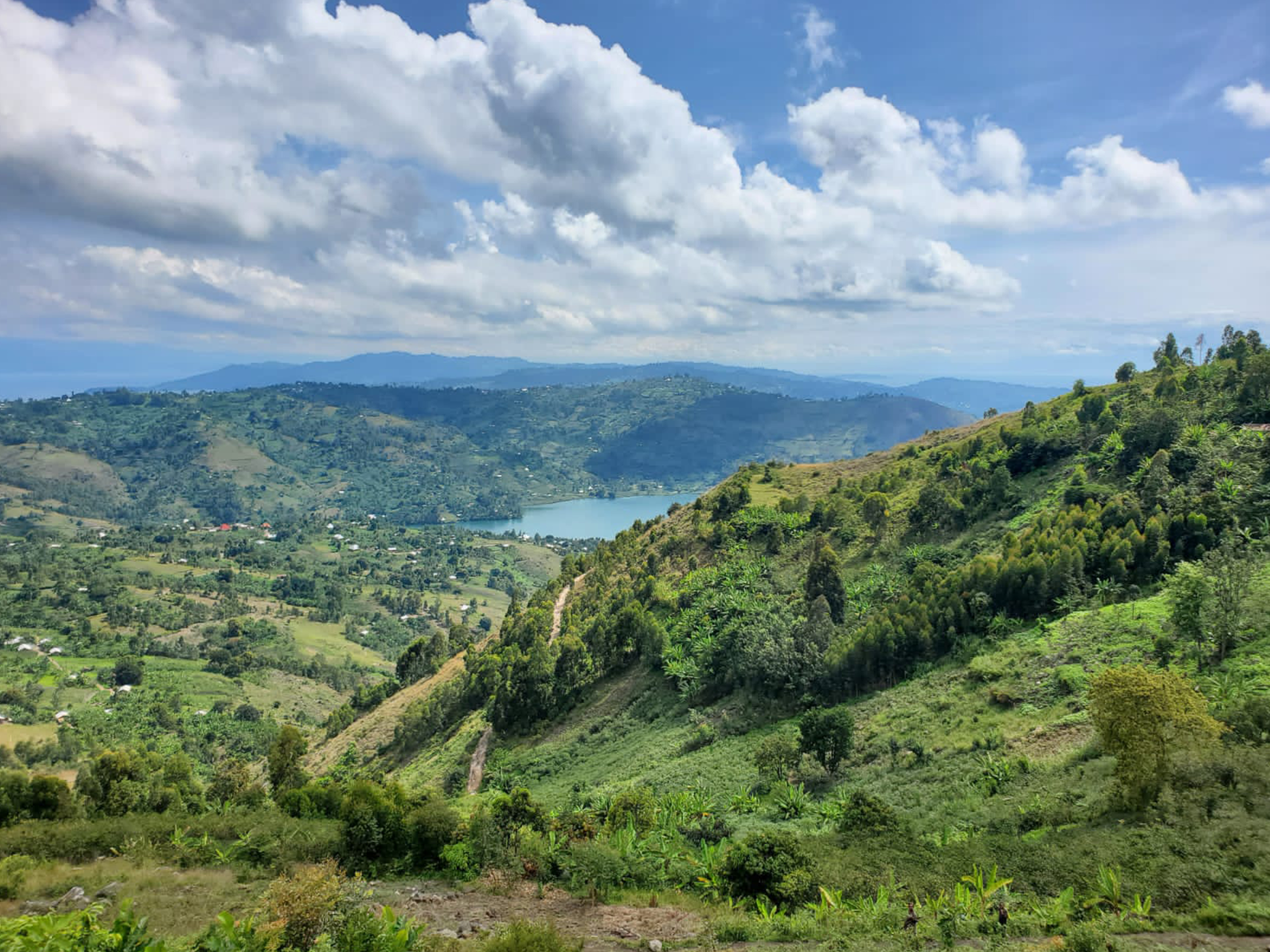
- Interactive map of Idjwi Territory
- Location within Democratic Republic of the Congo
- Coordinates: 2.096527°S 29.033614°E
- Country: DR Congo
- Province: South Kivu
- HQ: Bugarula
- Time zone: UTC+2 (CAT)

Idjwi Territory is a territory in South Kivu, in the eastern Democratic Republic of the Congo. Established in 1974 in response to local demands for administrative recognition, the territory encompasses Idjwi Island, the largest island in Lake Kivu, along with numerous surrounding islets, collectively forming a small archipelago.

The territory lies within the western branch of the Central African Rift Valley, between latitudes 1°33' and 2°30' south and longitudes 28°49' and 29°19' east. Lake Kivu, situated in this section of the rift valley, is located at an altitude of 1,460 meters and spans over 26,000 square kilometers. Idjwi Island itself extends approximately 50 kilometers from north to south and up to 15 kilometers from east to west, with its total area estimated between 307.5 and 310 km^{2}, making up nearly one-ninth of the lake's surface area. The island serves as a natural divide within Lake Kivu, splitting the lake into two branches that reconnect in the northern and southern sections. The northern section is known as the "Great Lake" and forms the lake's deepest basin. The islets surrounding Idjwi Island are grouped into three clusters, with the Kirshanga group comprising Murshuza, Kirshanga, Nyabi, Nyakirirshu, Kabwanga, Kezina, Karubambura, Kazimbaka, Gahengeri, Kabwikulule, Shushu I and II, Kanaka Lahinga, Mpavu Kabunduguhi, Kalunga I and II, Kamashe, and Karwakakaraza. The Burshende group comprises Nyamubibi, Muhova, Burshende, Kishushu, Miku, and Karwakakaraza, while the Nyamizi group contains Muhembe, Nyamizi, Irhe, Cegera, Ibuza, Mushenyi, and Kinyabalanga.

== Geography ==
Idjwi Island, located in Lake Kivu, features a distinctly asymmetrical relief, characterized by steep eastern slopes that contrast with the more gradual inclines on the western side. This topographical asymmetry is attributed to tectonic uplift along a radial fault that runs parallel to the island's eastern shoreline and extends onto the eastern slopes of the Nyamirundi Peninsula in Rwanda. The island forms a small, asymmetrical, and fractured horst, composed mainly of hills and mountainous massifs. At the center of Idjwi Island, the Nyamusisi Massif rises as its highest point at 2,303 meters above sea level, and, along with other elevated areas, is intersected by steep alluvial valleys aligned with fault lines. The coastline is notably indented, forming numerous bays that appear to be ancient, submerged valleys, likely inundated during the formation of Lake Kivu.

The hydrographic system is entirely oriented toward Lake Kivu, which serves as the receiving basin for all surface water. The island's rivers and streams are generally short, with the longest extending no more than 10 kilometers. Notable among these are the Mwiri, Kisheke, and Mulunga rivers (each approximately 8 km), as well as the Musheke River (7.1 km). A series of rivers, including the Nyabuhyo, Mura, Kirutu, Shangano, Nyamisheke, Zira, Musheke, and Kintama, flows from north to south along the eastern side of the island. The island's lithological composition, tectonic structure, and erosional processes, particularly those influenced by Lake Kivu, have collectively shaped a fractured landscape characterized by deeply indented southern-facing bays, capes, and headlands. These bays are typically located at the mouths of alluvial valleys and function as sediment traps for sandy materials transported by streamflow, making them common locations for river mouths and sand quarrying operations.

Hydrologically, Idjwi features a complex and dense network of small watercourses. The high hills, characterized by sandy soils, are more spring-rich than the basaltic lowlands. A marked difference exists between the hydrological profiles of the eastern and western slopes: streams on the western slope tend to have more developed and regular longitudinal profiles, while those on the eastern slope are generally composed of small, irregular brooks.

== See also ==
- Idjwi
