= Iwawa =

Iwawa is an island in Rutsiro District, Western Province, Rwanda on Lake Kivu. It is the site of the Iwawa Rehabilitation and Vocational Skills and Development Center (Iwawa RC), a rehabilitation center established in 2010. The center, which is operated by the Rwanda National Rehabilitation Service, has been accused of being a prison camp for homeless people, drug users and street children. Vaccinations were carried out at the center in September 2021.

In 1995, it was the site of a Hutu militia camp which was attacked by the Rwandan Patriotic Front of Paul Kagame.
