= KivuWatt Power Station =

Power station in Rwanda

Kivuwatt Power Station
- Country: Rwanda
- Location: Kibuye
- Coordinates: 2°04′05″S 29°19′11″E
- Status: Operational
- Commission date: 17 May 2016
- Construction cost: 211 million USD
- Owner: KivuWatt Limited

Thermal power station
- Primary fuel: Methane

Power generation
- Nameplate capacity: 26 MW (35,000 hp)

KivuWatt Power Station is a floating 26 MW (35,000 hp) methane gas-fired thermal power plant in Rwanda. It burns methane extracted from the depths of Lake Kivu, a meromictic lake that can undergo dangerous limnic eruptions.

== Location ==
The power plant is located in Kibuye, Karongi District, in the Western Province of Rwanda, approximately 130 kilometres (81 mi), by road, west of Kigali, the capital and largest city in the country. It is a floating power station located on Lake Kivu.

== Overview ==
KivuWatt project extracts methane from the waters of Lake Kivu and uses the gas to generate electricity. As of 2019, the power station provided 25% of Rwanda's electricity. The generated power will be purchased by Rwanda Energy Group (REG), the Rwandan electricity utility.

The $200 million project, owned by ContourGlobal and executed in cooperation with Wärtsilä, is expected to add 26MW of generating capacity in its first phase (ongoing now) and eventually scale up to 100MW in the coming years. In a developed country, the current 25MW would provide enough energy for 45,000 people.

Phase 1 of the project, with capacity of 25MW, was expected to start commercial operation in 2012. Phase 2 of the project, with additional capacity of 75 MW, is expected to start construction six months after the commissioning of Phase 1. The project is being developed by KivuWatt Limited, a subsidiary of ContourGlobal, under a concession agreement made with the Government of Rwanda in 2009. KivuWatt Limited plans to extract some of the estimated 60 billion cubic meters of methane gas trapped under Lake Kivu and convert that gas into electricity, something that has not been done on a large commercial scale before. Construction concluded in November 2015 and the power station was under testing and calibration from November 2015 until commissioning in June 2016.

The KivuWatt power plant was inaugurated by Rwanda's president Paul Kagame on 16 May 2016.

== See also ==
- Rwanda Power Stations
- Africa Power Stations
- Rwanda Economy
- Energy in Rwanda
- Karongi District
- Western Rwanda
