= Kabaré =

- Location in Burkina Faso
- Coordinates: 12.558333°N 0.101389°E
- Country: Burkina Faso
- Region: Est Region
- Province: Gnagna Province
- Department: Bilanga Department

Population (2019)
  - Total: 2,534

Kabaré or Kibare is a town in the Bilanga Department of Gnagna Province in eastern Burkina Faso.

Population
Year	Pop.	±%
2006	1,846	—
2019	2,534	+37.3%
