= Symbion Power =

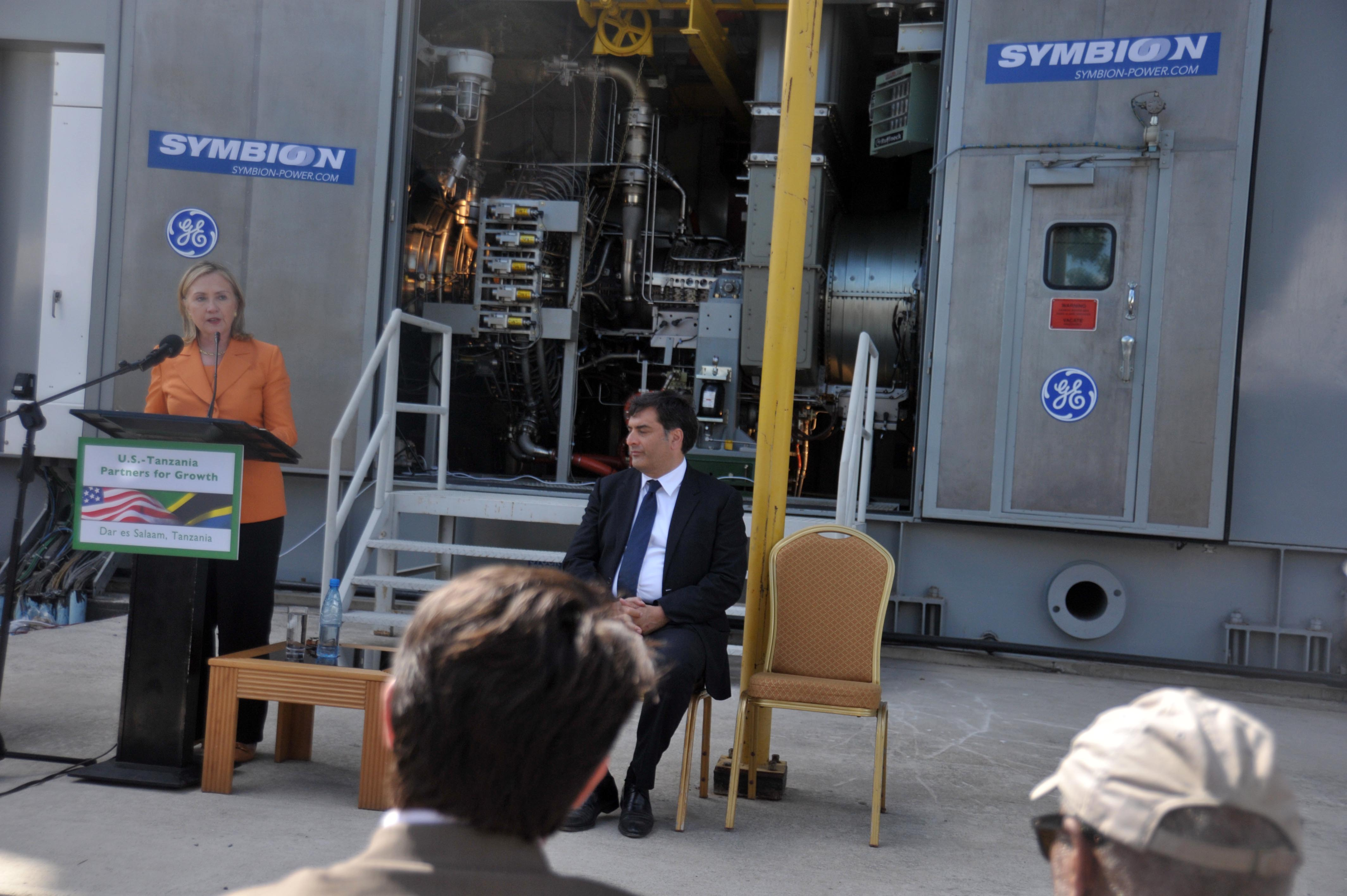
Hillary Clinton delivers remarks at the Symbion Power Plant in Dar es Salaam, Tanzania.

Symbion Power is a US power engineering and construction firm that has operations in Iraq and Afghanistan. Since 2005 Symbion has been responsible for the construction of transmission and distribution facilities throughout Iraq. In 2005/2006 the company was awarded $250 million of US funded competitively bid reconstruction work. Symbion is rated in the top 10 US firms using IRRF funds.

Symbion Power LLC engages in the design, engineering, procurement, and construction of electrical infrastructure projects. Its projects include transmission or transmission and distribution lines, air and gas insulated substations, and power plants in the United States, Africa, the Middle East, Europe, Asia, and Australia.

The company also owns and operated a power plant in Tanzania for the generation of electricity. In 2016, it stopped operations and in 2020 it was sentenced to pay employees who had missed salaries for 30 months, or have their property auctioned.

In addition, it constructs and operates training schools to help develop a skilled local workforce capable of constructing and installing an electrical power infrastructure in northern Iraq; Tanzania; and Kabul, Afghanistan. Symbion Power LLC was founded in 2000 and is based in Washington, District of Columbia with additional offices and subsidiaries in Delaware; Limassol, Cyprus; Cape Town, South Africa; Dubai, United Arab Emirates; Baghdad, Iraq; Erbil, Kurdistan; Port-au-Prince, Haiti; and Dar es Salaam and Morogoro, Tanzania.

In December 2015, Symbion Power signed a 25-year power purchase agreement (PPA) with Rwanda Energy Group.
