= ContourGlobal =

British power generation business

- Company type: Public limited company
- Traded as: LSE: GLO
- Industry: Power generation
- Founded: 2005; 21 years ago
- Headquarters: London, England
- Key people: Antonio Cammisecra, President and CEO
- Revenue: ▲$2,151.9 million (2021)
- Operating income: ▲$370.1 million (2021)
- Net income: ▲$79.7 million (2021)
- Parent: KKR
- Website: www.contourglobal.com

ContourGlobal Limited is a British power generation business. It was listed on the London Stock Exchange until it was acquired by KKR in December 2022.

== History ==
The company was established by Joseph Brandt with financial support from Reservoir Capital Group in 2005. In June 2015 it purchased the Vorotan Cascade in Armenia for US$180 million. ContourGlobal was the subject of an initial public offering on the London Stock Exchange which raised net proceeds of £281 million in November 2017. It then agreed to acquire Acciona's solar power plants for US$1.19 billion in February 2018.

In May 2022, the board accepted an offer from KKR which valued the company at £1.75 billion. It was announced on 16 December 2022 that the court had approved the takeover, allowing the transaction to be completed.

Following the takeover, the company appointed Antonio Cammisecra as its CEO in February 2024.

In February 2025, the company issued $1.1 billion in green bonds, 60% of the proceeds of which were allocated to renewable energy projects and power storage.

The company opened a 221MW solar power plant plant in Chile in July 2025, a 185MW solar power plant plant in Colorado, US in September 2025, and a 202MW battery energy storage system in Bulgaria in January 2026.

== Operations ==
As of October 2024, the company managed 5.6 GW of installed power generation capacity within 18 countries.
