= Idjwi =

Island in Lake Kivu belonging to the Democratic Republic of the Congo

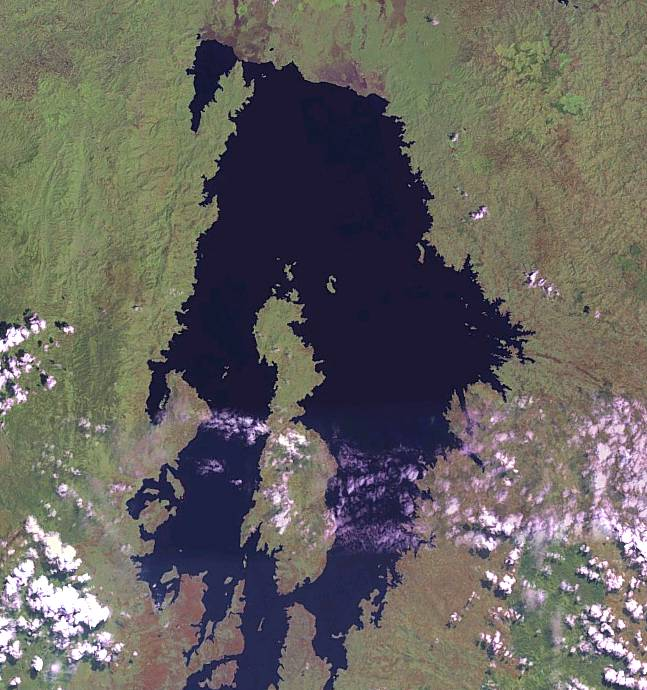
- Idjwi, in the central-southern region of Lake Kivu

- Location within Democratic Republic of the Congo Location within Rwanda Location within Africa

Geography
- Location: Lake Kivu
- Coordinates: 02°06′18″S 29°03′36″E
- Area: 340 km^{2} (130 sq mi)
- Length: 70 km (43 mi)
- Highest point: Nyamusisi

Administration
- Democratic Republic of the Congo
- Province: South Kivu
- Territory: Idjwi

Demographics
- Population: 250,000 (2009)
- Pop. density: 700/km^{2} (1800/sq mi)
- Ethnic groups: Bashi (Havu)

Idjwi, or Ijwi, is an inland island in Lake Kivu which forms part of South Kivu Province in the Democratic Republic of the Congo. At 70 km (43 mi) in length and with an area of 340 km^{2} (131 sq mi), it is the second-largest lake island in Africa and the tenth largest in the world. (Note: Ukerewe Island in neighbouring Lake Victoria is considerably bigger than Idjwi, at 530 km^{2} (205 sq mi).) Idjwi is roughly equidistant between the Congo and Rwanda, with 10 to 15 kilometres (6 to 9 mi) separating its western shore from the DRC mainland and a similar distance between its eastern shore and the coastline of Rwanda. The island's southern tip, however, lies only 1 kilometre (0.62 mi) from a promontory of the Rwandan coast. It is accessible via boat from Bukavu.

== Culture ==
Historically a clan-based Bahavu society and Bashi tribe, Idjwi island became a kingdom in the late 18th century (roughly between 1780 and 1840). Today, the island is split into two chiefdoms: Rubenga in the north, and Ntambuka in the south. Pygmies are found in both kingdoms, but moreso in Rubenga, where they do agricultural work for the chief.

Besides what is grown on the island, all goods must be ferried to Idjwi. Their primary crops are cassava, beans, coffee, and bananas. Its civic infrastructure is notably underdeveloped, and the population often suffers from infectious diseases such as malaria. However, its isolation has historically insulated it from the Kivu Conflict.

== Demographics ==
95% of residents are Bahavu, with a notable minority of pygmies and Hutus. As a result, the most spoken language on the island is Kihavu, though Swahili is also widely spoken. Much of the population is involved in mining sand, great quantities of which were once used to build the cities of Bukavu and Goma. Some residents see sand mining as a valuable potential source of income for the island.

There are 311 schools on the island, of which 203 are primary and 108 are secondary. However, they are poorly attended due to poverty and high school fees.
