= Lake Kivu =

Meromictic lake in the East African Rift valley

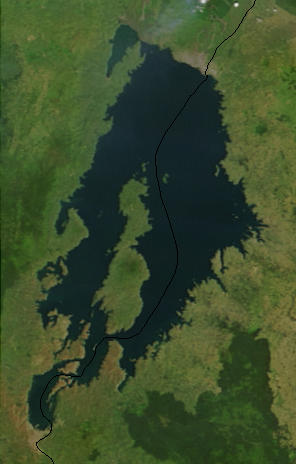
- Satellite image of Lake Kivu courtesy of NASA.

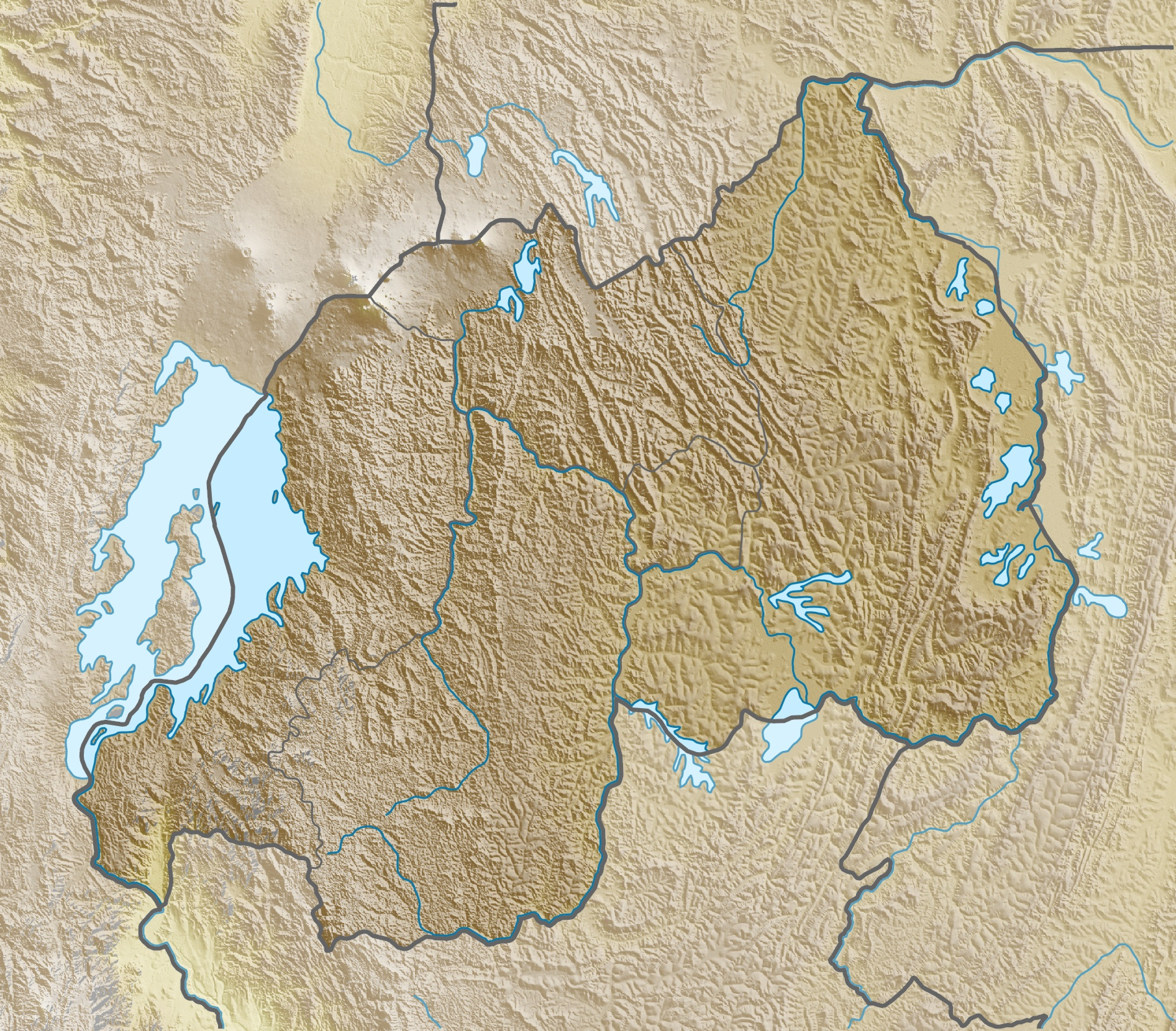
- Location within Democratic Republic of the Congo Location within Rwanda Location within Africa
- Coordinates: 2°0′S 29°0′E
- Type: Rift Valley lakes, meromictic, limnically active lake
- Primary outflows: Ruzizi River
- Catchment area: 2,700 km^{2} (1,000 sq mi)
- Basin countries: Rwanda, Democratic Republic of the Congo
- Max. length: 89 km (55 mi)
- Max. width: 48 km (30 mi)
- Surface area: 2,700 km^{2} (1,040 sq mi)
- Average depth: 240 m (787 ft)
- Max. depth: 480 m (1,575 ft)
- Water volume: 648 km^{3} (155 cu mi)
- Surface elevation: 1,460 m (4,790 ft)
- Islands: Idjwi
- Settlements: Goma, Congo; Bukavu, Congo; Kibuye, Rwanda; Cyangugu, Rwanda

Lake Kivu is one of the African Great Lakes. It lies on the border between the Democratic Republic of the Congo and Rwanda, and is in the Albertine Rift, the western branch of the East African Rift. Lake Kivu empties into the Ruzizi River, which flows southwards into Lake Tanganyika.

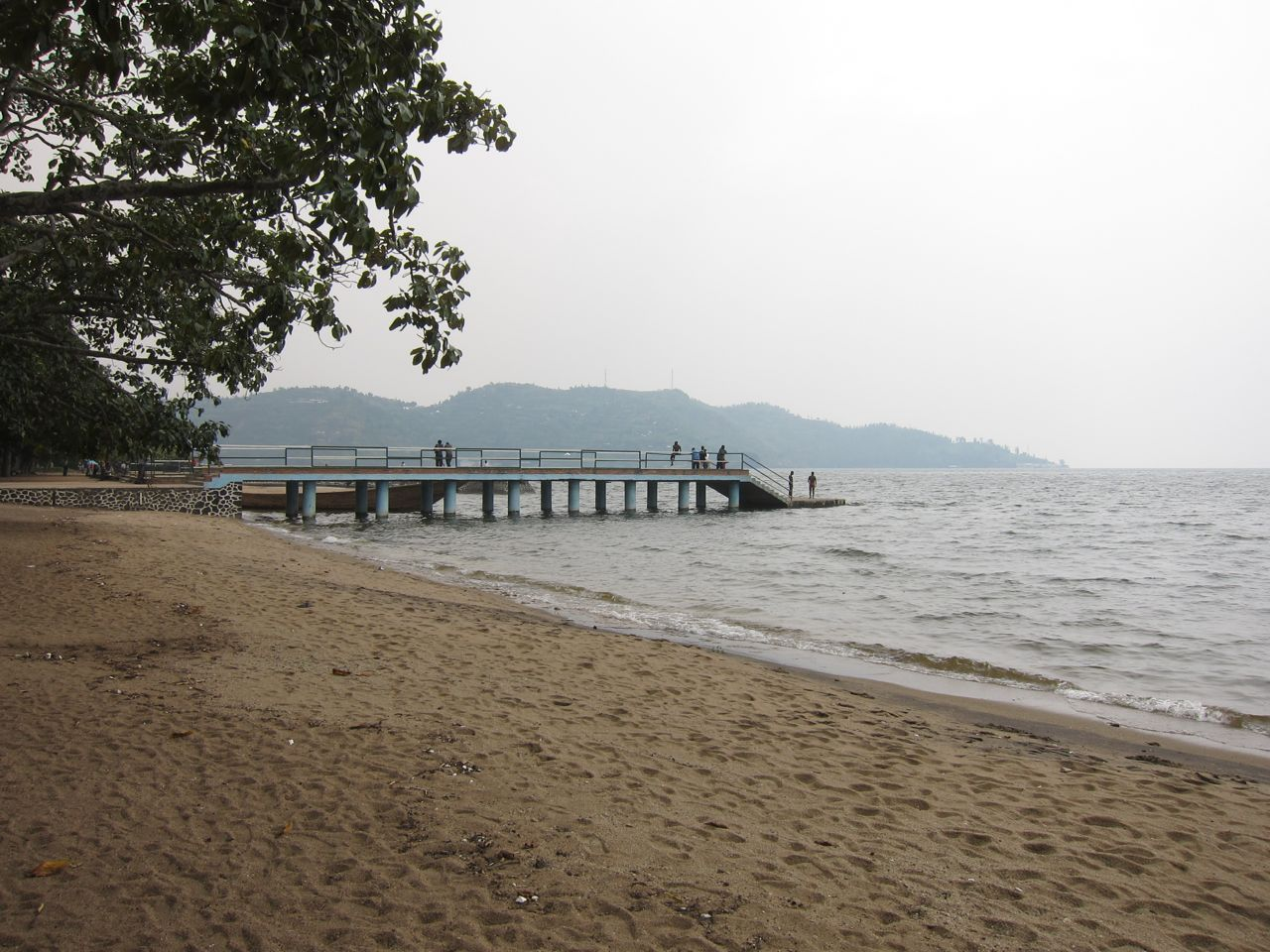
Kivu lake shoreline at Gisenyi, Rwanda

In the past, Lake Kivu drained toward the north, contributing to the White Nile. About 13,000 to 9,000 years ago, volcanic activity blocked Lake Kivu's outlet to the watershed of the Nile. The volcanism produced mountains, including the Virungas, which rose between Lake Kivu and Lake Edward, to the north. Water from Lake Kivu was then forced south down the Ruzizi. This, in turn, raised the level of Lake Tanganyika, which overflowed down the Lukuga River.

Lake Kivu is one of three lakes in the world, along with Lake Nyos and Lake Monoun, that undergo limnic eruptions (where overturn of deepwater stratified layers releases dissolved carbon dioxide (CO_{2})). The lake's bottom also contains methane (CH_{4}). If a limnic eruption occurs, the lives of the two million people living nearby would be in danger.

== Geography ==
Lake Kivu is approximately 42 km (26 mi) long and 50 km (31 mi) at its widest. Its irregular shape makes measuring its precise surface area difficult; it has been estimated to cover a total surface area of some 2,700 km^{2} (1,040 sq mi), making it Africa's eighth largest lake. The surface of the lake sits at a height of 1,460 metres (4,790 ft) above sea level. This lake has a chance of suffering a limnic eruption every 1000 years. The lake has a maximum depth of 475 m (1,558 ft) and a mean depth of 220 m (722 ft), making it the world's twentieth deepest lake by maximum depth, and the thirteenth deepest by mean depth.

The lake bed sits upon a rift valley that is slowly being pulled apart, causing volcanic activity in the area.

The world's tenth-largest island in a lake, Idjwi, lies in Lake Kivu.

=== Human geography ===
Some 1,370 square kilometres (529 sq mi) or 58 percent of the lake's waters lie within DRC borders.

Settlements on the lake's shore include Bukavu, Kabare, Kalehe, Sake and Goma in the Democratic Republic of the Congo, and Gisenyi, Kibuye, and Cyangugu in Rwanda.

In early 2025, during the M23 campaign, all settlements in the Congolese side of the lake's shores were occupied by the Rwandan military and the M23 Movement, with provincial capital Goma being captured in January and all settlements being under M23 control as of early March. In 12 March, M23 landed on Idjwi island, occupying it without resistance.

== Chemistry ==
Lake Kivu is a meromictic lake containing a freshwater surface layer that becomes more saline with depth, with a salinity approaching 6 g/kg near the bottom. Along with Cameroonian Lake Nyos and Lake Monoun, Lake Kivu is one of three that are known to undergo limnic eruptions (where overturn of deepwater stratified layers releases dissolved carbon dioxide). Around the lake, researchers found evidence of massive local extinctions about every thousand years, presumably caused by outgassing events. The trigger for lake overturns in Lake Kivu is unknown, but volcanic activity and changes in climate are both suspected. The gaseous chemical composition of exploding lakes is unique to each lake. In Lake Kivu's case, it includes methane (CH_{4}) and carbon dioxide (CO_{2}), as a result of lake water interaction with volcanic hot springs.

The amount of methane contained at the bottom of the lake is estimated to be 65 cubic kilometres (16 cu mi). If burned in a modern combined-cycle generating plant, that amount of methane would generate around 40,000 megawatts for an entire year, which is equivalent to the power output equivalent to six times that of the Grand Coulee Dam at peak springtime power. The lake also holds an estimated 256 cubic kilometres (61 cu mi) of carbon dioxide which, if released in an eruption event, could suffocate all of the inhabitants of the lakeshore. The water temperature is 24 °C (75 °F), and the pH is about 7 in the anoxic region, and around 9 in the oxygenated waters. The methane is reported to be produced by microbial reduction of the volcanic CO_{2}. A future overturn and gas release from the deep waters of Lake Kivu would result in catastrophe, dwarfing the historically documented lake overturns at the much smaller Lakes Nyos and Monoun. The lives of the approximately two million people who live in the lake basin area would be threatened.

Cores from the Bukavu Bay area of the lake reveal that the bottom has layered deposits of the rare mineral monohydrocalcite interlaid with diatoms, on top of sapropelic sediments with high pyrite content. These are found at three different intervals. The sapropelic layers are believed to be related to hydrothermal discharge and the diatoms to a bloom which reduced the carbon dioxide levels low enough to precipitate monohydrocalcite.

Scientists hypothesize that sufficient volcanic interaction with the lake's bottom water that has high gas concentrations would heat water, force the methane out of the water, spark a methane explosion, and trigger a nearly simultaneous release of carbon dioxide, though the entry of 1 million cubic meters of lava during the January 2002 eruption had no effect. The carbon dioxide would then suffocate large numbers of people in the lake basin as the gases roll off the lake surface. It is also possible that the lake could spawn lake tsunamis as gas explodes out of it.

The risk posed by Lake Kivu began to be understood during the analysis of more recent events at Lake Nyos. Lake Kivu's methane was originally thought to be merely a cheap natural resource for export, and for the generation of cheap power. Once the mechanisms that caused lake overturns began to be understood, so did awareness of the risk the lake posed to the local population.

An experimental vent pipe was installed at Lake Nyos in 2001 to remove gas from the deep water, but such a solution for the much larger Lake Kivu would be considerably more expensive. The approximately 510 million metric tons (500×10^{6} long tons) of carbon dioxide in the lake is a little under 2 percent of the amount released annually by human fossil fuel burning. Therefore, the process of releasing it could potentially have costs beyond simply building and operating the system.

This problem associated with the prevalence of methane is that of mazuku, the Swahili term "evil wind" for the outgassing of methane and carbon dioxide that kills people and animals, and can even kill vegetation when in high enough concentration.

=== Methane extraction ===
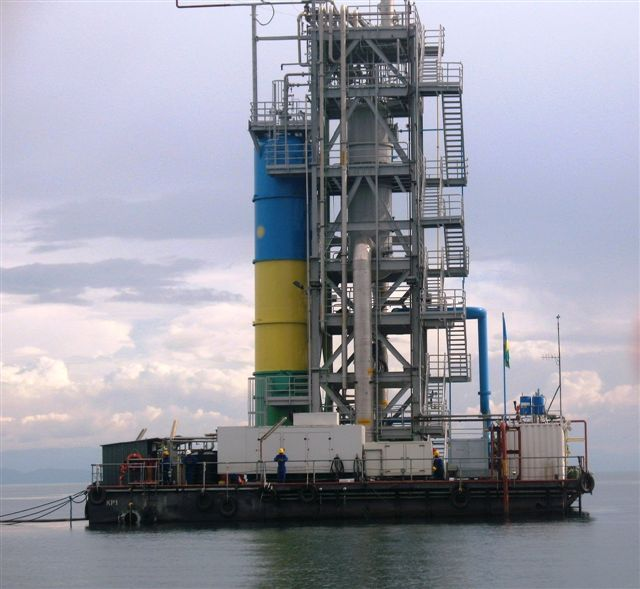
A methane extraction platform, Gisenyi, Rwanda.

Lake Kivu has recently been found to contain approximately 55 billion m^{3} (1.9 trillion cu ft) of dissolved biogas at a depth of 300 metres (1,000 ft). Until 2004, extraction of the gas was done on a small scale, with the extracted gas being used to run boilers at the Bralirwa brewery in Gisenyi. As far as large-scale exploitation of this resource is concerned, the Rwandan government has negotiated with a number of parties to extract methane from the lake.

In 2011 ContourGlobal, a UK-based energy company focused on emerging markets, secured project financing to initiate a large-scale methane extraction project. The project is run through a local Rwandan entity called KivuWatt, using an offshore barge platform to extract, separate, and clean the gasses obtained from the lake bed before pumping purified methane via an underwater pipeline to onshore gas engines. Stage one of the project, powering three "gensets" along the lake shore and supplying 26 MW of electricity to the local grid, has been completed. The next phase aims to deploy nine additional gensets at 75 MW to create a total capacity of 101 MW.

In addition, Symbion Power Lake Kivu Limited was awarded a Concession and Power Producing Agreement (PPA) in 2015, to produce 50 MW of power using Lake Kivu methane. The project was expected to commence construction in 2019, with first power (Phase 1 - 14 MW) to be produced in first quarter 2020. The plant was planned to be fully operational in 2021.

Symbion Power has purchased another concession for a further 25 MW and are currently negotiating a PPA with the Rwanda Electricity Group which may see 8 MW of power dispatched to the Grid six months after the PPA has been signed. This concession is on the site of the original pilot plant known as KP1.

In addition to managing gas extraction, KivuWatt will also manage the electrical generation plants and on-sell the electrical power to the Rwandan government under the terms of a long-term Power Purchase Agreement (PPA). This allows KivuWatt to control a vertically integrated energy offering from point of extraction to point of sale into the local grid. Extraction is said to be cost-effective and relatively simple because once the gas-rich water is pumped up, the dissolved gases (primarily carbon dioxide, hydrogen sulfide and methane) begin to bubble out as the water pressure gets lower. This project is expected to increase Rwanda's energy generation capability by as much as 20 times, and will enable Rwanda to sell electricity to neighbouring African countries. The firm was awarded the 2011 Africa Power deal of the year for innovation in the financing arrangements it obtained from various sources for the KivuWatt project. The $200 million power plant was operating at 26 MW in 2016.

== Biology and fisheries ==
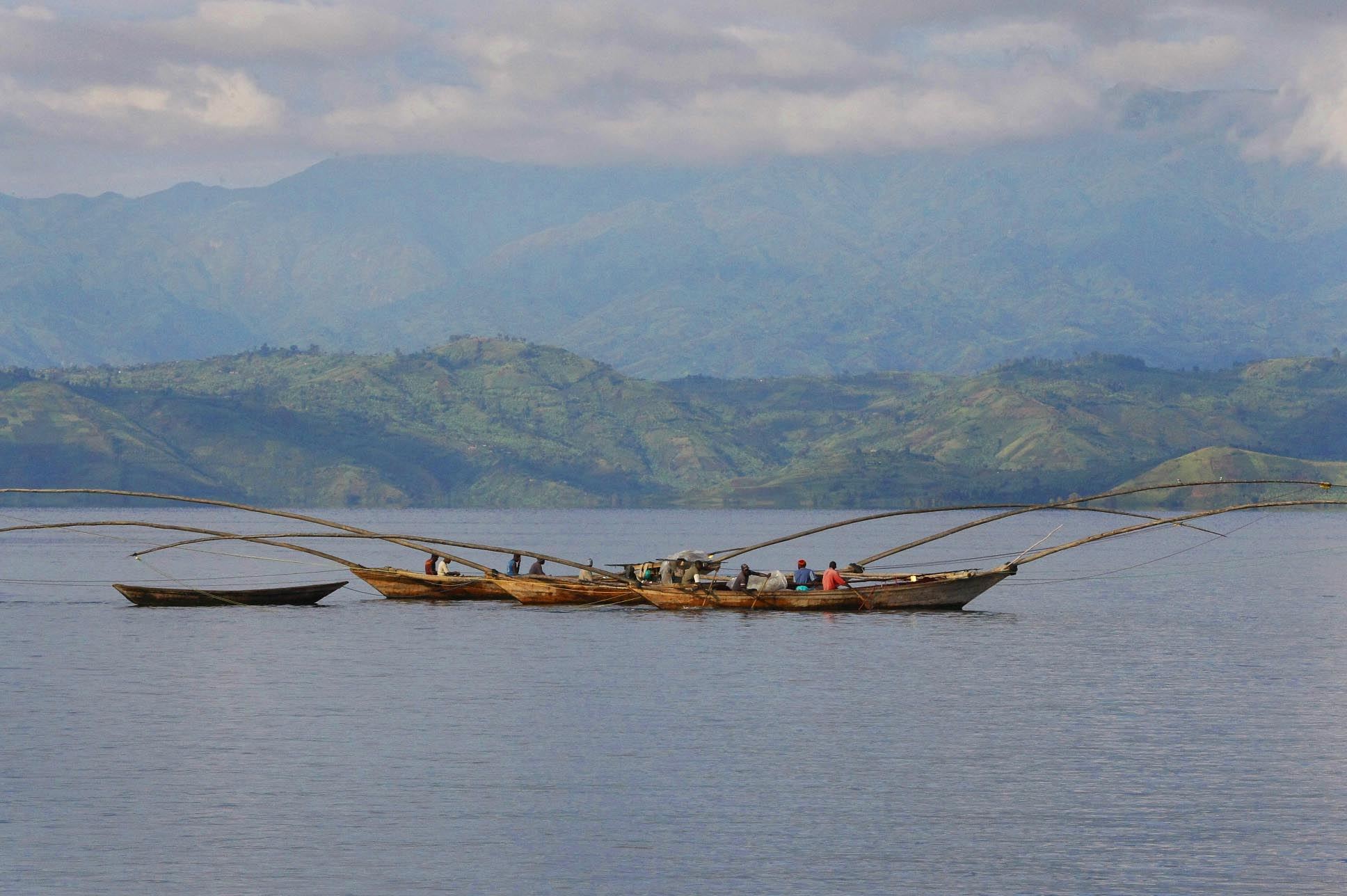
Fishing boats on Lake Kivu, 2009

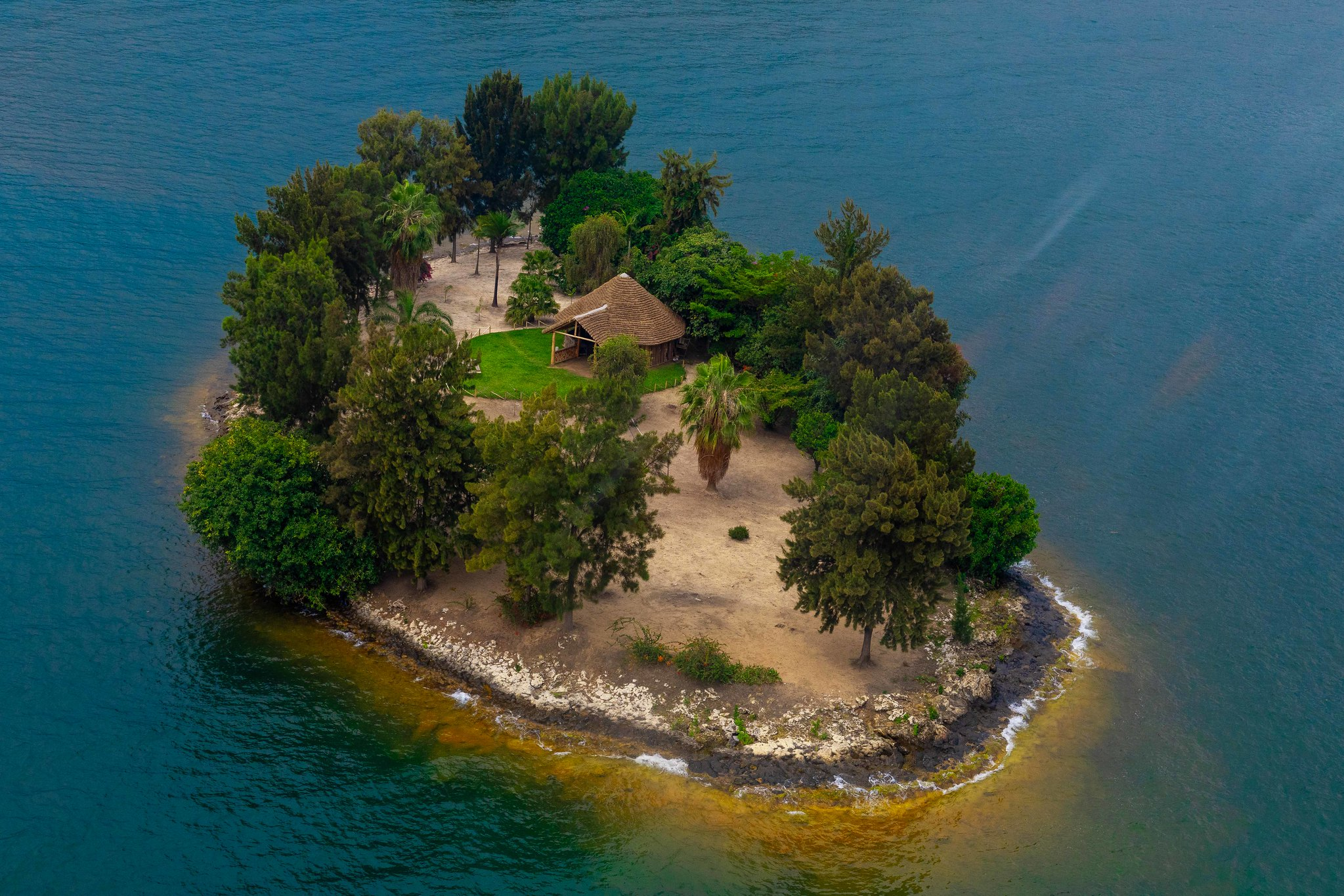
Paradis Malahide Island within the lake

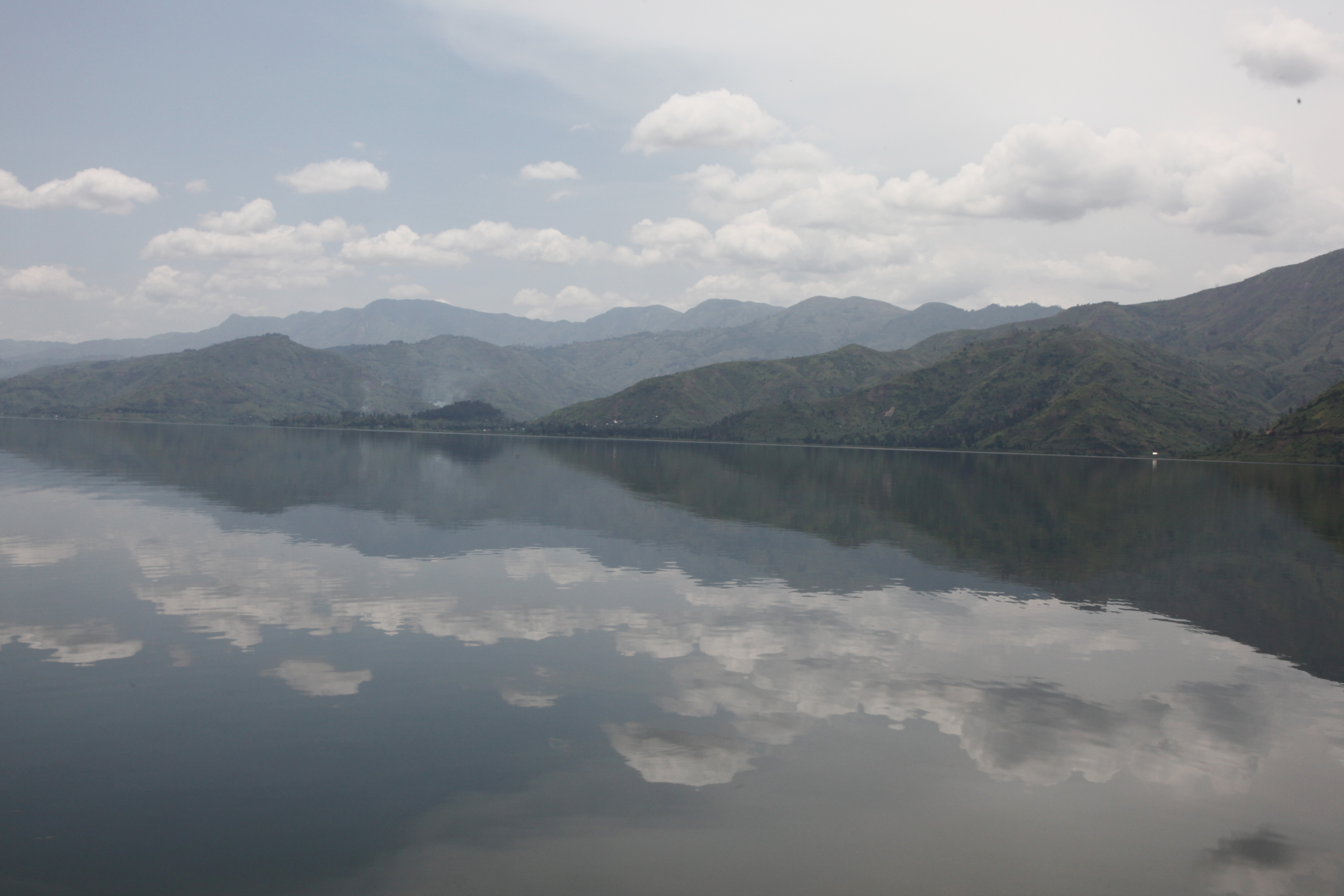
The sky reflected on Lake Kivu

The fish fauna in Lake Kivu is relatively poor with 28 described species, including four introduced species. The natives are the Lake Rukwa minnow (Raiamas moorii), four species of barb (ripon barbel, Barbus altianalis, East African red-finned barb, Enteromius apleurogramma, redspot barb, E. kerstenii and Pellegrin's barb, E. pellegrini), an Amphilius catfish, two Clarias catfish (C. liocephalus and C. gariepinus), Nile tilapia (Oreochromis niloticus) and 15 endemic Haplochromis cichlids. Another c. 20 possibly undescribed species of cichlids are known from the lake. The introduced species are three cichlids, the longfin tilapia (Oreochromis macrochir), blue-spotted tilapia (O. leucostictus) and redbreast tilapia (Coptodon rendalli), and a clupeid, the Lake Tanganyika sardine (Limnothrissa miodon) The sardine is referred to locally as 'Ndagala' or 'Isambaza'.

The exploitable stock of the Lake Tanganyika sardine was estimated at 2,000–4,000 metric tons (2,000–3,900 long tons) per year. It was introduced to Lake Kivu in late 1959 by the Belgian agronomist Alphonse Collart. An attempt to introduce the similar Lake Tanganyika sprat (Stolothrissa tanganicae) at the same time was unsuccessful.

At present, Lake Kivu is the sole natural lake in which L. miodon, a sardine originally restricted to Lake Tanganyika, has been introduced initially to fill an empty niche. Prior to the introduction, no planktivorous fish was present in the pelagic waters of Lake Kivu. In the early 1990s, the number of fishers on the lake was 6,563, of which 3,027 were associated with the pelagic fishery and 3,536 with the traditional fishery. The widespread armed conflict in the surrounding region from the mid-1990s resulted in a decline in the fisheries harvest.

Following this introduction, the sardine has gained substantial economic and nutritional importance for the lakeside human population but from an ecosystem standpoint, the introduction of planktivorous fish may result in important modifications of plankton community structure. Recent observations showed the disappearance during the last decades of a large grazer, Daphnia curvirostris, and the dominance of mesozooplankton community by three species of cyclopoid copepod: Thermocyclops consimilis, Mesocyclops aequatorialis and Tropocyclops confinis.

The first comprehensive phytoplankton survey was released in 2006. With an annual average chlorophyll in the mixed layer of 2.2 mg m^{−3} and low nutrient levels in the euphotic zone, the lake is clearly oligotrophic. Diatoms are the dominant group in the lake, particularly during the dry season episodes of deep mixing. During the rainy season, the stratified water column, with high light and lower nutrient availability, favour dominance of cyanobacteria with high numbers of phototrophic picoplankton. The actual primary production is 0.71 g C m^{−2} d^{−1} (≈ 260 g C m^{−2} a^{−1}).

A study of evolutionary genetics showed that the cichlids from lakes in northern Virunga (e.g., Edward, George, Victoria) would have evolved in a "proto-lake Kivu", much older than the intense volcanic activity (20,000-25,000 years ago) which cut the connection. The elevation of the mountains west of the lake (which is currently the Kahuzi-Biega National Park, one of the largest reserves of eastern lowland (or Grauer's) gorillas in the world), combined with the elevation of the eastern rift (located in eastern Rwanda) would be responsible for the drainage of water from central Rwanda in the actual Lake Kivu. This concept of "proto-lake Kivu" was challenged by lack of consistent geological evidence, although the cichlid's molecular clock suggests the existence of a lake much older than the commonly cited 15,000 years.

Lake Kivu is the home of four species of freshwater crab, including two non-endemics (Potamonautes lirrangensis and P. mutandensis) and two endemics (P. bourgaultae and P. idjwiensis). Among Rift Valley lakes, Lake Tanganyika and Lake Victoria are the only other with endemic freshwater crabs.

=== Illegal fishing ===
In 2018, over 400 cases of potential illegal fishing were recorded on Lake Kivu. According to the Animal Research and Technology Transfer at the Rwanda Agricultural Board, fish production in Kivu Lake dropped from 24,199 tonnes in the 2017–2018 fishing season to 16,194 tonnes in 2019–2020, which Deputy Director Solange Uwituze attributed to fishing methods that affect fish reproduction. Between May and July 2020, Rwanda Police Marine Unit operations reported 27 cases including 10 arrested poachers for illegal fishing on the lake.

== Islands ==
- Idjwi (part of Idjwi Territory, South Kivu Province)
- Nyamunini (also known as Napoleon Island)
- Amahoro
- Iwawa

== Gallery ==
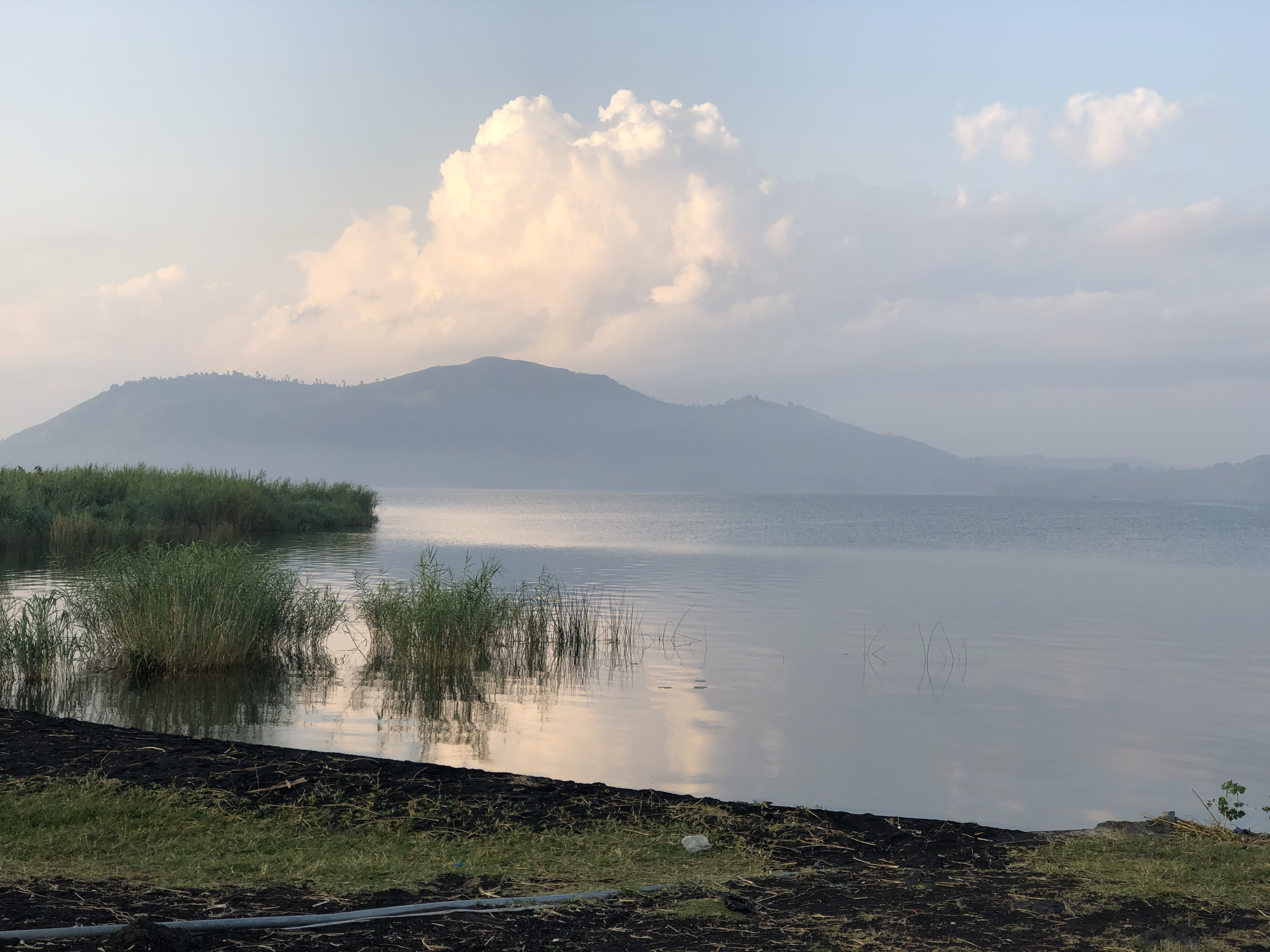
Lake Kivu from Sake, Goma, D R Congo

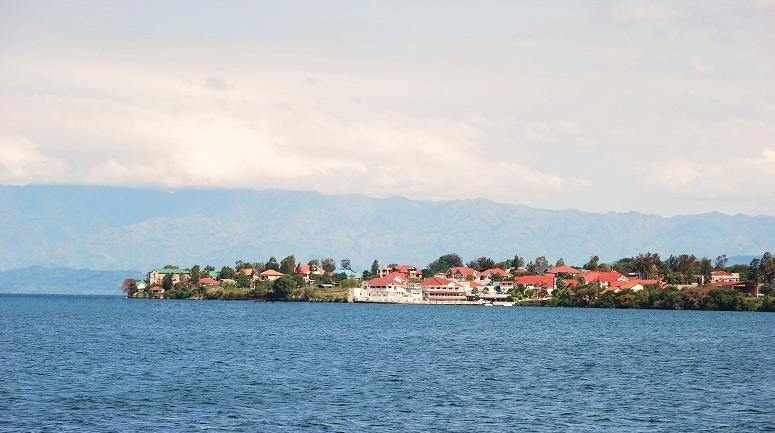
Lake Kivu with Goma in the background, Congo

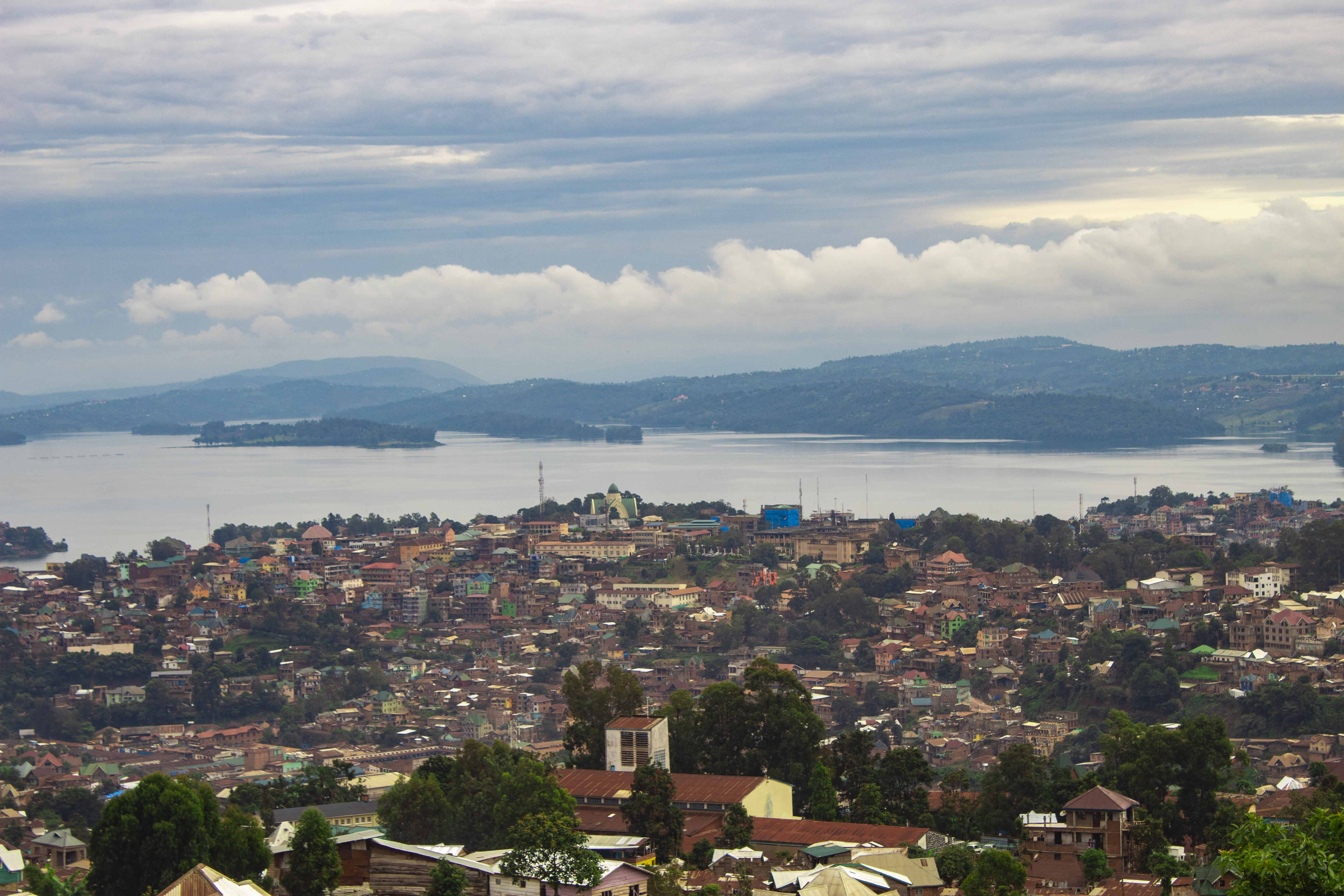
Lake Kivu separating Bukavu (in the foreground) and Cyangugu (in the background) as seen from Tumbimbi.

== See also ==
- Gasmeth Energy Gas Works
- Limnic eruption
- Mazuku
- Meromictic lake
- Nyamyumba Hot Springs
