= Rubengera Genocide Memorial =

Memorial of the 1994 Genocide against the Tutsi in Rwanda

- View of the Rubengera Genocide Memorial, August 2026
- Interactive map of Rubengera Genocide Memorial
- Location: Rubengera, Karongi District, Western Province, Rwanda
- Coordinates: 2°03′08″S 29°24′54″E
- Type: Genocide memorial
- Dedicated to: 1994 genocide against the Tutsi
- Use: Ibuka

The Rubengera Genocide Memorial is a memorial site located in Rubengera, Karongi District, Western Province, Rwanda. It commemorates the victims of the 1994 genocide against the Tutsi killed in the former Mabanza commune, part of which corresponds to the present-day Rubengera sector.

The memorial contains the remains of 3,439 victims of the genocide against the Tutsi.

== Location ==

Some memorials of the 1994 Genocide against the Tutsi in Rwanda.

=== Context ===
The Rubengera Genocide Memorial commemorates Tutsi killed in the former Mabanza commune, in the former Kibuye Prefecture. The commemoration held on 24 April 2025 at Rubengera honoured victims killed in the former commune, part of which corresponds to the present-day Rubengera sector.

The memorial is one of several genocide memorial sites in Karongi District, alongside Bisesero, Gatwaro, Mubuga, Nyamishaba and other local memorial sites.

=== Setting ===
Plaque marking the location of the Rubengera Genocide Memorial; August 2026.

The memorial is located in the Rubengera sector of Karongi District, in Western Province. The area formed part of the former Mabanza commune in Kibuye Prefecture during the genocide. The memorial serves as a burial and remembrance site for victims killed in Mabanza. Karongi District records 3,439 victims as being buried at the site.

== History ==
The genocide in the former Mabanza commune has been examined by Philip Verwimp in research on Kibuye Prefecture. Using an Ibuka register covering nearly 59,050 victims across the prefecture, Philip Verwimp recorded 9,257 Tutsi killed in Mabanza commune, representing approximately 86% of its Tutsi population, and 1,477 survivors..

Philip Verwimp's analysis also found differences in survival rates between sectors of Mabanza. Tutsi who did not gather at the football stadium in Kibuye and those who reached mountainous areas where they attempted to defend themselves had higher chances of survival than people gathered at major assembly sites. Rubengera was among the sectors included in the statistical analysis of survival in the former Mabanza commune.

Communes of Rwanda in 1994.

Documents associated with Ignace Bagilishema, the former bourgmestre of Mabanza commune, also record the activity of Interahamwe groups in Rubengera. In a letter dated 24 June 1994, Ignace Bagilishema wrote that Interahamwe from Gisenyi who had reinforced attacks against Tutsi at Bisesero between 19 and 22 June 1994 were to stop at Rubengera centre in Mabanza to launch an attack. The letter also describes a roadblock outside the commune office and gunfire that caused inhabitants of Rubengera to flee their homes.

After the genocide, Rubengera became a burial and commemoration site for victims killed in the former Mabanza commune. Commemorations organised as part of Kwibuka include memorial walks, periods of remembrance at the burial site and the laying of wreaths.

A new memorial was developed at Rubengera in the early 2010s. In 2012, World Vision provided 30 million Rwandan francs for the construction of a new mass grave for victims of the genocide against the Tutsi. The project followed the deterioration of the previous memorial, which had been damaged by rainwater and the ageing of its structure. The foundation stone was laid on 14 June 2012 near the former mass grave.

== Features ==
View of the Rubengera Genocide Memorial.

The Rubengera Genocide Memorial is a collective burial and remembrance site for Tutsi killed in the former Mabanza commune. The memorial contains the remains of 3,439 victims.

The memorial is used for annual remembrance ceremonies. During the 31st commemoration held at Rubengera on 24 April 2025, participants took part in a memorial walk to the site, observed a period of remembrance for the victims buried there and laid wreaths.

During the same commemoration, local authorities and representatives of Ibuka called for continued support for genocide survivors, opposition to genocide ideology and further efforts to identify locations where the remains of victims have not yet received a formal burial.

== See also ==
=== Related articles ===
- Rwandan genocide
- List of Rwandan genocide memorials
- Bisesero Genocide Memorial Centre
- Karongi District
- Rubengera

=== Further reading ===
- Verwimp, Philip (March 2004). "Death and survival during the 1994 genocide in Rwanda" (PDF). Population Studies. 58 (2): 233–245.

=== External links ===
- "Hibutswe Abatutsi biciwe ahahoze ari Komini Mabanza, Rubengera y'ubu". Karongi District (in Kinyarwanda). 24 April 2025.
