= Clarisse Imaniriho =

Rwandan politician

Member of the Chamber of Deputies
- Incumbent
- Assumed office 2018
- Constituency: Youth representative

Personal details
- Born: 1995 (age 30–31) Karongi District, Rwanda
- Education: University of Rwanda

Imaniriho Clarisse (born 1995) is a Rwandan politician who has served as a member of the Chamber of Deputies since 2018. At age 23 was elected as one of the youth representatives in the 2018 Rwandan parliamentary election and was the youngest member of the Rwandan Parliament at the time of her election.

== Early life and education ==
Clarisse was born in 1995 in Bwishyura, Karongi District. She was the last born of four children who were raised by their widowed (single) mother. She received a bachelor's degree from the University of Rwanda in 2017.

== Political career ==
In September 2018, Imaniriho was elected to one of the two seats in the Chamber of Deputies reserved for youth representatives. The representatives were chosen through an electoral college composed of members of the National Youth Council from across Rwanda.

In November 2018, she was elected to the auditors committee of the Rwanda Women Parliamentarians Forum (FFRP), an organization that brings together women members of parliament from different political parties.

In a 2019 feature on Rwanda published during the 25th anniversary of the genocide against the Tutsi, Der Spiegel interviewed Imaniriho and described her as the country's youngest parliamentarian.
