= Amelia Barbieri =

Italian midwife, nurse, lay missionary

- Barbieri (l) with Maria Pia Fanfani (r) holding one of the rescued orphans upon arrival in Italy
- Born: 15 November 1918; San Vito di Leguzzano, Italy
- Died: 20 August 2016 (aged 97); Schio, Italy
- Other names: Nonna Amelia
- Occupations: Nurse, midwife, orphanage matron

Amelia Barbieri (15 November 1918 – 20 August 2016) was an Italian nurse, midwife, and lay missionary. After a career in Italy, in 1983 rather than retire she moved to Rwanda. She worked as a nurse in Rugabano and then founded a maternity center in Shyorongi. Later she moved to Byumba where she cared for abandoned children. In 1992, she founded an orphanage in the village of Muhura, in the Gatsibo District of the Eastern Province. The orphans were endangered during the Rwandan genocide but Barbieri refused to leave without them. With help from humanitarian Maria Pia Fanfani they were temporarily moved to Uganda and then relocated to Verona, Italy. Her dedication to the children's welfare was honored by President Oscar Luigi Scalfaro, who conferred upon her the distinction Commendatore al Merito della Repubblica (Commander of Merit of the Republic) in 1995. When the genocide ended Barbieri returned to Rwanda and ran the orphanage until 2008. Because of failing health, she brought in assistants and worked with them until 2012 when her condition forced her to return to Italy.

Barbieri died in 2016. The orphanage she established, first known as the St. Joseph Orphanage and then as Casa San Giuseppe (Saint Joseph's Home), was run by Rwandan and Congolese staff affiliated with the Angelic Sisters of Saint Paul after Barbieri returned to Italy. Following several years of struggling for adequate financing, changes in the adoption laws in Rwanda, and finally a shut-down of all orphanages in the country, in 2018 Sister Odille, the matron, converted the home into the Nonna Amelia Nursery and Primary School. In 2022, it was ranked among the best schools in the Gatsibo District and had an enrollment of 300 students.

== Early life, family, and career ==
Amelia Barbieri was born on 15 November 1918 in San Vito di Leguzzano, in the Veneto region of northern Italy. She had two children, Giorgio and Laura Lunardon, prior to being widowed. Trained as a midwife, she had a nursing career in the Vicenza Province, retiring in 1983. After retirement, Barbieri did not want to be idle and when she saw an article in the magazine Famiglia Cristiana (The Christian Family) that a midwife was needed in Rwanda, she decided to apply.

== Rwanda (1983–2012) ==
Barbieri's first posting in 1983 was in Rugabano, in the Karongi District of western Rwanda, where she worked as a nurse. She then founded a maternity center in Shyorongi in the Rulindo District in the Northern Province, about 5.6 miles (9.0 km) from the Rwandan capital of Kigali. After training African staff to take over the center, a few years later, she moved to Byumba, where she worked as a lay missionary and cared for abandoned children. Byumba is the capital of Gicumbi District, neighbors the border with Uganda, and lies approximately 37 miles (60 km) from Kigali. Since the late 1950s, the city had been the site of massacres in the ethnic conflicts between the Hutu and Tutsi peoples. Many Rwandan Tutsis had grown up in refugee camps in Uganda and dreamed of returning to Rwanda, although return was prohibited during the Habyarimana presidency (1973–1994). In 1986, these refugees formed the Rwandan Patriotic Front and in 1990 demanded the right to resettle in Rwanda. They formed a militia and began marching toward Kigali in October, but were halted by French and Belgian forces, beginning the Rwandan Civil War. By the end of the year, most of the territory around Byumba was controlled by the Rwandan Patriotic Front, which had become the center for refuge efforts with people being brought there from other parts of the country for medical treatment. Writer Fergal Keane in describing the area said that during the genocide, Rwanda became "a country of corpses and orphans" and policy expert Fatuma Ndangiza stated that the streets were overrun with homeless children.

Encouraged by a local missionary, in 1992, Barbieri founded an orphanage and home for single mothers, which she called San Giuseppe (St. Joseph's) in the village of Muhura, in the Gatsibo District in the Eastern Province and about 75 miles (121 km) northeast of Kigali. By 1994, her orphanage was surrounded by militia groups. Initially she vowed to remain, but food supplies began to run short and she was fearful that the orphans would be massacred during the genocide, if she left. She made contact with Maria Pia Fanfani for help. Fanfani was a humanitarian who had previously been president of the Women's Committee of the Italian Red Cross, a vice president of the International Federation of Red Cross and Red Crescent Societies and was the founder and administrator of the Sempre Insieme per la Pace (Always Together For Peace) organization. Because official channels had failed and communication was difficult, Fanfani secured permits and arranged escorts directly from the Rwandan Patriotic Front militia. She worked with the Opera Cardinal Ferrari and the Compagnia di San Paolo (Company of Saint Paul), both Milan-based humanitarian NGOs, to accomplish the children's evacuation and resettlement. "Operation Stork" succeeded in freeing all fifty-two of the orphans and their caretakers from St. Joseph's Home, using a privately arranged Boeing plane.

Barbieri gave an account of the journey to Italian newspapers. She said that because the main roads were mined, their convoy of children in three rented minivans and a four-wheel drive she drove herself, followed a ten-hour circuitous route through the mountains and forests, following river beds. They did not stop for rest or sustenance and often heard shooting, after they left Gahini. Although the rebels wanted them to take twenty injured children from the Gahini hospital, most of them had injuries that were too serious for them to survive the flight. Three of the children from the hospital were taken with Barbieri's orphans to Kampala airport. Fanfani arranged for a plane to fly into the country bringing relief supplies including clothing, medicines and medical supplies, solar-powered water-filtration systems and agricultural equipment. On the return flight, the plane airlifted Barbieri and all of the children to Italy. They landed in Bergamo at the end of April and were then taken to U.O.S. Cerris, a care center in Verona, which had previously been an orphanage. Most of the children had dysentery and other medical problems like bronchopneumonia. They were fed, clothed, and treated while the staff sorted through adoption requests. Barbieri was honored as a Commendatore al Merito della Repubblica (Commander of Merit of the Republic) in May 1994 by Italian President Oscar Luigi Scalfaro.

After the civil war ended, in 1995 the Rwandan government demanded that Barbieri and the orphans return to Muhura, which they did. In 2008, she turned the day-to-day management of the home over to Congolese nuns and focused on fundraising through the Associazione Amici di Nonna Amelia (Friends of Grandma Amelia Association). Although mentally sound, physical ailments forced Barbieri to return to San Vito di Leguzzano in 2012, where she lived until 2015, when she entered the Istituto Casa Panciera (Panciera Home Institute) in Schio.

== Death and legacy ==
Barbieri died on 20 August 2016 in Schio, and was buried in the family plot at the San Vito di Leguzzano Cemetery. At the time of her death, she was remembered for her work as a lay missionary in Rwanda. The St. Joseph Orphanage was renamed Casa San Giuseppe (Saint Joseph's Home) by Rwandan and Congolese staff affiliated with the Angelic Sisters of Saint Paul. The Rwandan government suspended foreign adoptions in 2010, banned foreigners inside the country from adopting children in 2016, and began to phase out orphanages in 2018. The policies made the situation for orphans more difficult. The sisters running Saint Joseph's sought foreign sponsorship for their charges from the Movimento per la Lotta contro la Fame nel Mondo (Movement to Fight World Hunger), which in 2014 helped establish a fish farm to provide food for the children and income from the sale of excess fish. In 2018, when the government ordered orphanages to close, the matron, Sister Odille, converted the home into the Nonna Amelia Nursery and Primary School. In 2022, it was ranked among the best schools in the Gatsibo District.
