= Birambo =

Popular Place in Rwanda

Coordinates: 2°08′40″S 29°31′30″E

Birambo is a town in Karongi District, Western Province, Rwanda. Located in Gashali sector nearest Rugabano sector, the population in 2012 was over 5,000. This also contains Saint Joseph Birambo popular school in Western Province. It also contains a school called Esa Urumuri and other infrastructures.

== See also ==
- Gasenyi
