= Kiziba refugee camp =

Coordinates: 2.133°S 29.351°E

- Refugee camp
- Interactive map of Kiziba refugee camp
- Country: Rwanda
- Province: Western Province
- District: Karongi District
- Sector: Rwankuba Sector
- Established: December 1996

Area
  - Total: 44 ha (110 acres)

Population
  - Estimate: 14,000

Kiziba refugee camp is the oldest refugee camp in Rwanda. It was established in 1996 and is located in the Rwankuba Sector of Karongi District in the Western Province of Rwanda. The more than 14,000 refugees living there are predominantly Tutsi who originate from North Kivu Province in the Democratic Republic of the Congo. Many of the children and young adults in the refugee camp, however, were born there and have grown up in the camp. The Ministry in Charge of Emergency Management (MINEMA) administers the camp in cooperation with the UNHCR.

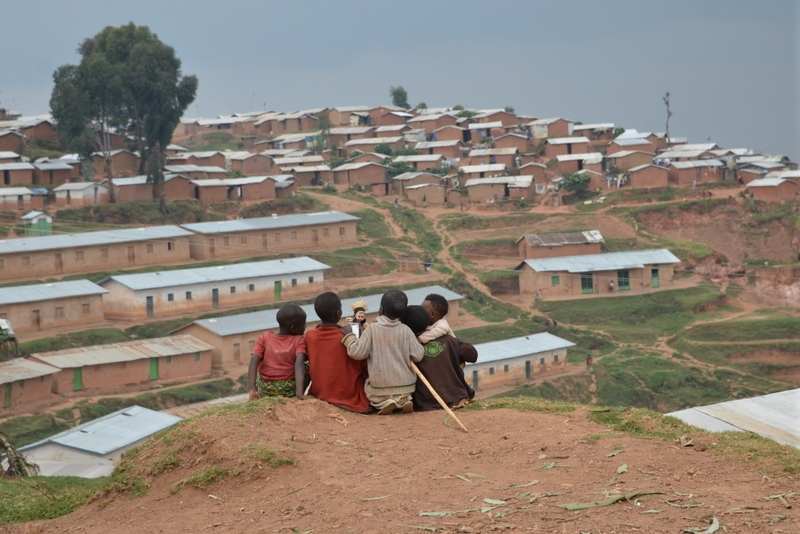
Children on a hill in the Kiziba refugee camp (2014)

Location of Kiziba refugee camp and other refugee camps in Rwanda

== Layout and administration ==
The camp originally covered an area of 28 hectares; it has since grown to around 44 hectares and is divided into ten quarters. It is administered by the Ministry in Charge of Emergency Management (MINEMA) in cooperation with the UNHCR. MINEMA is represented by a camp manager and a deputy camp manager. Staff of Rwanda’s Directorate General of Immigration and Emigration (DGIE) and the Rwanda National Police are also present in the refugee camp. Food is provided by the World Food Programme.

In addition to UNHCR, the following organizations were involved in the refugee camp as of 2022:

- Adventist Development and Relief Agency (ADRA)
- African Humanitarian Agency (AHA)
- Alight
- Caritas
- Humanity & Inclusion (HI)
- Inkomoko
- Kepler
- Plan International (PI)
- Prison Fellowship Rwanda (PFR)
- Red Cross
- World Food Programme (WFP)
- World Vision International (WVI)

Due to its location in hilly terrain, Kiziba refugee camp is vulnerable to soil erosion, surface runoff and the formation of erosion gullies. To improve the situation, UNHCR, refugees and members of the local population plant trees as part of Umuganda community work.

== History ==
=== Development of refugee numbers ===
Number of refugees in Rwanda (1965–2024) according to Our World in Data, based on UNHCR data

The camp was established in December 1996 to accommodate tens of thousands of refugees from the Democratic Republic of the Congo, both there and in Gihembe refugee camp. Most of the displaced people were Tutsi who fled violence in Masisi in North Kivu between 1995 and 1996. After some returned to the DR Congo, Kiziba refugee camp still serves today as shelter for more than 14,000 refugees. A large share of its inhabitants are now children and young adults who were born in the refugee camp, which has developed into a small town, and grew up there.

Development in figures
| Date | Number of refugees, asylum seekers and others | Source |
|---|---|---|
| April 2021 | 17,264 | |
| November 2022 | 16,277 | |
| February 2023 | 15,955 | |
| September 2023 | 16,076 | |
| December 2023 | 15,486 | |
| March 2024 | 14,911 | |

=== Financial difficulties ===
Because of a lack of funding, UNHCR and the World Food Programme reduced food assistance by 10 percent in November 2017 and by a further 25 percent in January 2018. In 2018, the Rwandan government also banned the use of firewood. Since then, UNHCR has provided monthly financial support to refugees to enable them to buy fuel for cooking. In 2023, financial assistance from UNHCR and the World Food Programme was reduced because of funding gaps. Monthly assistance for refugees in the first category fell from 8,600 RWF to 5,600 RWF; for refugees in the second category it fell from 5,600 RWF to 2,800 RWF, while support for refugees in the third category was discontinued entirely. In cooperation with organizations such as Practical Action and the Deutsche Gesellschaft für Internationale Zusammenarbeit (GIZ), contact has been made with suppliers of equipment such as sewing machines, refrigerators and solar-powered lamps in order to provide their products at subsidized prices and enable refugees to pursue income-generating activities.

=== Protests and police violence ===
On 22 February 2018, police violently dispersed a sit-in that had been taking place for three days in front of the UNHCR office in Karongi District. Hundreds to thousands of refugees had marched there on 20 February from Kiziba refugee camp, 15 kilometres away. The refugees were protesting against reduced food assistance. In attempting to break up the protest, police initially used tear gas. A few minutes later, police opened fire. According to UNHCR, eight people were killed, including five refugees. Others, including UNHCR staff and police officers, were injured. According to UNHCR, three more refugees died from gunfire in Kiziba refugee camp on the same day. The Rwandan police, however, later confirmed a total of five deaths across both locations. In the aftermath, the police contingent in the refugee camp was increased. The additional police forces arrived on 20 April. Further conflicts between refugees and police occurred in April and May, and another refugee was killed. Human rights organizations such as Amnesty International and Human Rights Watch criticized the inadequate investigation of the deaths.

== Education and health ==
Children living in the camp are integrated into the national education system in accordance with the Convention Relating to the Status of Refugees. According to UNHCR, in November 2022, 743 children from the camp attended an early childhood development facility, 3,018 attended primary school and 1,377 attended secondary school. The attendance rate was 95.5 percent. In 2015, UNHCR and the non-profit organization Kepler also established the Kepler University Campus for tertiary education; by 2022, around 300 students had graduated there.

The refugee camp has a health centre that also serves the Rwandan population in surrounding areas. It includes a maternity ward, a laboratory, treatment rooms, a pharmacy and an inpatient ward.

== Sport ==
The camp takes part in the annual Refugee Inter-camp Games. At these games, refugees from the various refugee camps in Rwanda compete against one another in sports such as basketball and football.
