= Consolee Nishimwe =

Rwandan author

Consolee Nishimwe (born 11 September 1979) is a Rwandan author, a motivational speaker, and a survivor of the 1994 Rwandan genocide.

== Background ==
Nishimwe was born on 11 September 1979 in Rubengera, Kibuye, Rwanda. Her mother, Marie-Jeanne Mukamwiza, and father, Andre Ngoga were both primary school teachers. They met in 1972 and married in August 1977. Nishimwe is the eldest of five children. She speaks English and Kinyarwanda.

== Rwandan genocide ==
Nishimwe was 14 when the Rwandan genocide began in April 1994. The family took refuge in a Muslim area for protection but her father and aunt were killed on 15 April 1994. A week later, her three brothers, 16-month-old Bon-Fils Abimana, 7-year-old Pascal Muvara, and 9-year-old Philbert Nkusi, were murdered. Her grandparents and uncles were also killed. Nishimwe fled and hid for three months, enduring torture and other hardship, including sexual assault which resulted in HIV infection. Her mother, Marie-Jeanne, and sister, Jeanette Ingabire, survived. By the end of the genocide, 90% of the Tutsis in their town had been killed.

== Activism ==
In 2001, Nishimwe moved to the United States where she became a human rights activist and motivational speaker. In 2012, she published a memoir, Tested To The Limit: A Genocide Survivor's Story Of Pain, Resilience And Hope. In 2014, she spoke at the Yale University symposium on the 20th anniversary of the Rwandan Genocide. In 2018, she addressed the United Nations General Assembly.

== Personal life ==
Nishimwe now lives in New York City.

== Bibliography ==
- Tested To The Limit: A Genocide Survivor's Story Of Pain, Resilience And Hope (2012)
