= Maria Pia Fanfani =

Italian photographer, writer, and humanitarian worker

- Fanfani in 1981
- Born: Maria Pia Tavazzani; 29 November 1922; Pavia, Lombardy, Italy
- Died: 7 November 2019 (aged 96); Rome, Italy
- Other names: Mariapia Vecchi, Mariapia Tavazzani Fanfani
- Occupations: Photographer, writer, and humanitarian worker
- Years active: 1940–2010
- Spouse: Amintore Fanfani (m. 1975; died 1999)

Maria Pia Fanfani (formerly Mariapia Vecchi, née Maria Pia Tavazzani, 29 November 1922 – 7 November 2019) was an Italian photographer, writer, and humanitarian worker. Born in Pavia, she attended the Accademia di Belle Arti di Brera (Academy of Fine Arts in Brera) in Milan. After completing her schooling, she worked in the family textile business. During World War II, she married Giuseppe Vecchi and founded a humanitarian organization to assist in war relief. Joining the resistance, she worked as a courier, assisted Jews fleeing to Switzerland, and became active in anti-Nazi campaigns. At the end of the war, Vecchi established ties with the Italian-American community to bring humanitarian aid to war-torn Italy.

Interested in photography, Vecchi studied with Evelyn Hofer and began traveling the world to document human hardships and raise awareness of people's struggles by publishing books, including Italian Embassies of the World, Poland Second Millennium and Romania Latin World. The first two won cultural prizes from Dag Hammarskjöld and the Polish government. After the death of her first husband, she married Amintore Fanfani, a former Italian Prime Minister. Although a socialite and official hostess for her husband, she maintained her career as a photographer, writer, and humanitarian. In 1983, she became president of the Women's Committee of the Italian Red Cross, a post she held until 1994. In 1985, she also became vice president of the International Federation of Red Cross and Red Crescent Societies, for a four-year term. She formed Sempre Insieme per la Pace (Always Together For Peace) to expand her humanitarian efforts. With more than 200 projects over the years, she provided humanitarian aide for the benefit of victims of wars and natural disasters, covering food, medicine, agricultural equipment, water-filtration systems, and school supplies.

Fanfani was recognized by many awards for her humanitarianism, including the Meritorious Activist of Culture, Poland's highest cultural award in 1970 and 1983, and she was honored as a Grand Cross Knight of the Order of Merit of the Italian Republic in 1993. She was presented with the Premio Pellegrino di Pace (Pilgrim's Peace Prize) of the Assisi International Center for Peace in 2008; the Glory of Ossetia Medal, the highest award of the Republic of North Ossetia–Alania, in 2010; and the Umurinzi Medal, the highest honor a foreigner can receive for preserving life during the Rwandan genocide in 2010. She died in Rome in 2019.

== Early life, education, and family ==
Maria Pia Tavazzani was born on 29 November 1922 in Pavia, in the Lombardy region of Italy, to Ida and Carlo Tavazzani. Her father operated a textile factory, and her mother raised their seven children. Tavazzani was their next to the last child and attended school at the Istituto Antonio Bordoni (Antonio Bordoni Institute) in Pavia. Her parents instilled in their children a belief that affluence carried with it an obligation to respect and care for those who were less fortunate. At sixteen, she moved to Milan and entered the Accademia di Belle Arti di Brera (Academy of Fine Arts of Brera). She was very close to her brother Attilio, who convinced her to work in the family textile business when she finished school. They collaborated in building houses for the firm's workers. In 1942, Tavazzani married Giuseppe "Beppo" Vecchi, an engineer who also worked in the textile industry. That year, she founded an aid association, First Help, aimed at assisting people impacted by the war.

When Attilio became a partisan leader, Vecchi joined the resistance to the Nazis. She served as a courier and assisted Jews fleeing from Italy to Switzerland. Typically she simply pretended to be picnicking with friends in the mountains, but at times disguised herself as a nun, hiding uniforms for the refugees in her backpack to help them gain asylum. At one point, she was intercepted by German troops, but managed to escape capture. After Benito Mussolini was removed from power, she campaigned against the Nazis. Her only son, Mario, was born in 1947, and although she devoted the next decade to his care, Vecchi found time to participate in humanitarian activities. She made contact with Italian-American groups in the United States to raise awareness of the needs of post-war Italy and cultivated social contacts in Milan when playing golf, attending premieres at La Scala, or visiting villas and resorts at Crans-sur-Sierre.

== Career ==
=== Photography (1963-1989) ===
In 1963, when the Vajont Dam collapsed, Vecchi went to Longarone in the Belluno Province to take photographs and report on the disaster. Her account was published in The Irish Times, generating an influx of aid for victims of the catastrophe. Soon after, at a society event she met Life Magazine photographer Evelyn Hofer and began studying photography, which became a great passion. After traveling with Hofer to the United States, Vecchi went to Ireland, and began traveling the world taking photographs. On each trip, she visited hospitals, orphanages, and senior citizens homes to document conditions. Between 1966 and 1967, Vecchi visited the Soviet Union and encouraged the development of cultural exchange relationships as a means to bridge the misunderstandings of Cold War polarization. She published articles about the Bolshoi Theatre and arranged a photographic exhibit chronicling her Russian visits in Milan in October 1967. She began publishing a series of books on Italian embassies in 1969. Initially five books were planned to document the history of Italian diplomatic buildings in photographs and texts. Her first volume of Le ambasciate d'Italia nel mondo (Italian Embassies of the World) was awarded a Dag Hammarskjöld prize in 1969. The second volume completed the European coverage. When the eighth and last volume of the series was completed in 1989, the collection covered diplomatic offices in 113 countries. According to writer and diplomat Stefano Baldi in 2018, the series was still the "most complete collection published" on Italian diplomatic buildings.

Vecchi published Polonia 2º millenio (Poland Second Millennium) in 1970, as a photographic celebration for the two-thousandth anniversary of Poland's establishment as a Christian nation. The book featured images of people going about their daily lives and drew on Polish writers for accounts of the historical and cultural development of the country. She received the Meritorious Activist of Culture from Lucjan Motyka, the Polish Minister of Culture and Art, for the work which deepened the cultural relationship between the two countries. Vecchi met Amintore Fanfani at the book premier and they became friends after she praised his abstract paintings. Amintore had served several terms as Prime Minister of Italy and at the time was a recent widower and president of the Italian Senate. While she was working on Italian embassies abroad, Vecchi realized that few people were familiar with the foreign embassies housed in residences and palaces in Rome. In 1971, she published Ambasciate estere a Roma (Foreign Embassies in Rome), documenting twenty-two embassies. Her work focused on not only their architecture, but also on the museums they housed, which were mostly unknown to the public. Vecchi's husband, who was twelve years older than her, died that year. Her next work was published with a preface by Amintore in 1973. Romania mondo latino (Romania Latin World) focused on the Eastern Bloc, and examined not only Romanian history, but also the hardships people faced under Nicolae Ceaușescu's regime. As with her other works, Vecchi sought to present cultural heritage, such as artworks and folklore, juxtaposed with modern technology and the political environment, to create a broad understanding of the country.

=== Humanitarian and socialite (1975-2010) ===
In August 1975, Vecchi and Amintore married in a small private ceremony in Rome. His international political contacts enabled Fanfani to enlarge her network for humanitarian projects. The couple traveled to China in 1976 to investigate the situation on human rights. Extroverted and passionate about her causes, Fanfani was criticized by the press in 1978 for using her husband's status to sell her books on Italian embassies. She also received critical press when her husband returned to the post of Prime Minister in the 1980s and she relocated her humanitarian offices to Chigi Palace. She countered her critics by explaining that she paid for the renovations to the Prime Minister's residence and that as a couple, she and Amintore had always combined politics with cultural and humanitarian sensitivities. Newspapers often also reported on her attendance at various salons and activities as a socialite. While she enjoyed her high society engagements, Fanfani was equally passionate about helping others, and often hosted benefit concerts to raise funds for her relief projects. In 1978, she brought medicines, school supplies and goods to Egypt and Sudan and the following year delivered similar aid packages to Indochinese refugees living in the Cebu Islands in the Philippines. She returned to the Philippines in 1980, to help Cambodian and Vietnamese refugees on Batan Island.

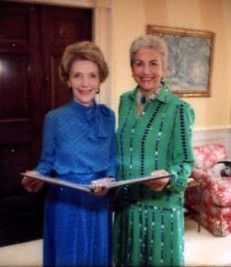
Nancy Reagan and Maria Pia Fanfani, 1981

When martial law was imposed in Poland in 1981 to end the Solidarity movement's general strike against working and social conditions, Fanfani returned to the country bringing medical supplies and food. The same year, she outfitted a hospital in Bébédjia, Chad with the supplies it needed to operate and provided food and goods to meet basic needs in the community. In 1982, she published a book Un giorno a Bebedija (One Day in Bébédjia), which reflected on the impact of world hunger and political stability. Poland awarded Fanfani a second Meritorious Activist of Culture Medal in 1983. To further her ability to help others, Fanfani became president of the Women's Committee of the Italian Red Cross in 1983 and a vice president of the International Federation of Red Cross and Red Crescent Societies in 1985, serving a four-year term. In 1985, she formed a foundation Sempre Insieme per la Pace (Always Together For Peace) to expand her humanitarian efforts, funding the organization by selling all of her personal jewelry with the exception of her wedding ring. She chartered a peace ship in conjunction with the Red Cross, which circumnavigated the African continent bringing food and medicines to Burkina Faso, Cameroon, Chad, Djibouti, Ethiopia, Guinea Bissau, Kenya, Mali, Mauritania, Mozambique, Niger, Senegal, Somalia, Sudan, Tanzania, Togo and Uganda. When the ship arrived back in Tunis in October, it was loaded with additional supplies to take medicine, clothing, and prefabricated buildings to the victims of the 1985 Mexico City earthquake.

In 1987, when debates erupted in Italy over organ donation, Fanfani supported a mass media campaign to raise awareness of its importance. Her book Hayat dalla parte della vita (Hayat: On the Side of Life), which told the story of the ship of peace to Africa, won the 1987 Premio Capri of the Centro italiano diffusion arte e cultura (Italian Center for the Diffusion of Art and Culture) in the category of social progress. That year, Amintore returned to the Prime Minister's post as temporary caretaker and her social obligations increased. She hosted a dinner for the 13th G7 summit leaders and was responsible for entertaining the attending wives, Mila Mulroney of Canada, Nancy Reagan of the United States, and Lieve Verschroeven of Belgium, taking them shopping, sightseeing, and island hopping. The following year she worked with Matilda Cuomo, first lady of New York State, hosting a forum in Rome for Italian and Italian-American women to gather and discuss women's issues. In Manhattan in December, Fanfani was one of the guests at the historic luncheon given by first lady of the United Nations Marcela Pérez de Cuéllar for US first ladies Barbara Bush and Nancy Reagan and Soviet first lady Raisa Gorbacheva. She responded to a personal request from Queen Noor of Jordan during the Gulf War to provide assistance to refugees fleeing to Jordan from Iraq and Kuwait.

Fanfani chartered a plane in 1990 bringing 14 tons of food and medical supplies to Moscow. She delivered the cargo to Gorbacheva, patroness of the Children's Hospital of Moscow. Separate convoys were arranged to deliver another 80 tons of relief supplies to children who had survived the Chernobyl disaster and victims of the Aral Sea drought and famine. She delivered a shipment of medicine, clothing, and toys to children who were hospitalized in Vilnius, Lithuania in 1991. When the Bosnian War broke out in 1992, Fanfani took educational materials and medicines to Zagreb and goods to Belgrade to assist refugees in Croatia and Serbia and flew into Sarajevo to bring additional supplies. The following year, she broke the Serbian blockade of Sarajevo and returned with clothing, medicine, and food, simultaneously sending similar aid packages and infant supplies to hospitals in Croatia and Slovenia. In 1993, she was honored as a Knight with Grand Cross of the Order of Merit of the Italian Republic. She stepped down as president of the Italian Red Cross in 1994 and that year sent a third round of relief aid to Bosnia, Croatia, Serbia, and Slovenia, before turning her attention to the Rwandan genocide. She arranged the evacuation of fifty-two orphans from the orphanage run by Amelia Barbieri in Muhura, a village northeast of Kigali to a temporary location in Uganda. When they were safely out of Rwanda, Fanfani brought in clothing, medicine and medical supplies, as well as solar systems to filter water and agricultural equipment. The plane used to deliver the relief supplies then returned to Verona with the children from Uganda. Over the next several months, she organized similar aid deliveries to refugee camps in the African Great Lakes region as well as to Kigali and Goma, Zaire.

Throughout the 1990s, Fanfani continued to monitor developments and send aid packages to the Balkans and Rwanda, particularly to assist refugees from the Kosovo War in 1998 and 1999. Amintore died in 1999, leaving her a widow for the second time. In 2002, after the fall of the Taliban regime in Afghanistan, she arranged the first western relief delivery to the country. When terrorists occupied and killed students during the Chechen separatist conflicts in Beslan, in the North Caucasus region of Russia in 2004, Fanfani was one of the first to organize relief for the area. She returned numerous times to the region and in 2010 was honored with the highest award of the Republic of North Ossetia–Alania known as the Glory of Ossetia Medal. She received the Premio Pellegrino di Pace (Pilgrim's Peace Prize) from the Assisi International Center Social Justice and Peace in 2008 and in 2010, the Umurinzi Medal, the highest honor a foreigner can receive for preserving life during the Rwandan genocide.

== Death and legacy ==
Fanfani died in Rome on 7 November 2019. She was remembered at the time for her many years of dedication to humanitarian projects and her hands-on approach to delivering aid herself rather than sending it through another party. She personally oversaw over 200 humanitarian relief projects during her lifetime. Although sometimes criticized early in her marriage to Amintore Fanfani for using his political position to further her causes, by the time of his death, she was widely reported as the "first true first lady of the Italian Republic".

== Selected works ==
- Vecchi, Mariapia (1969–1989). Le ambasciate d'Italia nel mondo [Italian Embassies of the World] (in Italian). Vol. 1–8. Milan, Italy: various. OCLC 716889604. (Volumes 1 and 2 were published as Vecchi; volumes 3-8 were published under the name Fanfani, after her remarriage.)
- Vecchi, Mariapia (1970). Polonia 2º millenio [Poland Second Millennium] (in Italian). Milan, Italy: Silvana Editoriale d'Arte. OCLC 838506862.
- Vecchi, Mariapia (1971). Ambasciate estere a Roma [Foreign Embassies in Rome] (in Italian). Milan, Italy: Edizione SISAR. OCLC 251556482.
- Vecchi, Mariapia (1973). Romania mondo latino [Romania Latin World] (in Italian). Rome, Italy: Unedi-Unione editoriale. OCLC 640039652.
- Fanfani, Mariapia (1988). Hayat: On the Side of Life (English translation ed.). New York, New York: Simon & Schuster. ISBN 978-0-671-66414-5.
- Fanfani, Mariapia (2009). Lady non stop: personaggi e incontri di una vita spesa per gli altri [Lady Non-Stop: Characters and Encounters of a Life Spent for Others] (in Italian) (1st ed.). Milan, Italy: Mondadori. ISBN 978-88-04-59517-5.
