= Kibuye, Rwanda =

- City
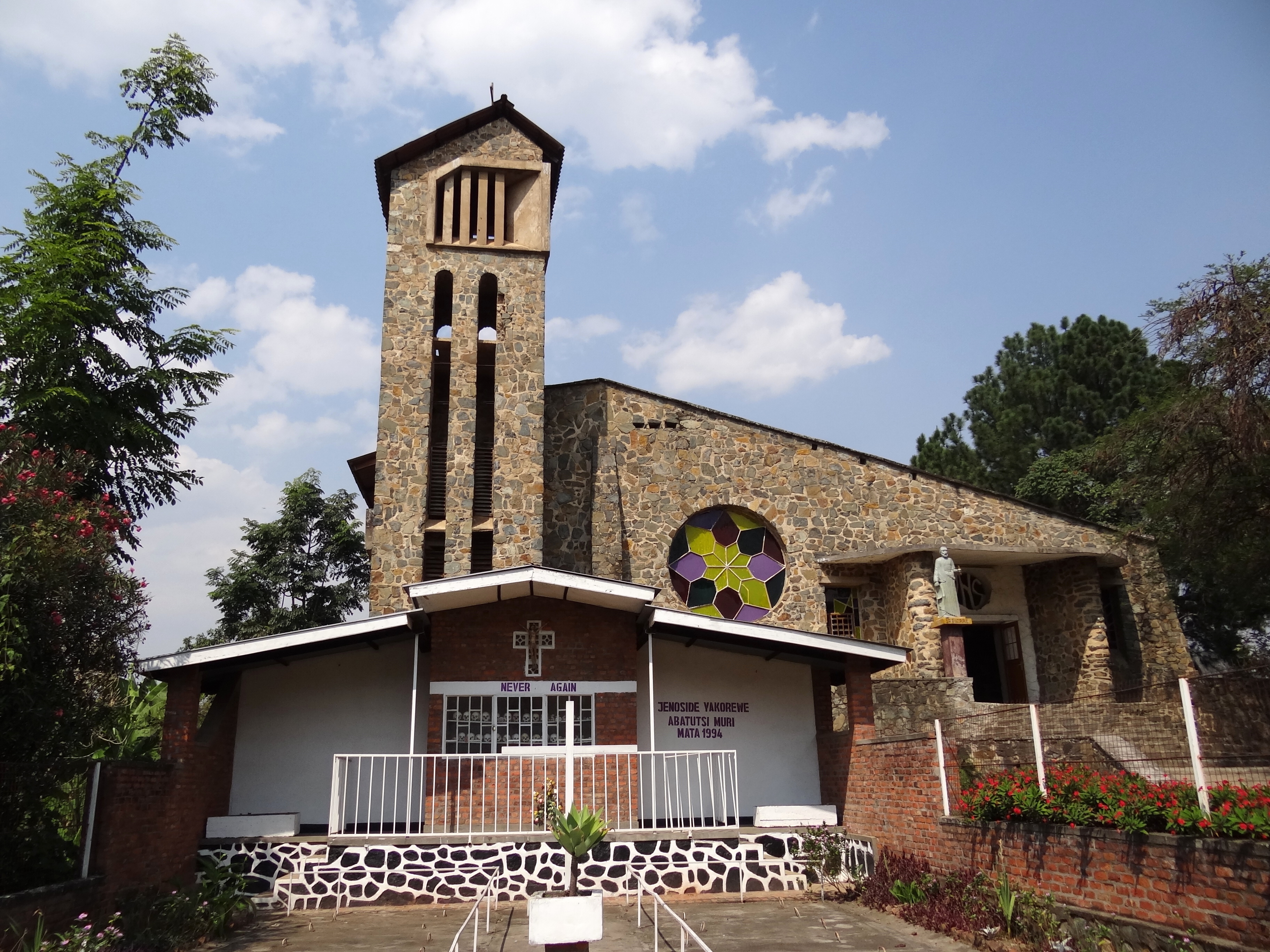
- Genocide Memorial Church with Never Again Display

- Location in Rwanda
- Coordinates: 2°03′42″S 29°20′54″E
- Country: Rwanda
- Admin. Province: Western Province
- District: Karongi
- Elevation: 1,457 m (4,780 ft)

Population (2012)
  - Total: 12,325
- Climate: Aw

Kibuye is a city in Karongi District, and the headquarters of the Western Province in Rwanda.

== Location ==
The city lies on the eastern shores of Lake Kivu, between Gisenyi and Cyangugu, approximately 135 kilometres (84 mi), by road, west of Kigali, the capital and largest city in the country. The geographical coordinates of the town are: 2°03'42.0"S, 29°20'54.0"E (Latitude:-2.061672; Longitude:29.348344).

== Overview ==
Kibuye is known as a beach resort and is within driving distance of two national parks. It is home to a genocide memorial marking the massacre of 90% of the town's Tutsi population in the Rwandan Genocide. The Ndaba Falls lie near the city.

Both Kibuye Power Plant 1 and KivuWatt Power Station lie within Kibuye.

== See also ==
- Retreat at Lake Kivu
- Gitesi
- Rubengera
- Gasenyi
- Birambo
