= Retreat at Lake Kivu =

Retreat at Lake Kivu promotional poster.

The Retreat at Lake Kivu is an international forum hosted by Never Again International for discussing issues related to genocide at Lake Kivu, Rwanda. The location of Kibuye on Lake Kivu is historically important since it many of the people killed in the Rwandan genocide were thrown into the lake and it was also prominent in the Great Lakes refugee crisis. The first conference was held from February 2 to February 8, 2006.
