= San Vito di Leguzzano =

- Comune
- Comune di San Vito di Leguzzano
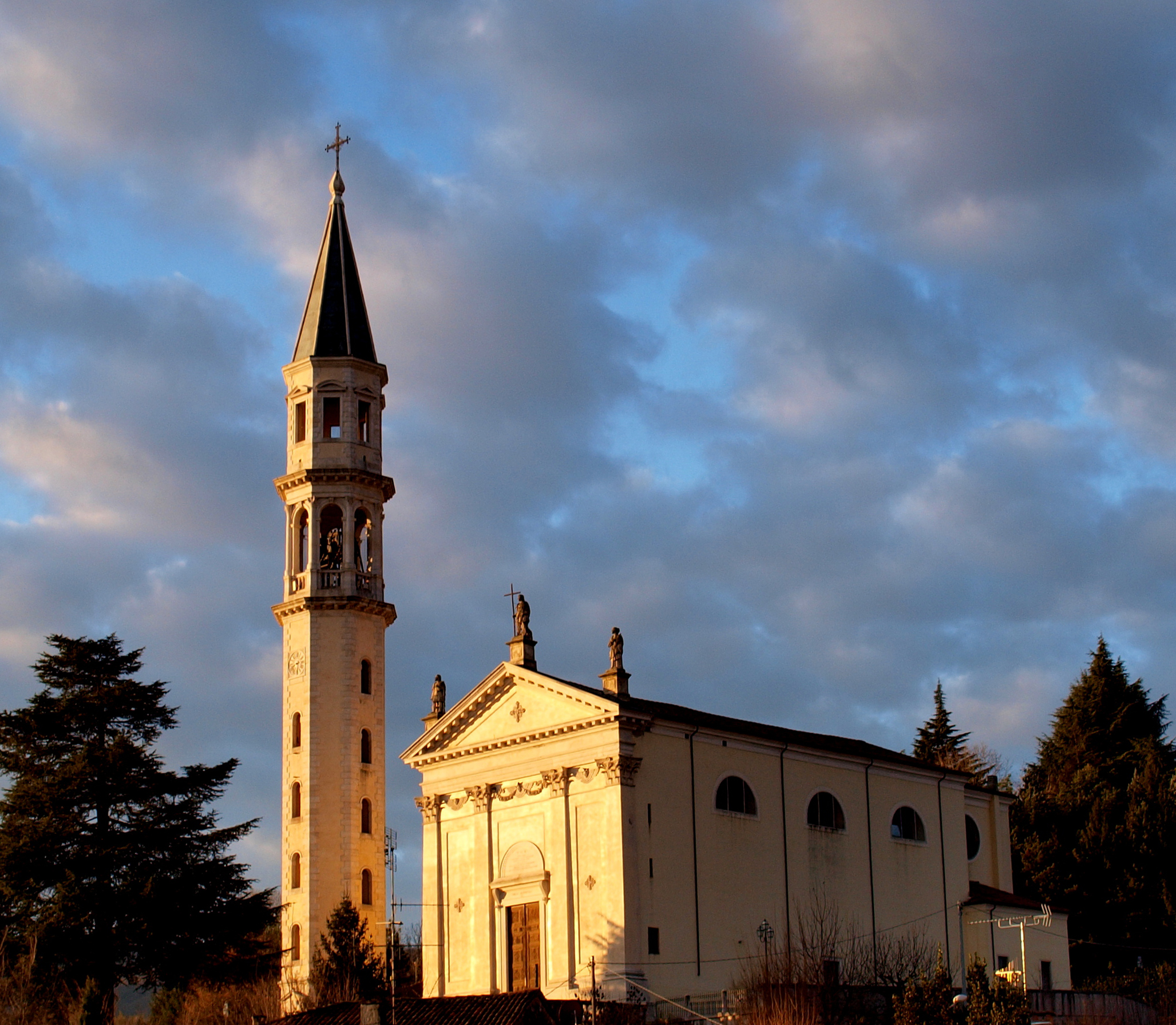
- Church of San Vito.

- Location within Italy Location within Veneto
- Coordinates: 45°41′N 11°23′E
- Country: Italy
- Region: Veneto
- Province: Vicenza (VI)
- Frazioni: Leguzzano

Government
  - Mayor: Umberto Poscoliero

Area
  - Total: 6.13 km^{2} (2.37 sq mi)
- Elevation: 158 m (518 ft)

Population (31 December 2015)
  - Total: 3,608
  - Density: 589/km^{2} (1,520/sq mi)
- Demonym: Sanvitesi
- Time zone: UTC+1 (CET)
  - Summer (DST): UTC+2 (CEST)
- Postal code: 36030
- Dialing code: 0445
- Patron saint: Sts. Vitus, Modestus and Crescentia
- Website: Official website

San Vito di Leguzzano is a town in the province of Vicenza, Veneto, Italy. It is west of SP46 road.

Sights include the parish church of Sts. Vitus, Modestus and Crescentia and the 16th century church of St. Valentino.

== Notable people ==
- Amelia Barbieri (1918–2016), midwife and lay missionary, who rescued Rwandan orphans during the genocide.
