= Bwishyura =

Sector in Karongi District, Western Province, Rwanda

- Town and sector
- Interactive map of Bwishyura
- Country: Rwanda
- Province: Western Province
- District: Karongi District

Area
  - Town and sector: 46.21 km^{2} (17.84 sq mi)

Population (2022 census)
  - Town and sector: 40,720
  - Density: 881.2/km^{2} (2,282/sq mi)
  - Urban: 18,530

Bwishyura is a town and sector in Karongi District, Western Province in Rwanda, with a population of 40,720 (2022 census). The town, also known as Kibuye, is the capital of Western Province.
