= Mutuntu =

Sector in Western Rwanda

Mutuntu Sector Umurenge wa Mutuntu
- Sector
- Mutuntu
- Interactive map of Mutuntu Sector
- Coordinates: 2°14′S 29°25′E

Government
  - Type: Official Office of Government

Population
  - Urban: Gasenyi and Mukungu

Mutuntu is a sector (Umurenge) in Karongi District, Western Province, Rwanda. The population in 2012 was 23,084. This also contain Gasenyi popular place in Karongi District. Nearest Karongi Tea Factory and Musango Hospital. It also contains a town called Gasenyi.
