= Ruganda =

- Location in Rwanda
- Coordinates: 2°13′05″S 29°29′47″E
- Country: Rwanda
- Admin. Province: Western Province
- District: Karongi

Population (2012)
  - Total: 17,508
- Climate: Aw

Ruganda is a sector in Karongi District, Western Province, Rwanda. The population in 2012 was 17,508.
