= Ibuka (organisation) =

Umbrela organization

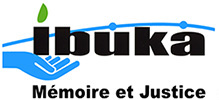
Logo of the non-governmental organisation, Ibuka

Ibuka is an umbrella organisation that connects the groups that aid survivors of the 1994 Rwandan genocide, it was established in December 1995. It also participates in the international arena through events like the 2010 Geneva Summit for Human Rights and Democracy. In 2014, the organisation released a report stating that at least 168 genocide survivors were killed between 2002 and 2014.

"Ibuka" is a Kinyarwanda word for "remember".
