= Gitesi =

Sector in Rwanda

Gitesi is a sector in Karongi district, Western Province, Rwanda. The population in 2012 was 24,859. Gitesi contains many plantations of coffee and tea and also contains Gasenyi in the Rwariro cell where the Karongi tea factory is located.

Gitesi sector in Karongi district
