= Rubengera =

- Town and sector
- Location in Rwanda
- Coordinates: 2.051923°S 29.414434°E
- Country: Rwanda
- Province: Western
- District: Karongi

Area
  - Town and sector: 47 km^{2} (18 sq mi)

Population (2022 census)
  - Town and sector: 40,337
  - Density: 860/km^{2} (2,200/sq mi)
  - Urban: 15,012
- Climate: Aw

Rubengera, also known as Mabanza, is a town and sector in Rwanda. The town is the capital of Karongi District in Western Province, Rwanda.

Rubengera lies in the western mountains of Rwanda between Lake Kivu and the divide that separates the catchments of the Congo River to the west and the Nile. Around 1880 King Kigeli Rwabugiri created a new royal residence at Rubengera on his return from a military expedition to today's North Kivu. It was innovative in its much grander scale than previous residences. Despite its remote location, members of the Tutsi aristocracy were drawn to the new court. The court included granaries in which food was stored, in part to feed the members of the court, but in part to support a supply of relief food to the poor of the region, particularly before the next harvest.

A Protestant mission was established at Rubengera in 1909. In World War I was Rubengera a German prisoner-of-war camp for captured Belgian soldiers, military hospital for German soldiers and headquarters of the Commander in Chief of the German troops in Rwanda, Max Wintgens. In 1938 a track was opened that connected Rubengera to Kabgayi to the east. This is the basis for the main road that today connects the region to the east. During the Rwandan genocide, on 9 April 1994 militiamen from Rutsiro attacked the Tutsis in Mabanza. On 12 April, two hundred refugees from the presbytery were evacuated by bus to the Gatwaro Football Stadium in Kibuye, where most of them were killed. Just over ten percent of the Tutsis in Rubengera survived the massacre.

In July 2012 it was announced that the Rubengera Technical Secondary School would open in January 2013, giving training in carpentry and wood technology. The private school was launched by the Protestant "Abaja ba Kristo" sisterhood.

== Climate ==
Climate data for Rubengera (1991–2020)
Month	Jan	Feb	Mar	Apr	May	Jun	Jul	Aug	Sep	Oct	Nov	Dec	Year
Record high °C (°F)	33.0 (91.4)	32.4 (90.3)	32.3 (90.1)	32.4 (90.3)	30.3 (86.5)	32.0 (89.6)	31.3 (88.3)	31.8 (89.2)	33.1 (91.6)	35.3 (95.5)	34.4 (93.9)	33.6 (92.5)	35.3 (95.5)
Mean daily maximum °C (°F)	26.0 (78.8)	25.8 (78.4)	26.0 (78.8)	26.2 (79.2)	25.4 (77.7)	26.2 (79.2)	26.2 (79.2)	26.5 (79.7)	26.8 (80.2)	26.4 (79.5)	26.2 (79.2)	25.7 (78.3)	26.1 (79.0)
Daily mean °C (°F)	20.6 (69.1)	20.6 (69.1)	20.8 (69.4)	20.8 (69.4)	20.6 (69.1)	20.5 (68.9)	20.2 (68.4)	20.6 (69.1)	21.2 (70.2)	21.0 (69.8)	20.7 (69.3)	20.7 (69.3)	20.7 (69.3)
Mean daily minimum °C (°F)	15.3 (59.5)	15.4 (59.7)	15.7 (60.3)	15.5 (59.9)	15.7 (60.3)	14.8 (58.6)	14.3 (57.7)	14.7 (58.5)	15.6 (60.1)	15.5 (59.9)	15.3 (59.5)	15.6 (60.1)	15.3 (59.5)
Record low °C (°F)	10.5 (50.9)	11.0 (51.8)	10.4 (50.7)	12.0 (53.6)	10.5 (50.9)	7.5 (45.5)	8.0 (46.4)	8.0 (46.4)	9.6 (49.3)	10.0 (50.0)	10.4 (50.7)	10.4 (50.7)	7.5 (45.5)
Average precipitation mm (inches)	84.2 (3.31)	92.3 (3.63)	80.8 (3.18)	166.2 (6.54)	115.2 (4.54)	134.7 (5.30)	55.3 (2.18)	14.0 (0.55)	52.1 (2.05)	124.2 (4.89)	124.9 (4.92)	108.1 (4.26)	1,151.9 (45.35)
Average precipitation days (≥ 1.0 mm)	12.6	12.2	15.1	15.7	9.1	2.6	1.1	3.1	10.4	14.4	15.8	14.1	126.2
Source: NOAA

== Notable people ==
- Consolee Nishimwe - author, speaker, and survivor of the Rwandan genocide
