= Evelyn Hofer =

German-American photographer (1922-2009)

- Evelyn Hofer, 1951
- Born: January 21, 1922; Marburg, Germany
- Died: November 2, 2009 (aged 87); Mexico City, Mexico
- Known for: Photography
- Website: www.evelynhofer.com

Evelyn Hofer (January 21, 1922 – November 2, 2009) was a German-American portrait and documentary photographer.

== Life and work ==
Hofer was born in Marburg, Germany. The family moved to Geneva in 1933 in order to escape Nazism, and later to Madrid. Evelyn attempted unsuccessfully to enter the Paris Conservatory and then switched to photography, first apprenticing in Zurich and Basel and then taking private tuition in Zürich.

After Franco came to power they moved again, to Mexico in the early 1940s. It was in Mexico that she had her first work as a professional photographer. She moved to New York in 1946, where she worked with Alexey Brodovitch of Harper's Bazaar and befriended Richard Lindner and Saul Steinberg.

Hofer used a four-by-five inch view camera to make orderly and well-constructed portraits and scenic photographs. Her style centered on straightforward compositions that were clear, but not simple. Her portraits show subjects looking lost, sad, or at least ambiguous.

She died in Mexico City, Mexico, aged 87.

== Books ==
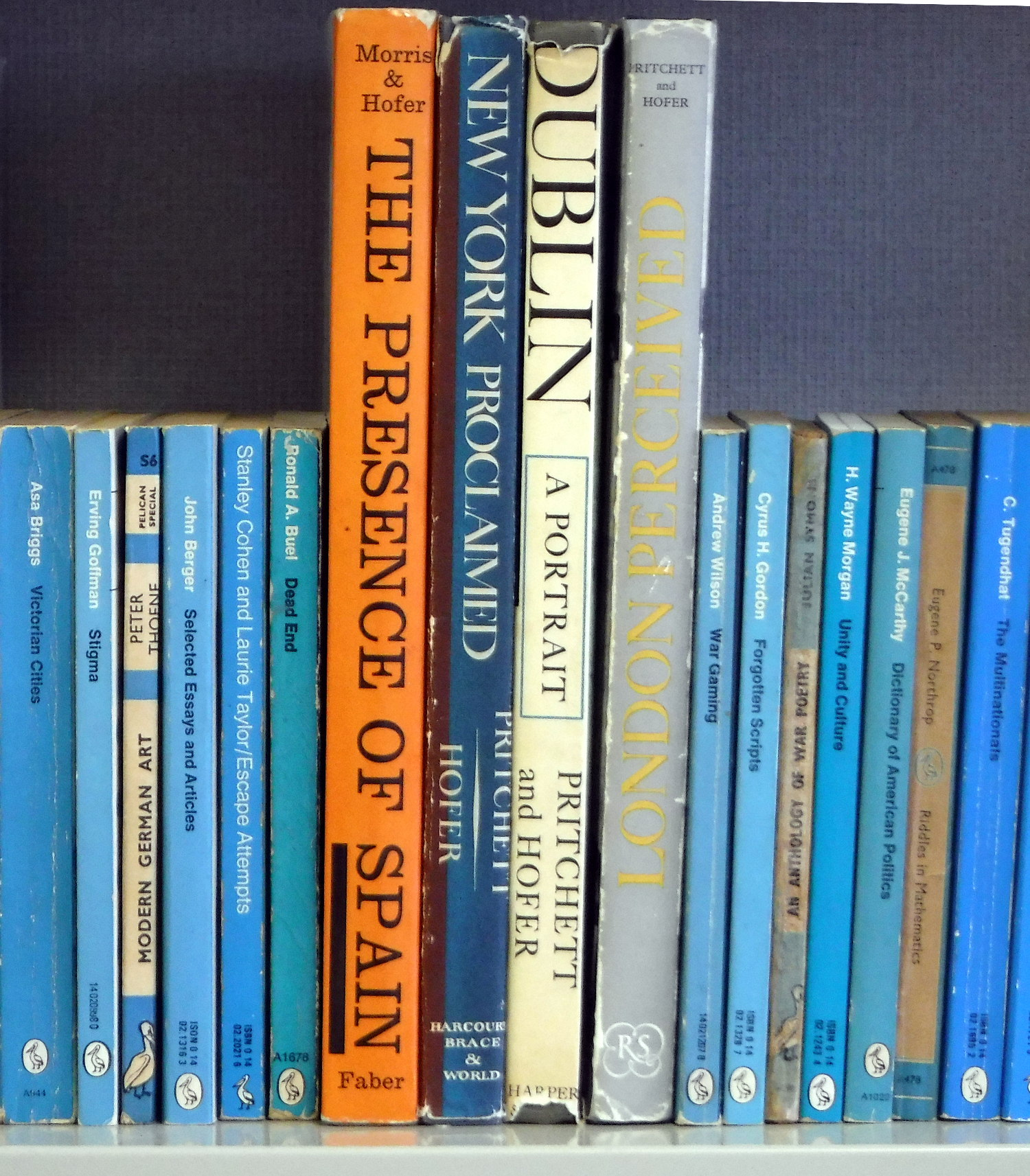
Some books with photography by Evelyn Hofer (flanked by irrelevant Pelicans)

- Los encantos de Méjico. Text by Maurice Sandoz. OCLC 20045899 (Note: The WorldCat record for this says "[México, Kamin, 1953?]".)
- The Pleasures of Mexico. Text by Maurice Sandoz. New York: Kamin, 1957. OCLC 16273402 (Note: The British edition of this book (London: Guilford Press, 1955; OCLC 248675251) is instead illustrated by Rolf Dürig.)
- The Stones of Florence. Text by Mary McCarthy. London: Heinemann, 1956. New York: Harcourt, Brace, Jovanovich, 1959. London: Heinemann, 1976. ISBN 0434461040. San Diego: Harcourt Brace Jovanovich, 1987. ISBN 0151850798.
- Florenz. Text by Mary McCarthy. Gütersloh: Bertelsmann, 1960.
- London Perceived. Text by V. S. Pritchett. New York: Harcourt, Brace & World, 1962. London: Chatto & Windus / Heinemann, 1962. London: Hogarth, 1986. ISBN 0701207191. Boston: Godine, 1990. ISBN 1567921485. London: Penguin, 2003. ISBN 0141014199. London: Bloomsbury, 2011. ISBN 9781448200962.
- London. Herz und Antlitz einer Stadt. Text by V. S. Pritchett, trans. Margot Berthold. Munich and Zurich: Droemer, 1964.
- New York Proclaimed. Text by V. S. Pritchett. Chatto & Windus / Heinemann, 1965. New York: Harcourt, Brace & World, 1965. London: Reprint Society, 1966.
- New York. Herz und Antlitz einer Stadt. Text by V. S. Pritchett. Munich and Zurich: Droemer, 1966.
- Dublin: A Portrait. Text by V. S. Pritchett. New York: Harper & Row, 1967. London: Bodley Head, 1967. London: Hogarth, 1991. ISBN 0701207507. London: Bloomsbury, 2011. ISBN 9781448200740.
- The Presence of Spain. Text by James Morris. New York: Harcourt, Brace & World, 1964. London: Faber & Faber, 1964.
- Spanje zoals het is. Text by James Morris. The Hague: Gaade, 1965.
- Spanien. Porträt eines stolzen Landes. Text by James Morris, trans. Kai Molvig. Berlin: Deutsche Buch-Gemeinschaft, 1967. Knaur-Taschenbücher 176. Munich: Droemer, 1968.
- The Evidence of Washington. Text by William Walton. New York: Harper & Row, 1966. London: Bodley Head, 1967.
- Portrait: Theory: Photographs and Essays by David Attie, Chuck Close, Jan Groover, Evelyn Hofer, Lotte Jacobi, Gerard Malanga, Robert Mapplethorpe and James Van Der Zee. Edited by Kelly Wise. New York: Lustrum, 1981.
- Emerson in Italy. Text by Ralph Waldo Emerson and Evelyn Barish. New York: Holt, 1989. ISBN 0805009140.
- Evelyn Hofer: Photographs. Lausanne: Musée de l'Élysée, 1994. OCLC 32357975.
- Evelyn Hofer. Edited by Susanne Breidenbach. Göttingen: Steidl, 2004. ISBN 3-86521-057-0. Galerie m. ISBN 3-923791-32-1.

== Collections ==
- Getty Museum
- Museum of Fine Arts Houston

== Exhibitions ==
Hofer has been the subject of numerous exhibitions including ones at the Peter Blum Gallery (2005), Deutsche Börse AG, The Cube, Eschborn (2021-2022), a retrospective at the Fotomuseum Den Haag (2006), and a traveling exhibit (Eyes on the City) which traveled to the High Museum of Art and Nelson-Atkins Museum of Art in 2023-2024.
