= Gasenyi =

Town in Karongi, Western, Rwanda

- Location in Rwanda
- Coordinates: 2°10′36″S 29°26′43″E
- Country: Rwanda
- Admin. Province: Western Province
- District: Karongi

Population (2012)
  - Total: 3,000
- Climate: Aw

Gasenyi is a town in Karongi District, Western Province, Rwanda, located between the Gitesi and Mutuntu sectors. The population in 2012 was over 3000. It contains the Karongi Tea Factory, the Musango Health Center, and a secondary school called ES Gasenyi.
