= Rugabano =

Sector in western Rwanda

Coordinates: 2.1072°S 29.4844°E

Rugabano is a sector (umurenge) in Karongi District, in Western Province, Rwanda. Its office is near Gakuta center, on the foot of Gisunzu mount. Its capital is Rugabano market, in a center of shops and cattle market (isoko ry'inka).also contain secondary school es rugabano where Niyigena Christian studied o level school 2011 to 2013.

The sector also contains Ngoma, where Baziruwiha Jean Claude was born.
