= Karongi =

Karongi District
- District
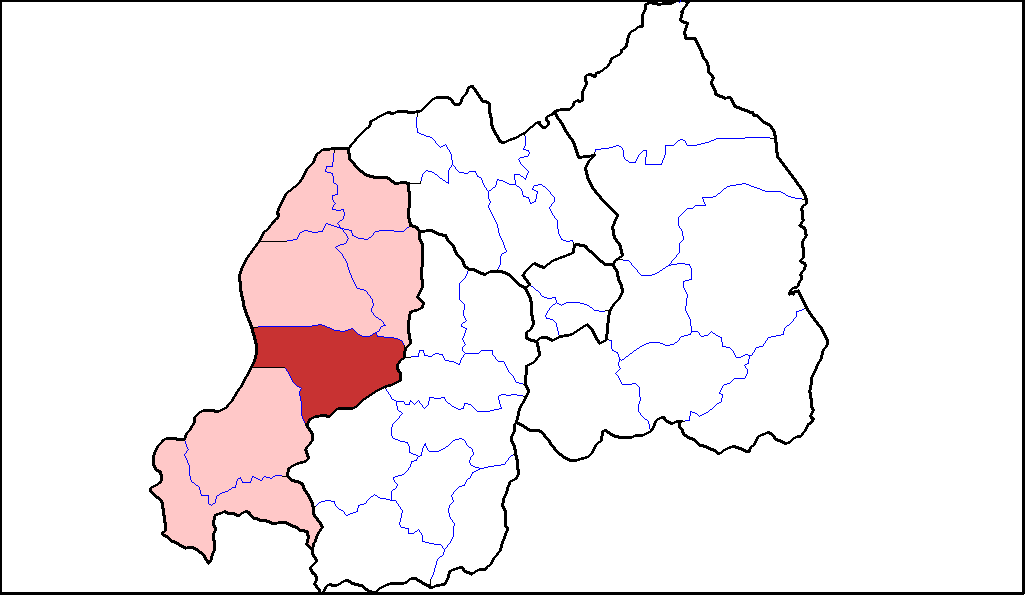
- Shown within Western Province and Rwanda
- Coordinates: 2.151°S 29.395°E
- Country: Rwanda
- Province: Western
- Capital: Rubengera

Area
  - District: 992.7 km^{2} (383.3 sq mi)

Population (2022 census)
  - District: 373,869
  - Density: 376.6/km^{2} (975.4/sq mi)
  - Urban: 33,542
  - Rural: 340,327

Karongi is a district (akarere) in Western Province, Rwanda. The district's capital is Rubengera. However, it comprises Kibuye, provincial capital and a major Rwandan lakeside resort. It is one of the districts with the lowest population density of 380 inhabitants per square kilometre (980/sq mi) as of the 2022 census.

== Tourism ==
Tourism is one of Karongi's main economic sectors. The main source of Karongi's popularity comes from the popular attraction of Lake Kivu. There are many resorts and hotels which have been built in recent years outside the town of Kibuye, most of which are on the shores of Lake Kivu. One of the most frequently visited islands in Karongi is Napoleon Island, which is known for straw-coloured fruit bats and district-provided hiking trails.. Other islands in Karongi are Monkey Island, which has a small population of vervet monkeys, and Amahoro or Peace Island. Another source of tourism comes from traditional night fishing.

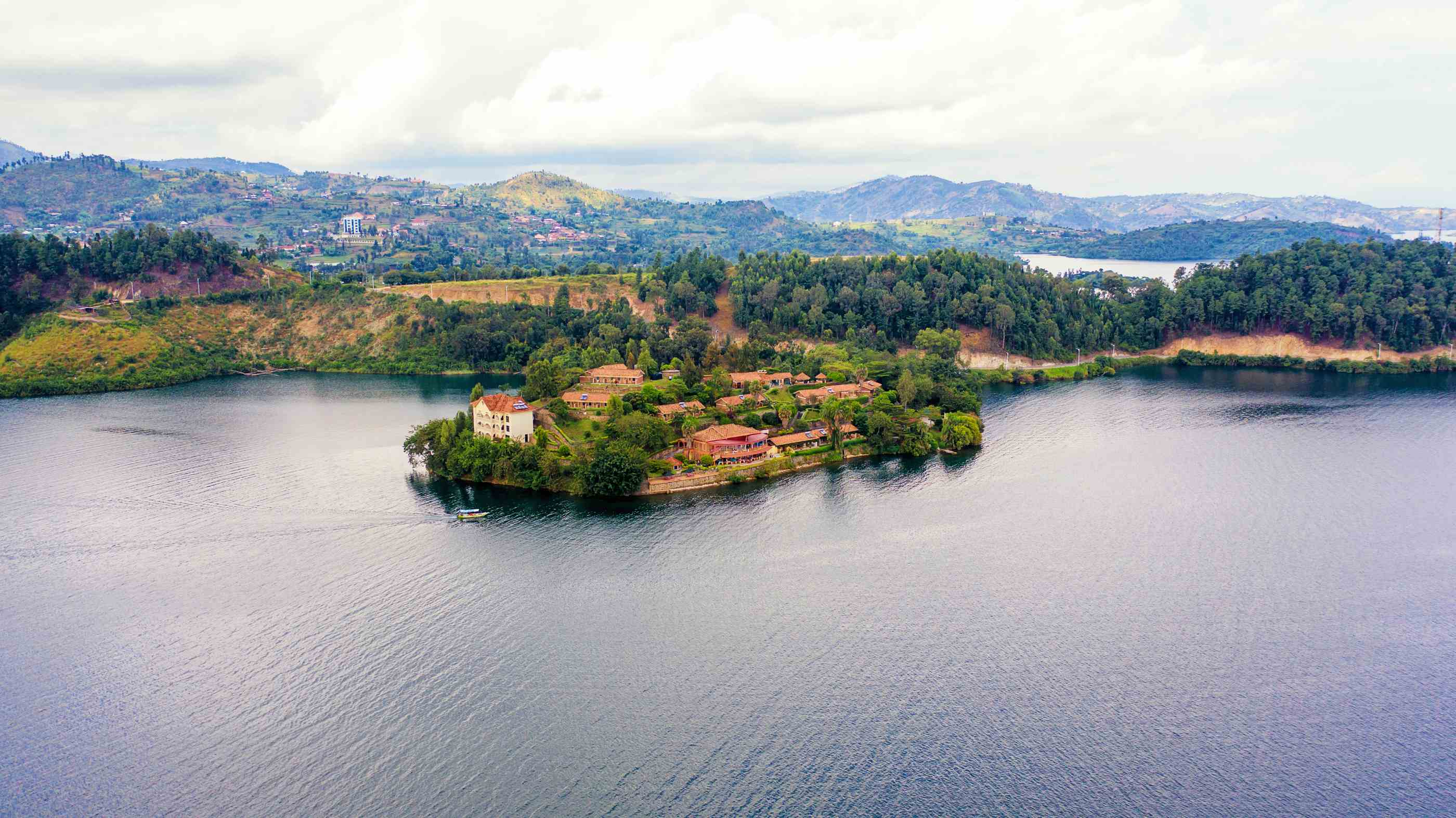
Aerial view of Bethany Hotel B in Karongi

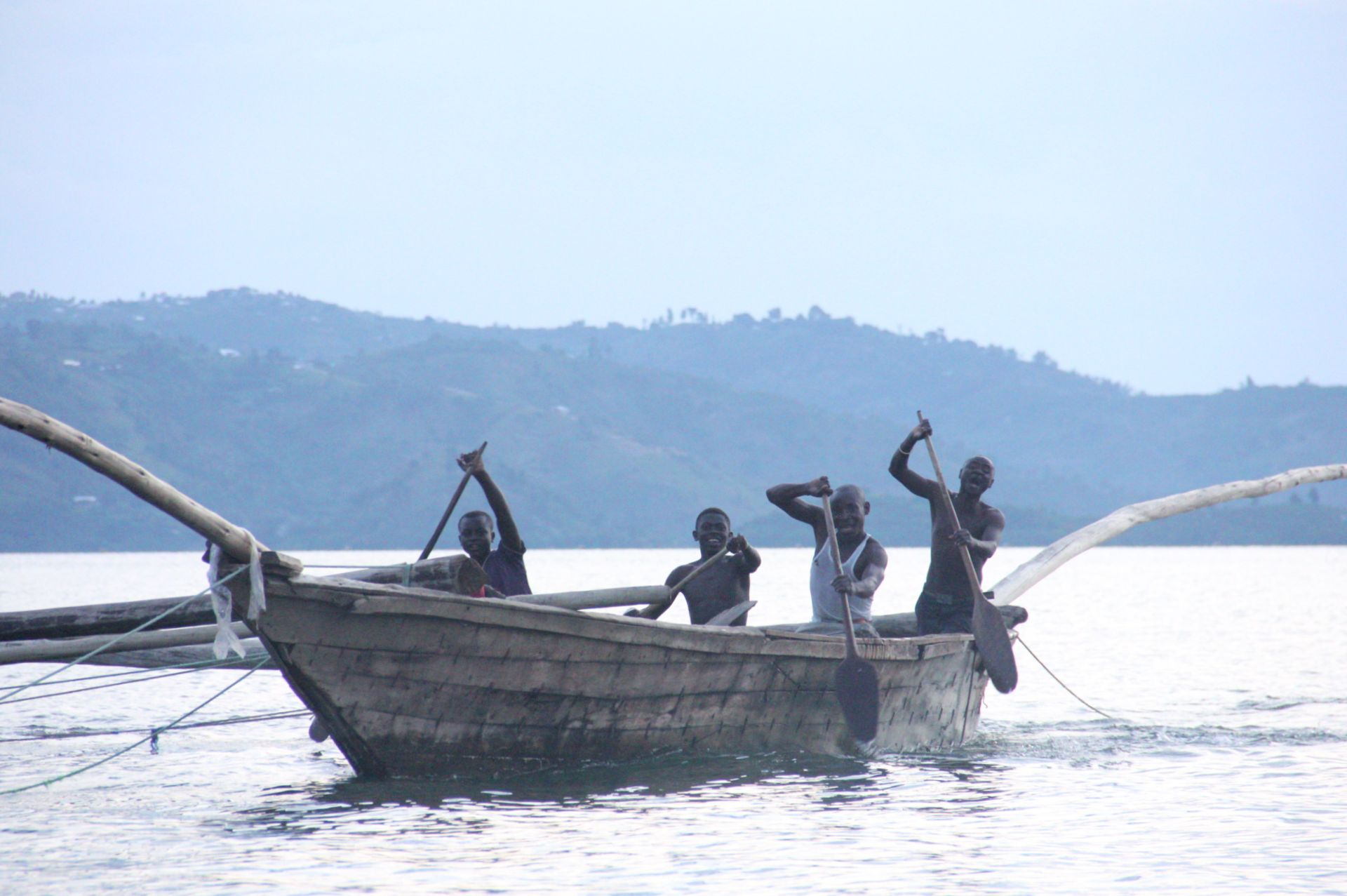
Night Fishermen on Lake Kivu

== Geography ==
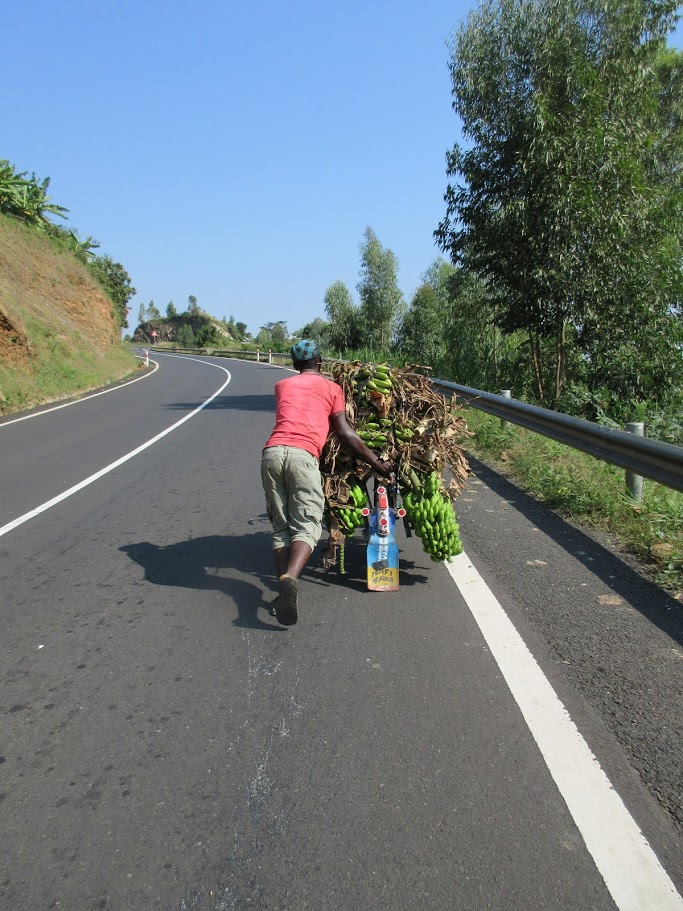
Cyclist transporting bananas on a steep road near Gitesi.

The district lies on the shores of Lake Kivu, about halfway down the lake between Gisenyi and Rusizi. Rubengera is approximately 100 km from the national capital, Kigali.

== Sectors ==
The Karongi district is divided into 13 sectors (imirenge): Bwishyura, Mutuntu, Rubengera, Gitesi, Ruganda, Rugabano, Gishyita, Gishari, Mubuga, Murambi, Murudi, Rwankuba and Twumba.
