= Provinces of Rwanda =

Map of provinces, 2006-

The provinces of Rwanda (Kinyarwanda: intara) are divided into districts (akarere) and municipalities (umujyi). Prior to 1 January 2006, Rwanda was composed of 12 provinces. The Rwandan government decided to establish new provinces in an attempt to address issues that arose from the genocide against the Tutsis, such as decentralising power and the "suppression of reminders of the genocide". The new provinces were to be "ethnically-diverse administrative areas" instead.

Until 2002, the provinces were called prefectures (perefegitura).

== Administrative divisions ==
Since 1 January 2006, the administrative divisions of Rwanda comprise four provinces and the City of Kigali:

Administrative divisions of Rwanda
| Province / City | Kinyarwanda name | Capital / Seat | Area (km^{2}) | Population (2022 census) | Density (per km^{2}) |
|---|---|---|---|---|---|
| City of Kigali | Umujyi wa Kigali | Nyarugenge | 730 | 1,745,555 | 2,391 |
| Southern Province | Amajyepfo | Nyanza | 5,963 | 3,002,699 | 503.6 |
| Western Province | Iburengerazuba | Kibuye | 5,883 | 2,896,484 | 492.4 |
| Northern Province | Amajyaruguru | Byumba | 3,276 | 2,038,511 | 622.3 |
| Eastern Province | Iburasirazuba | Rwamagana | 9,458 | 3,563,145 | 376.7 |

== Provincial districts and sectors ==
=== Eastern Province ===
| Province | District | Sector | District | Sector | District | Sector | District | Sector |
|---|---|---|---|---|---|---|---|---|
| Eastern Province | Nyagatare | Rwimiyaga | Bugesera | Gashora | Ngoma | Gashanda | Rwamagana | Fumbwe |
| Eastern Province | Nyagatare | Karangazi | Bugesera | Juru | Ngoma | Jarama | Rwamagana | Gahengeri |
| Eastern Province | Nyagatare | Nyagatare | Bugesera | Kamabuye | Ngoma | Karembo | Rwamagana | Gishari |
| Eastern Province | Nyagatare | Katabagemu | Bugesera | Ntarama | Ngoma | Kazo | Rwamagana | Karenge |
| Eastern Province | Nyagatare | Rukomo | Bugesera | Mareba | Ngoma | Kibungo | Rwamagana | Kigabiro |
| Eastern Province | Nyagatare | Tabagwe | Bugesera | Mayange | Ngoma | Mugesera | Rwamagana | Muhazi |
| Eastern Province | Nyagatare | Musheli | Bugesera | Musenyi | Ngoma | Murama | Rwamagana | Munyaga |
| Eastern Province | Nyagatare | Gatunda | Bugesera | Mwogo | Ngoma | Mutenderi | Rwamagana | Munyiginya |
| Eastern Province | Nyagatare | Mimuli | Bugesera | Ngeruka | Ngoma | Remera | Rwamagana | Musha |
| Eastern Province | Nyagatare | Karama | Bugesera | Nyamata | Ngoma | Rukira | Rwamagana | Muyumbu |
| Eastern Province | Nyagatare | Matimba | Bugesera | Nyarugenge | Ngoma | Rukumberi | Rwamagana | Mwulire |
| Eastern Province | Nyagatare | Mukama | Bugesera | Rilima | Ngoma | Rurenge | Rwamagana | Nyakariro |
| Eastern Province | Nyagatare | Rwempasha | Bugesera | Ruhuha | Ngoma | Sake | Rwamagana | Nzige |
| Eastern Province | Nyagatare | Kiyombe | Bugesera | Rweru | Ngoma | Zaza | Rwamagana | Rubona |
| Eastern Province | Gatsibo | Gasange | Bugesera | Shyara | Kirehe | Gahara | | |
| Eastern Province | Gatsibo | Gatsibo | Kayonza | Gahini | Kirehe | Gatore | | |
| Eastern Province | Gatsibo | Gitoki | Kayonza | Kabare | Kirehe | Kigarama | | |
| Eastern Province | Gatsibo | Kabarore | Kayonza | Kabarondo | Kirehe | Kigina | | |
| Eastern Province | Gatsibo | Kageyo | Kayonza | Mukarange | Kirehe | Kirehe | | |
| Eastern Province | Gatsibo | Kiramuruzi | Kayonza | Murama | Kirehe | Mahama | | |
| Eastern Province | Gatsibo | Kiziguro | Kayonza | Murundi | Kirehe | Mpanga | | |
| Eastern Province | Gatsibo | Muhura | Kayonza | Mwiri | Kirehe | Musaza | | |
| Eastern Province | Gatsibo | Murambi | Kayonza | Ndego | Kirehe | Mushikiri | | |
| Eastern Province | Gatsibo | Ngarama | Kayonza | Nyamirama | Kirehe | Nasho | | |
| Eastern Province | Gatsibo | Nyagihanga | Kayonza | Rukara | Kirehe | Nyamugari | | |
| Eastern Province | Gatsibo | Remera | Kayonza | Ruramira | Kirehe | Nyarubuye | | |
| Eastern Province | Gatsibo | Rugarama | Kayonza | Rwinkwavu | | | | |
| Eastern Province | Gatsibo | Rwimbogo | | | | | | |

=== Northern Province ===
| Province | District | Sector | District | Sector | District | Sector |
|---|---|---|---|---|---|---|
| Northern Province | Burera | Bungwe | Gicumbi | Bukure | Rulindo | Base |
| Northern Province | Burera | Butaro | Gicumbi | Bwisige | Rulindo | Burega |
| Northern Province | Burera | Cyanika | Gicumbi | Byumba | Rulindo | Bushoki |
| Northern Province | Burera | Cyeru | Gicumbi | Cyumba | Rulindo | Buyoga |
| Northern Province | Burera | Gahunga | Gicumbi | Giti | Rulindo | Cyinzuzi |
| Northern Province | Burera | Gatebe | Gicumbi | Kaniga | Rulindo | Cyungo |
| Northern Province | Burera | Gitovu | Gicumbi | Manyagiro | Rulindo | Kinihira |
| Northern Province | Burera | Kagogo | Gicumbi | Miyove | Rulindo | Kisaro |
| Northern Province | Burera | Kinoni | Gicumbi | Kageyo | Rulindo | Masoro |
| Northern Province | Burera | Kinyababa | Gicumbi | Mukarange | Rulindo | Mbogo |
| Northern Province | Burera | Kivuye | Gicumbi | Muko | Rulindo | Murambi |
| Northern Province | Burera | Nemba | Gicumbi | Mutete | Rulindo | Ngoma |
| Northern Province | Burera | Rugarama | Gicumbi | Nyamiyaga | Rulindo | Ntarabana |
| Northern Province | Burera | Rugendabari | Gicumbi | Nyankenke II | Rulindo | Rukozo |
| Northern Province | Burera | Ruhunde | Gicumbi | Rubaya | Rulindo | Rusiga |
| Northern Province | Burera | Rusarabuge | Gicumbi | Rukomo | Rulindo | Shyorongi |
| Northern Province | Burera | Rwerere | Gicumbi | Rushaki | Rulindo | Tumba |
| Northern Province | Gakenke | Busengo | Gicumbi | Rutare | | |
| Northern Province | Gakenke | Coko | Gicumbi | Ruvune | | |
| Northern Province | Gakenke | Cyabingo | Gicumbi | Rwamiko | | |
| Northern Province | Gakenke | Gakenke | Gicumbi | Shangasha | | |
| Northern Province | Gakenke | Gashenyi | Musanze | Busogo | | |
| Northern Province | Gakenke | Mugunga | Musanze | Cyuve | | |
| Northern Province | Gakenke | Janja | Musanze | Gacaca | | |
| Northern Province | Gakenke | Kamubuga | Musanze | Gashaki | | |
| Northern Province | Gakenke | Karambo | Musanze | Gataraga | | |
| Northern Province | Gakenke | Kivuruga | Musanze | Kimonyi | | |
| Northern Province | Gakenke | Mataba | Musanze | Kinigi | | |
| Northern Province | Gakenke | Minazi | Musanze | Muhoza | | |
| Northern Province | Gakenke | Muhondo | Musanze | Muko | | |
| Northern Province | Gakenke | Muyongwe | Musanze | Musanze | | |
| Northern Province | Gakenke | Muzo | Musanze | Nkotsi | | |
| Northern Province | Gakenke | Nemba | Musanze | Nyange | | |
| Northern Province | Gakenke | Ruli | Musanze | Remera | | |
| Northern Province | Gakenke | Rusasa | Musanze | Rwaza | | |
| Northern Province | Gakenke | Rushashi | Musanze | Shingiro | | |

=== Western Province ===
| Province | District | Sector | District | Sector | District | Sector | District | Sector |
|---|---|---|---|---|---|---|---|---|
| Western Province | Karongi | Bwishyura | Nyabihu | Bigogwe | Rubavu | Bugeshi | Rutsiro | Boneza |
| Western Province | Karongi | Gishyita | Nyabihu | Jenda | Rubavu | Busasamana | Rutsiro | Gihango |
| Western Province | Karongi | Gishari | Nyabihu | Jomba | Rubavu | Cyanzarwe | Rutsiro | Kigeyo |
| Western Province | Karongi | Gitesi | Nyabihu | Kabatwa | Rubavu | Gisenyi | Rutsiro | Kivumu |
| Western Province | Karongi | Mubuga | Nyabihu | Karago | Rubavu | Kanama | Rutsiro | Manihira |
| Western Province | Karongi | Murambi | Nyabihu | Kintobo | Rubavu | Kanzenze | Rutsiro | Mukura |
| Western Province | Karongi | Murundi | Nyabihu | Mukamira | Rubavu | Mudende | Rutsiro | Murunda |
| Western Province | Karongi | Mutuntu | Nyabihu | Muringa | Rubavu | Nyakiliba | Rutsiro | Musasa |
| Western Province | Karongi | Rubengera | Nyabihu | Rambura | Rubavu | Nyamyumba | Rutsiro | Mushonyi |
| Western Province | Karongi | Rugabano | Nyabihu | Rugera | Rubavu | Nyundo | Rutsiro | Mushubati |
| Western Province | Karongi | Ruganda | Nyabihu | Rurembo | Rubavu | Rubavu | Rutsiro | Nyabirasi |
| Western Province | Karongi | Rwankuba | Nyabihu | Shyira | Rubavu | Rugerero | Rutsiro | Ruhango |
| Western Province | Karongi | Twumba | Nyamasheke | Ruharambuga | Rusizi | Bugarama | Rutsiro | Rusebeya |
| Western Province | Ngororero | Bwira | Nyamasheke | Bushekeri | Rusizi | Butare | | |
| Western Province | Ngororero | Gatumba | Nyamasheke | Bushenge | Rusizi | Bweyeye | | |
| Western Province | Ngororero | Hindiro | Nyamasheke | Cyato | Rusizi | Gikundamvura | | |
| Western Province | Ngororero | Kabaya | Nyamasheke | Gihombo | Rusizi | Gashonga | | |
| Western Province | Ngororero | Kageyo | Nyamasheke | Kagano | Rusizi | Giheke | | |
| Western Province | Ngororero | Kavumu | Nyamasheke | Kanjongo | Rusizi | Gihundwe | | |
| Western Province | Ngororero | Matyazo | Nyamasheke | Karambi | Rusizi | Gitambi | | |
| Western Province | Ngororero | Muhanda | Nyamasheke | Karengera | Rusizi | Kamembe | | |
| Western Province | Ngororero | Muhororo | Nyamasheke | Kirimbi | Rusizi | Muganza | | |
| Western Province | Ngororero | Ndaro | Nyamasheke | Macuba | Rusizi | Mururu | | |
| Western Province | Ngororero | Ngororero | Nyamasheke | Nyabitekeri | Rusizi | Nkanka | | |
| Western Province | Ngororero | Nyange | Nyamasheke | Mahembe | Rusizi | Nkombo | | |
| Western Province | Ngororero | Sovu | Nyamasheke | Rangiro | Rusizi | Nkungu | | |
| | | | Nyamasheke | Shangi | Rusizi | Nyakabuye | | |
| | | | | | Rusizi | Nyakarenzo | | |
| | | | | | Rusizi | Nzahaha | | |
| | | | | | Rusizi | Rwimbogo | | |

=== Southern Province ===
| Province | District | Sector | District | Sector | District | Sector | District | Sector |
|---|---|---|---|---|---|---|---|---|
| Southern Province | Gisagara | Gikonko | Kamonyi | Gacurabwenge | Nyamagabe | Buruhukiro | Nyaruguru | Cyahinda |
| Southern Province | Gisagara | Gishubi | Kamonyi | Karama | Nyamagabe | Cyanika | Nyaruguru | Busanze |
| Southern Province | Gisagara | Kansi | Kamonyi | Kayenzi | Nyamagabe | Gatare | Nyaruguru | Kibeho |
| Southern Province | Gisagara | Kibilizi | Kamonyi | Kayumbu | Nyamagabe | Kaduha | Nyaruguru | Mata |
| Southern Province | Gisagara | Kigembe | Kamonyi | Mugina | Nyamagabe | Kamegeli | Nyaruguru | Munini |
| Southern Province | Gisagara | Mamba | Kamonyi | Musambira | Nyamagabe | Kibirizi | Nyaruguru | Kivu |
| Southern Province | Gisagara | Muganza | Kamonyi | Ngamba | Nyamagabe | Kibumbwe | Nyaruguru | Ngera |
| Southern Province | Gisagara | Mugombwa | Kamonyi | Nyamiyaga | Nyamagabe | Kitabi | Nyaruguru | Ngoma |
| Southern Province | Gisagara | Mukindo | Kamonyi | Nyarubaka | Nyamagabe | Mbazi | Nyaruguru | Nyabimata |
| Southern Province | Gisagara | Musha | Kamonyi | Rugalika | Nyamagabe | Mugano | Nyaruguru | Nyagisozi |
| Southern Province | Gisagara | Ndora | Kamonyi | Rukoma | Nyamagabe | Musange | Nyaruguru | Muganza |
| Southern Province | Gisagara | Nyanza | Kamonyi | Runda | Nyamagabe | Musebeya | Nyaruguru | Ruheru |
| Southern Province | Gisagara | Save | Muhanga | Muhanga | Nyamagabe | Mushubi | Nyaruguru | Ruramba |
| Southern Province | Huye | Gishamvu | Muhanga | Cyeza | Nyamagabe | Nkomane | Nyaruguru | Rusenge |
| Southern Province | Huye | Karama | Muhanga | Kibangu | Nyamagabe | Gasaka | Ruhango | Kinazi |
| Southern Province | Huye | Kigoma | Muhanga | Kiyumba | Nyamagabe | Tare | Ruhango | Byimana |
| Southern Province | Huye | Kinazi | Muhanga | Mushishiro | Nyamagabe | Uwinkingi | Ruhango | Bweramana |
| Southern Province | Huye | Maraba | Muhanga | Kabacuzi | Nyanza | Busasamana | Ruhango | Mbuye |
| Southern Province | Huye | Mbazi | Muhanga | Nyabinoni | Nyanza | Busoro | Ruhango | Ruhango |
| Southern Province | Huye | Mukura | Muhanga | Nyamabuye | Nyanza | Cyabakamyi | Ruhango | Mwendo |
| Southern Province | Huye | Ngoma | Muhanga | Nyarusange | Nyanza | Kibirizi | Ruhango | Kinihira |
| Southern Province | Huye | Ruhashya | Muhanga | Rongi | Nyanza | Kigoma | Ruhango | Ntongwe |
| Southern Province | Huye | Huye | Muhanga | Rugendabari | Nyanza | Mukingo | Ruhango | Kabagari |
| Southern Province | Huye | Rusatira | Muhanga | Shyogwe | Nyanza | Muyira | | |
| Southern Province | Huye | Rwaniro | | | Nyanza | Ntyazo | | |
| Southern Province | Huye | Simbi | | | Nyanza | Nyagisozi | | |
| Southern Province | Huye | Tumba | | | Nyanza | Rwabicuma | | |

=== City of Kigali ===
| City | District | Sector | District | Sector | District | Sector |
|---|---|---|---|---|---|---|
| City of Kigali | Gasabo | Bumbogo | Kicukiro | Gahanga | Nyarugenge | Gitega |
| City of Kigali | Gasabo | Gatsata | Kicukiro | Gatenga | Nyarugenge | Kanyinya |
| City of Kigali | Gasabo | Jali | Kicukiro | Gikondo | Nyarugenge | Kigali |
| City of Kigali | Gasabo | Gikomero | Kicukiro | Kagarama | Nyarugenge | Kimisagara |
| City of Kigali | Gasabo | Gisozi | Kicukiro | Kanombe | Nyarugenge | Mageragere |
| City of Kigali | Gasabo | Jabana | Kicukiro | Kicukiro | Nyarugenge | Muhima |
| City of Kigali | Gasabo | Kinyinya | Kicukiro | Kigarama | Nyarugenge | Nyakabanda |
| City of Kigali | Gasabo | Ndera | Kicukiro | Masaka | Nyarugenge | Nyamirambo |
| City of Kigali | Gasabo | Nduba | Kicukiro | Niboye | Nyarugenge | Nyarugenge |
| City of Kigali | Gasabo | Rusororo | Kicukiro | Nyarugunga | Nyarugenge | Rwezamenyo |
| City of Kigali | Gasabo | Rutunga | | | | |
| City of Kigali | Gasabo | Kacyiru | | | | |
| City of Kigali | Gasabo | Kimihurura | | | | |
| City of Kigali | Gasabo | Kimironko | | | | |
| City of Kigali | Gasabo | Remera | | | | |

== Former provinces ==
Prior to 2006 the provinces were:

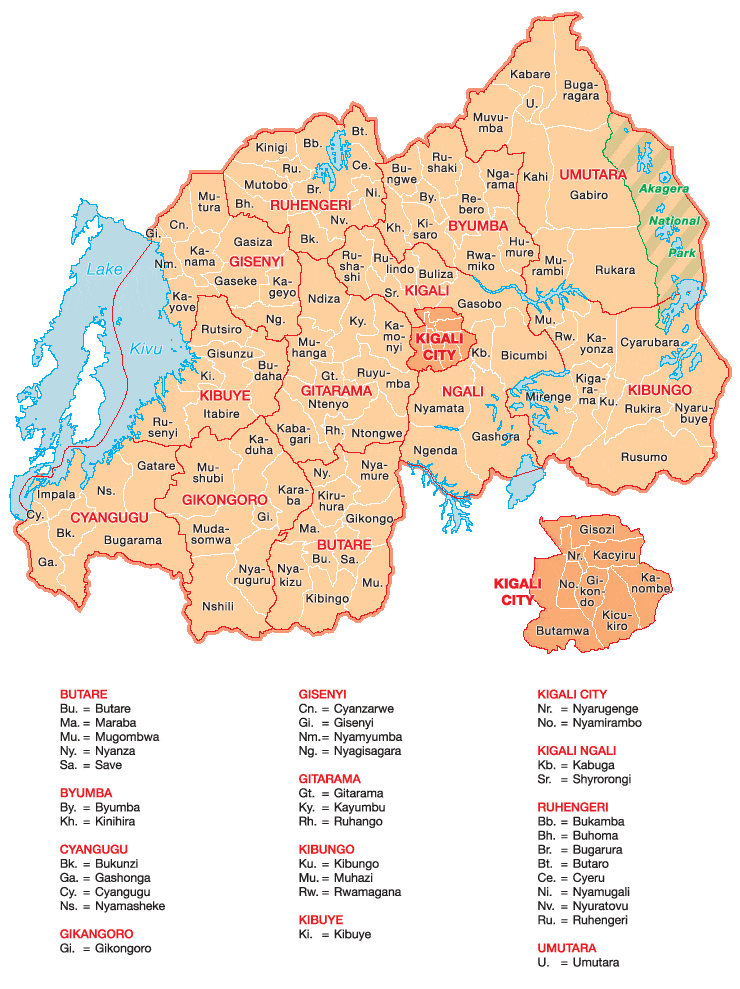
Administrative division between 2002 and 2006.

The 11 prefectures and 145 communes of Rwanda during the genocide in 1994.

Communes of Rwanda prior to 2002, after the formation of Umutara prefecture in 1996.

- Butare Province
- Byumba Province
- Cyangugu Province
- Gikongoro Province
- Gisenyi Province
- Gitarama Province
- Kibungo Province
- Kibuye Province
- Kigali City (Established as a province in 1990)
- Kigali-Rural Province (Kigali Ngali)
- Ruhengeri Province
- Umutara Province (Established in August 1996)

== See also ==
- Districts of Rwanda
- List provinces of Rwanda by Human Development Index
- List of Rwanda districts by population
- ISO 3166-2:RW
