= Ruramira =

- Sector
- Location in Rwanda
- Coordinates: 01°59′56″S 30°29′56″E
- Country: Rwanda
- Province: Eastern Province
- District: Kayonza District

Area
  - Sector: 41.57 km^{2} (16.05 sq mi)
- Elevation: 1,550 m (5,090 ft)

Population (2022 census)
  - Sector: 21,185
  - Density: 509.6/km^{2} (1,320/sq mi)
  - Urban: 0
  - Rural: 21,185

Ruramira (Kinyarwanda Umurenge wa Ruramira) is one of the 12 sectors in Kayonza District in Rwanda's Eastern Province.

== Geography ==
Ruramira covers an area of 41.57 km^{2} and lies at an altitude of about 1,550 m. The sector is divided into four cells: Bugambira, Nkamba, Ruyonza and Umubuga. It borders the sector of Nyamirama to the north, Kabarondo to the east, Remera to the south, Munyaga to the southwest, Kigabiro to the west and Muhazi to the northwest.

== Demographics ==
The census in 2022 put the population at 21,185. Ten years earlier, it was 16,937, which corresponds to an annual population increase of 2.3 percent between 2012 and 2022.
