= Kibungo Province =

Former province of Rwanda, incorporated as part of the Eastern Province in 2006

- Former province
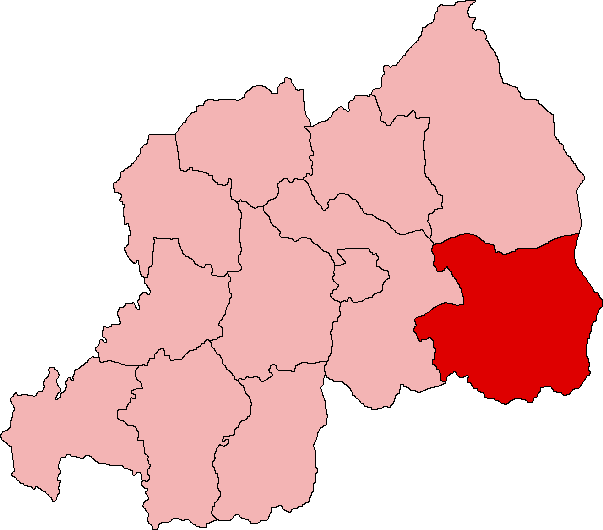
- Location of Kibungo Province in Rwanda
- Country: Rwanda
- Dissolved: 2006
- Seat: Kibungo
- Districts and municipalities: District of Rusumo; District of Rukira; District of Nyarubuye; District of Mirenge; Municipality of Kibungo; District of Kigarama; Municipality of Rwamagana; District of Muhazi; District of Kayonza; District of Cyarubare

Kibungo was a south-eastern province of Rwanda near the border with Tanzania. It was known for its production of bananas. In 2006, it became part of the new Eastern Province.

Kibungo Municipality is also a municipality within the province.

Districts and municipalities:

1. District of Rusumo
2. District of Rukira
3. District of Nyarubuye
4. District of Mirenge
5. Municipality of Kibungo
6. District of Kigarama
7. Municipality of Rwamagana
8. District of Muhazi
9. District of Kayonza
10. District of Cyarubare
