= Kibungo (disambiguation) =

Kibungo may refer to

- Kibungo, a city and district in the south-east of Rwanda, in the new Eastern Province.
- Kibungo Province, a former province of Rwanda, incorporated as part of the Eastern Province in 2006.
- Kibungo Municipality, a municipal district in the former province of Kibungo.
