= Gahara =

Coordinates: 02°20′31.2″S 30°30′57.6″E

- Sector
- Location in Rwanda
- Country: Rwanda
- Province: Eastern Province
- District: Kirehe District

Area
  - Total: 106.3 km^{2} (41.0 sq mi)
- Elevation: 1,430 m (4,690 ft)

Population (2022 census)
  - Total: 44,462
  - Density: 418.3/km^{2} (1,083/sq mi)

Gahara is one of the 12 sectors in Kirehe District in Eastern Province in Rwanda.

== Geography ==
Gahara covers an area of 106.3 km^{2} and lies at an altitude of about 1,390 m. The sector is divided into five cells: Butezi, Muhamba, Murehe, Nyagasenyi and Rubimba. It borders Mutenderi to the northwest, Murama to the north and Gatore to the east. To the southwest, Gahara borders the Kagera Nile, which forms the border with Burundi.

== Demographics ==
The population was 44,462 at the census of 2022. Ten years earlier, it had been 39,484, which corresponds to an annual population increase of 1.2 percent between 2012 and 2022.

== Transport ==
A district road runs through the sector, which was not paved as of 2022.
