= Kabare, Rwanda =

Sector of Rwanda

Location of Kabare (red) within Kayonza district

Kabare (Kinyarwanda Umurenge wa Kabare) is one of the 12 sectors in Kayonza District of Eastern Province, Rwanda

== Geography ==
Kabare covers an area of 110.7 km^{2} and lies at an altitude of about 1,580 m. The sector is divided into five cells: Cyarubare, Gitara, Kirehe, Rubimba and Rubumba. Neighboring sectors are Mwiri to the north, Ndego to the east, Nasho to the southeast, Rukira to the south, Kibungo to the southwest, Murama to the west and Rwinkwavu to the northwest. The sector borders Lake Nasho to the east.

== Demographics ==
The census in 2022 put the population at 40,228. Ten years earlier, it had been 34,460, which corresponds to an annual population increase of 1.6 percent between 2012 and 2022.

== Transport ==
The National Road 25 runs through the sector.
