= Murundi (sector) =

Coordinates: 01°39′25.2″S 30°35′58.8″E

- Sector and town
- Location in Rwanda
- Country: Rwanda
- Province: Eastern Province
- District: Kayonza District

Area
  - Total: 491.0 km^{2} (189.6 sq mi)
- Elevation: 1,320 m (4,330 ft)

Population (2022 census)
  - Total: 57,809
  - Density: 117.7/km^{2} (304.9/sq mi)

Location of Murundi (red) within Kayonza district

Murundi (Kinyarwanda: Umurenge wa Murundi) is one of the 12 sectors in Kayonza District in Eastern Province in Rwanda.

== Geography ==
Murundi covers an area of 491.0 km^{2} and lies at an altitude of about 1,320 m. The sector is divided into four cells: Buhabwa, Karambi, Murundi and Ryamanyoni. It borders on the Rwimbogo sector to the north, the Mwiri sector to the southeast, the Gahini sector to the south, the Rukara sector to the southwest and the Kiziguro and Rugarama sectors to the west. In the east, the sector borders the Kagera Nile, which forms the border with Tanzania. The eastern half of the sector is part of the Akagera National Park. There you will find the Hago, Kivumba and Gishanju Lakes, which are located entirely or partially within the Murundi sector.

== Demographics ==
The census in 2022 put the population at 57,809. Ten years earlier, it was 35,742, which corresponds to an annual population increase of 4.9 percent between 2012 and 2022.

== Transport ==
National Route 25 runs through the sector.
