= Murama =

Location of Murama (red) within Kayonza district

Murama (Kinyarwanda: Umurenge wa Murama) is one of the 12 sectors in Kayonza District in Rwanda's Eastern Province.

== Geography ==
Murama covers an area of 69.06 km² and lies at an altitude of about 1,680 m. The sector is divided into five cells: Bunyentongo, Muko, Murama, Nyakanazi and Rusave. It borders Rwinkwavu to the north, Kabare to the east, Kibungo to the south, Remera to the southwest and Kabarondo to the west..

== Demographics ==
The census of 2022 counted 23,381 inhabitants. Ten years earlier, it was 19,945, which corresponds to an annual population increase of 1.6 percent between 2012 and 2022.
