= Mukarange =

Coordinates: 01°59′56″S 30°29′56″E

- Sector and town
- Location in Rwanda
- Country: Rwanda
- Province: Eastern Province
- District: Kayonza District

Area
  - Sector and town: 53.8 km^{2} (20.8 sq mi)
- Elevation: 1,580 m (5,180 ft)

Population (2022 census)
  - Sector and town: 54,818
  - Density: 1,020/km^{2} (2,640/sq mi)
  - Rural: 29,476

Location of Mukarange (red) within Kayonza district

Mukarange (Kinyarwanda Umurenge wa Mukarange) is a town and sector in Kayonza District in Rwanda's Eastern Province. It is the capital of the district.

== Geography ==
Mukarange covers an area of 53.8 km^{2} and lies at an altitude of about 1,580 meters. The sector is divided into five cells: Bwiza, Kayonza, Mburabuturo, Nyagatovu and Rugendabari. Gahini is the neighboring sector to the north, Mwiri to the east, Nyamirama to the south and Muhazi to the west. The town of Kayonza is located within Mukarange.

== Demographics ==
The census in 2022 put the population at 54,818. Ten years earlier, it had been 42,055, which corresponds to an annual population increase of 2.7 percent between 2012 and 2022.

== Transport ==
National Road 24 runs through the sector in a north–south direction. National Road 4 branches off to the west in the center of Kayonza, and a district road branches off to the northeast.
