= Rwinkwavu =

Coordinates: 01°56′42″S 30°37′19.2″E

- Sector and town
- Location in Rwanda
- Country: Rwanda
- Province: Eastern Province
- District: Kayonza District

Area
  - Total: 92.32 km^{2} (35.64 sq mi)
- Elevation: 1,430 m (4,690 ft)

Population (2022 census)
  - Total: 36,774
  - Density: 398.3/km^{2} (1,032/sq mi)

Location of Rwinkwavu (red) within Kayonza District

Rwinkwavu (Kinyarwanda: Umurenge wa Rwinkwavu) is one of the 12 sectors in the district of Kayonza in the Eastern Province of Rwanda.

== Geography ==
Rwinkwavu sector covers an area of 92.32 km^{2} and lies at an altitude of about 1,430 m. The sector is divided into the cells Gihinga, Mbarara, Mukoyoyo and Nkondo. It borders Mwiri to the north, Kabare to the east, Murama to the south, Kabarondo to the southwest and Nyamirama to the west.

== Demographics ==
The census in 2022 put the population at 36,774. Ten years earlier, it was 28,225, which corresponds to an annual population increase of 2.7 percent between 2012 and 2022.

== Transport ==
National Road 25 runs through the eastern half of the sector. A district road branches off to the southwest.
