= Nyamirama =

Coordinates: 01°57′00″S 30°31′44.4″E

- Sector
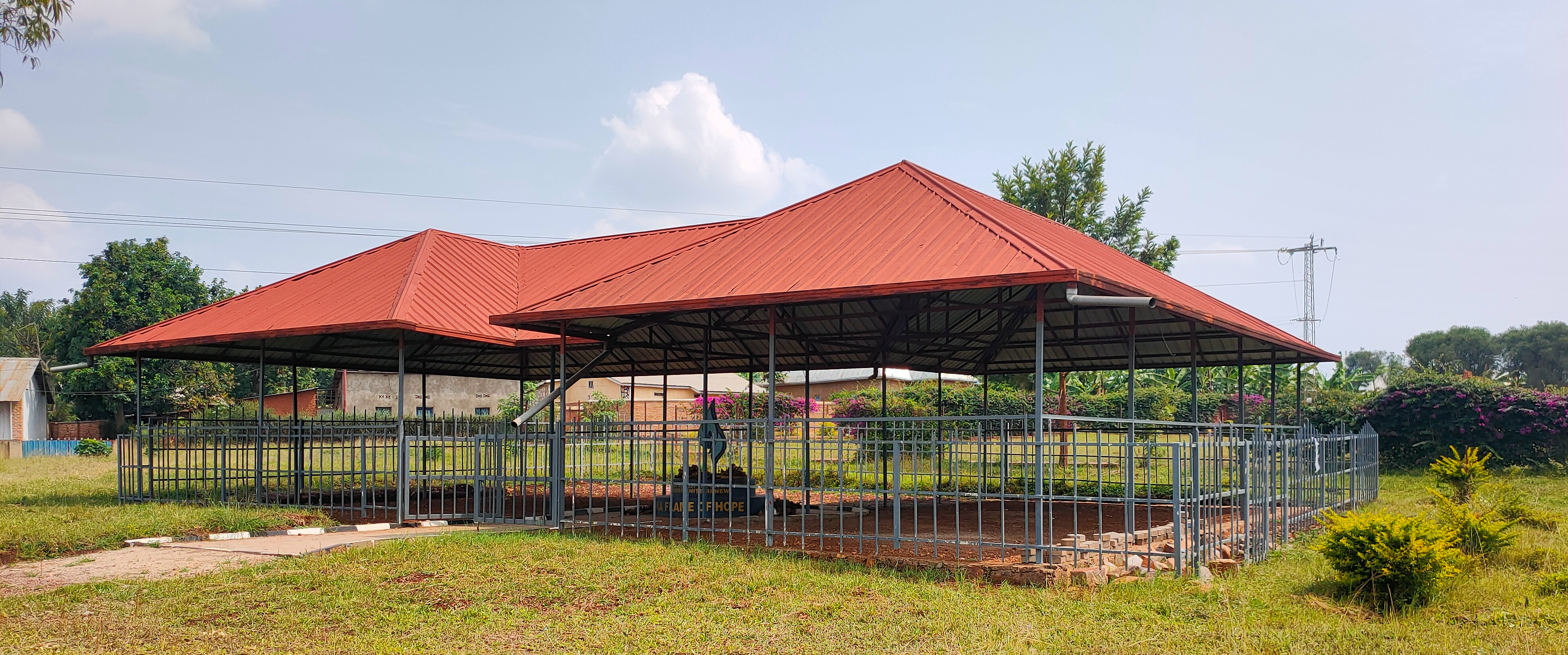
- Nyamirama Genocide Memorial

- Location in Rwanda
- Country: Rwanda
- Province: Eastern Province
- District: Kayonza District

Area
  - Total: 61.08 km^{2} (23.58 sq mi)
- Elevation: 1,600 m (5,200 ft)

Population (2022 census)
  - Total: 38,562
  - Density: 631.3/km^{2} (1,635/sq mi)

Location of Nyamirama (red) within Kayonza District

Nyamirama (Kinyarwanda: Umurenge wa Nyamirama) is one of the 12 sectors in Kayonza District in Rwanda's Eastern Province.

== Geography ==
Nyamirama covers an area of 61.08 km^{2} and lies at an altitude of about 1,600 m. The sector is divided into the cells Gikaya, Musumba, Rurambi and Shyogo. Neighboring sectors are Mukarange to the north, Rwinkwavu to the east, Kabarondo to the southeast, Ruramira to the southwest and Muhazi to the west.

== Demographics ==
The population was 38,562 at the census of 2022. Ten years earlier, it had been 30,528, which corresponds to an annual population increase of 2.4 percent between 2012 and 2022.

== Transport ==
National Road 4 runs through the sector.
