= Emmanuel Sibomana =

Rwandan actor and journalist

Emmanuel Sibomana (born January 1, 1988) is a Rwandan journalist, actor, and activist. He is best known for his role as Patrick in the BBC radio drama Urunana.

== Early life and career ==
Emmanuel Sibomana was born in Nyanza District in the southern part of Rwanda. In 2012, he began his career on Radio Rwanda. He continued as drama voice actor in Urunana (Kinyarwanda: Hand in hand) hosted on BBC Radio, where he gained recognition of his work as Patrick. Urunana is a radio drama that has focused on important issues such as family planning, HIV/AIDS awareness, gender equality, and mental health. His performances have sparked open discussions about family planning, empowering individuals to make informed and responsible decisions.

== Journalism ==
Sibomana Emmanuel began his career in entertainment journalism in 2014.

== Philanthropy ==
Sibomana donates to charity organizations working in the Gatsibo District. Those foundations include Nufashwa Yafasha owned by Jean Paul Bujyacyera, which cares for vulnerable children. He also supports young people to create innovation to any sector of work in Rwanda. Sibomana has also contributed to HIV/AIDS awareness, dispelling myths and promoting prevention strategies. His role has been especially impactful in rural areas, where radio is a vital source of information. Sibomana’s work addresses pressing social issues, including youth unemployment, domestic violence, and women’s empowerment.
