= Rusumo District =

Former district in Rwanda

Coordinates: 02°16′23″S 30°42′33″E

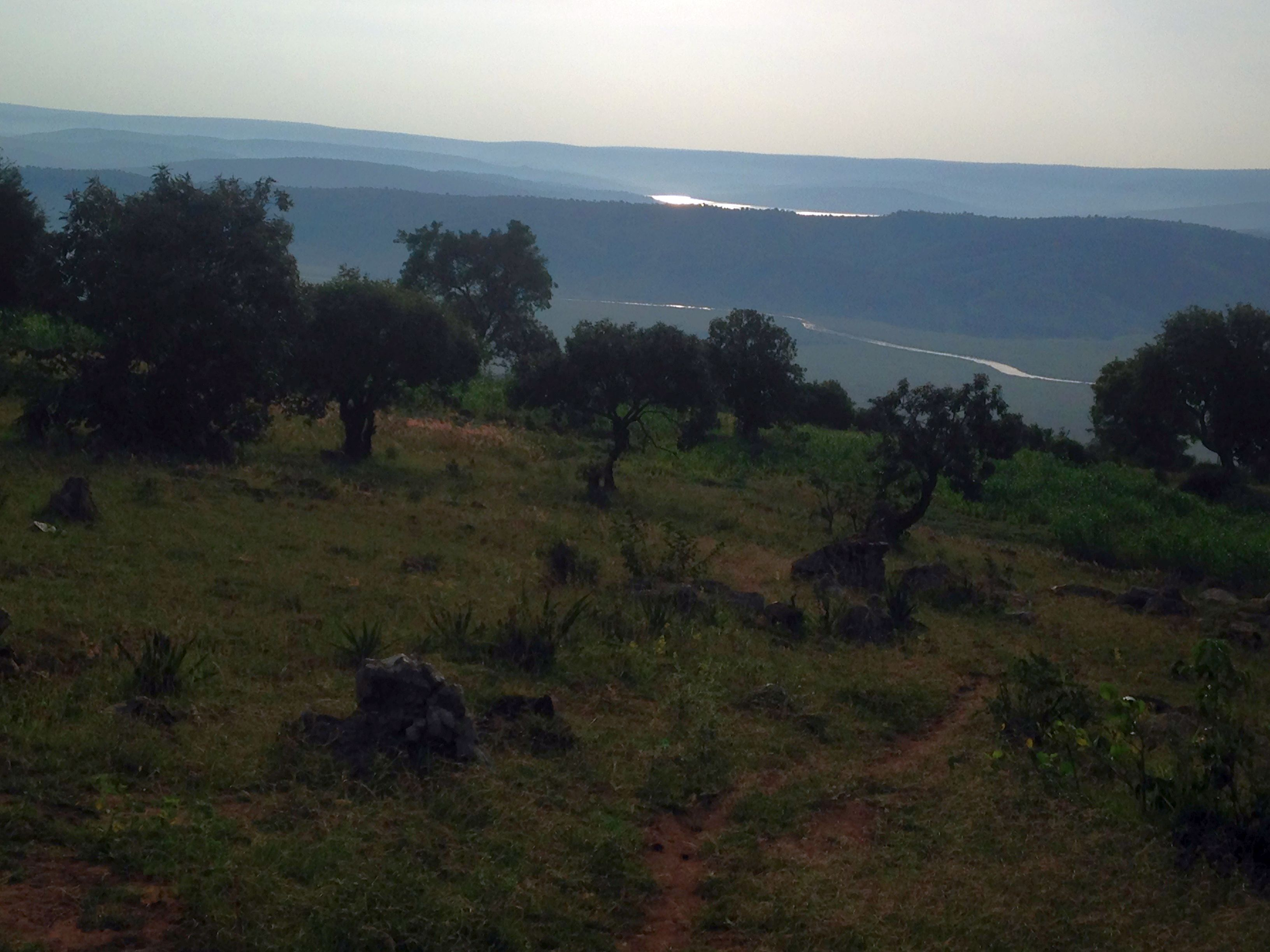
Area which could be part of Rusumo District

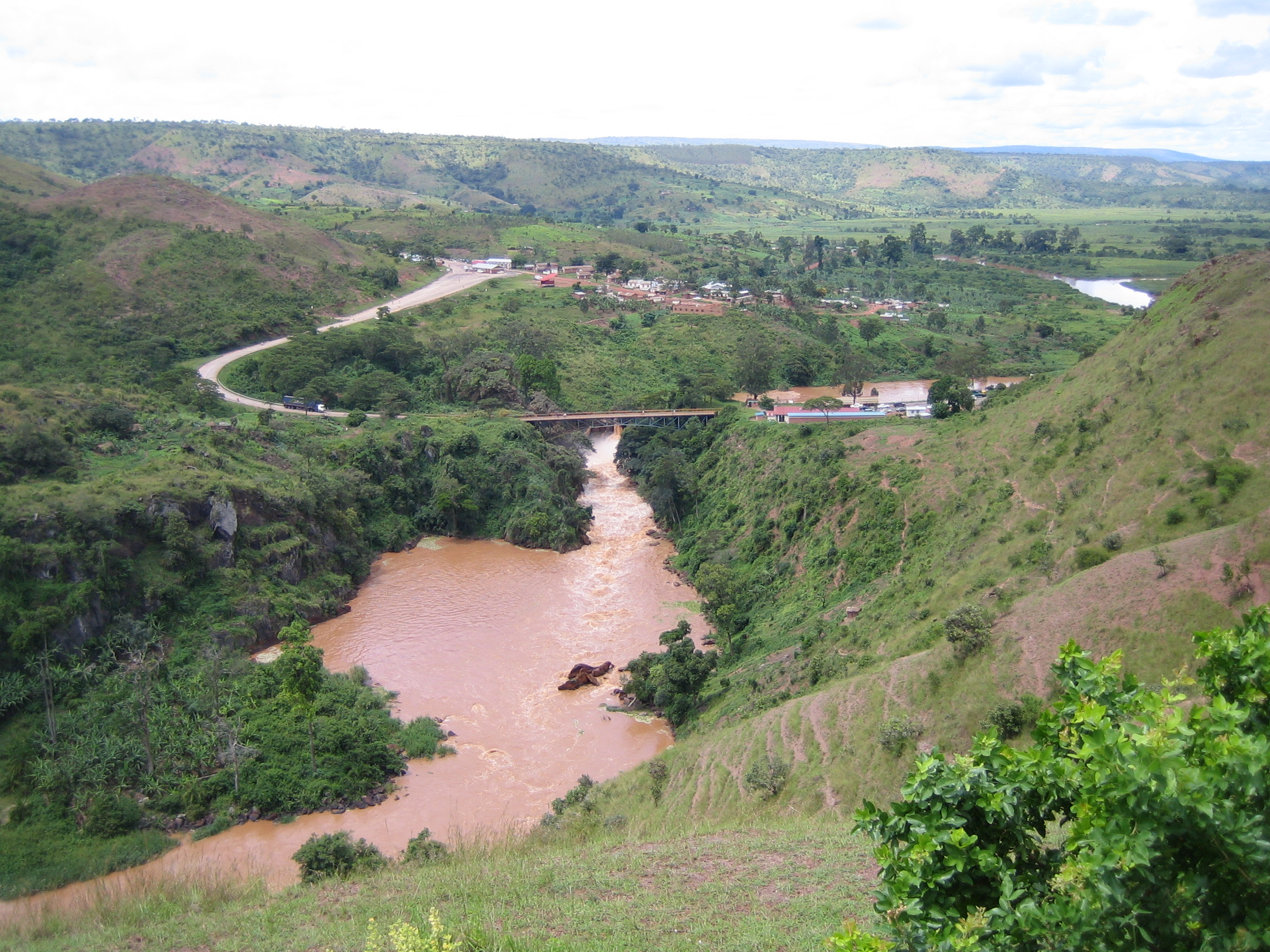
Rusumo falls

Rusumo was a district (akarere) in the former Rwandan province of Kibungo. The district was abolished, along with the Kibungo Province, during local government reorganisation in 2006. The area covered by the Rusumo district is now contained in the larger Kirehe District, within the Eastern Province. Population: 149,643 (2002 figures); area: 601 square kilometers. It is separated from Tanzania by the Kagera River, which is distinguished by the Rusumo Falls.

== Town ==
There is also a town of the same name.

== Statistics ==
- Population = 17,393

== See also ==
- Railway stations in Rwanda - proposed
