= Aloys Ndimbati =

Rwandan fugitive war criminal

Mayor of Gisovu
- In office 1990 – July 1994

Personal details
- Born: Early 1950s Gisovu, Kibuye, Rwanda
- Died: June 1997 Gatore, Kirehe District, Rwanda

Aloys Ndimbati (born in the early 1950s – 1997) was a Rwandan fugitive war criminal, wanted in connection with his alleged role in the 1994 Rwandan genocide. According to his warrant, as mayor of the Kibuye commune Gisovu, he was present at the scene of and participated in the killings of Tutsis across Kibuye.

Ndimbati has been charged with genocide, complicity in genocide, direct and public incitement to commit genocide, as well as with murder, extermination, rape and persecution as crimes against humanity. The International Criminal Tribunal for Rwanda referred his case to Rwandan authorities in June 2012.

In November 2023 it was announced that Ndimbati had already died around 26 years prior in June 1997.

== See also ==
- List of fugitives from justice who disappeared
