= Kazo, Rwanda =

Kazo
- Village and sector
- Location within Rwanda
- Coordinates: 2.18370°S 30.51519°E
- Country: Rwanda
- Province: Western Province
- District: Ngoma District

Area
  - Village and sector: 70.08 km^{2} (27.06 sq mi)

Population (2022 census)
  - Village and sector: 32,450
  - Density: 463.0/km^{2} (1,199/sq mi)
  - Urban: 4,314

Kazo is a village and sector in Ngoma District, Eastern Province in Rwanda, with a population of 32,450 (2022 census) and an area of 70.08 square kilometers.
