= Musha, Rwanda =

Village in Rwanda

Coordinates: 1°55′S 30°21′E

Musha
- Sector
- Interactive map of Musha
- Country: Rwanda
- Province: Eastern Province
- District: Rwamagana District

Area
  - Sector: 44.83 km^{2} (17.31 sq mi)

Population (2022 census)
  - Sector: 27,525
  - Density: 614.0/km^{2} (1,590/sq mi)
  - Urban: 1,607

Musha is sector in Rwanda. The village of Gikoro is located in the sector.

It was a site of a major massacre in the Rwandan genocide against the Tutsis, where over 1,000 people were killed.

Now it is known as a health center for the region.
