= Innocent Himbaza =

Rwandan Lutheran pastor and hebraist

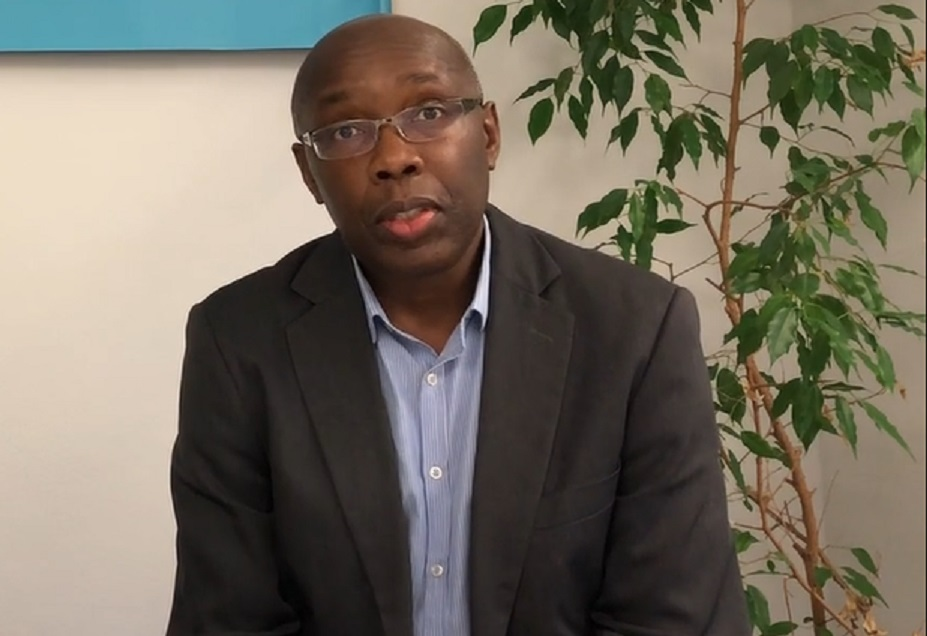
- Himbaza in 2020
- Born: July 11, 1965 (age 60); Gahini, Kayonza District, Eastern Province
- Occupation(s): Lutheran pastor, hebraist, lecturer
- Notable work: Biblia Hebraica Quinta (Leviticus)

Innocent Himbaza (born 11 July 1965) is a Rwandan-born Lutheran pastor, hebraist, and private lecturer at the University of Fribourg (Switzerland) for the exegesis of Biblical theology of the Old Testament.

== Early life and studies ==
He was born in a small rwandan village Gahini in Hutu family, to Isaïe Mbonigaba and Jeanne (née Mukagahigi). Between 1982 and 1984 was a primary school teacher in Gahini. In 1988 he graduated as a theologian in Rwanda and served two years like chaplain in Gikongoro. From 1990 was a secondary school teacher in Fribourg. During this time, he also pursued higher education at the university and since 1998 been a member of the University of Fibourg.

== Teaching and research ==
Innocent Himbaza is doctor of Theology and Humanities. Eight years was educational assistant. From 1998 he has been the Lutheran pastor of the University of Fribourg. From 1997 to 2004 he was a member of the board in the Swiss Groupes Bibliques des Ecoles et Universités. He is one of the editors of the German Bible Society and participant in their Biblia Hebraica Quinta program.

== Honours ==
In 2020, he was elected as president of the Swiss Bible Society in Bienne.

== Personal life ==
He is married to Liliane Mouron, and they have four children.

== Bibliography ==
Himbaza’s publications include;

- Le Decalogue Et L'histoire Du Texte (2004)
- King Manasseh: Legacy and the Conflict of Forgiveness (2006)
- The Bible on the Question of Homosexuality with Adrien Shenker and Jean-Baptiste Edart (2007)
- Un Carrefour Dans L'histoire De La Bible (as editor) (2008)
- Philology and Textual Criticism (as editor) (2020)
- Leviticus (2021)
