= Rukara =

Town in Kayonza, Eastern Province, Rwanda

Location of Rukara (red) within Kayonza District

Rukara is a sector and town in Kayonza district in Eastern Province in Rwanda.

== Geography ==
Rukara covers an area of 64.37 km^{2} and lies at an altitude of about 1,540 meters. The sector is divided into three cells: Kawangire, Rukara and Rwimishinya. It borders Murundi to the northeast, Gahini to the southeast, Muhazi to the south, Kiramuruzi to the southwest and Kiziguro to the northwest. The Rukara sector is bordered to the south by the Muhazi reservoir.

== Demographics ==
The census in 2022 put the population at 38,231. Ten years earlier, it was 31,176, which corresponds to an annual population increase of 2.1 percent between 2012 and 2022.

== Transport ==
National Road 24 runs through the sector along the north shore of Lake Muhazi from northwest to southeast. National Road 25 and a district road meet this road from the northeast.
