= Muyumbu =

- Town and sector
- Location within Rwanda
- Coordinates: 1.97127°S 30.24589°E
- Country: Rwanda
- Province: Eastern Province
- District: Rwamagana District

Area
  - Town and sector: 50.3 km^{2} (19.4 sq mi)

Population (2022 census)
  - Town and sector: 56,881
  - Density: 1,130/km^{2} (2,930/sq mi)
  - Urban: 37,141

Muyumbu is a town and sector in Rwamagana District, Eastern Province in Rwanda with a population of 56,881 (2022 census) and area of 50.3 square kilometers.
