= Lake Muhazi =

Lake in Rwanda

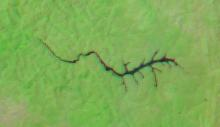
- NASA satellite image of Lake Muhazi

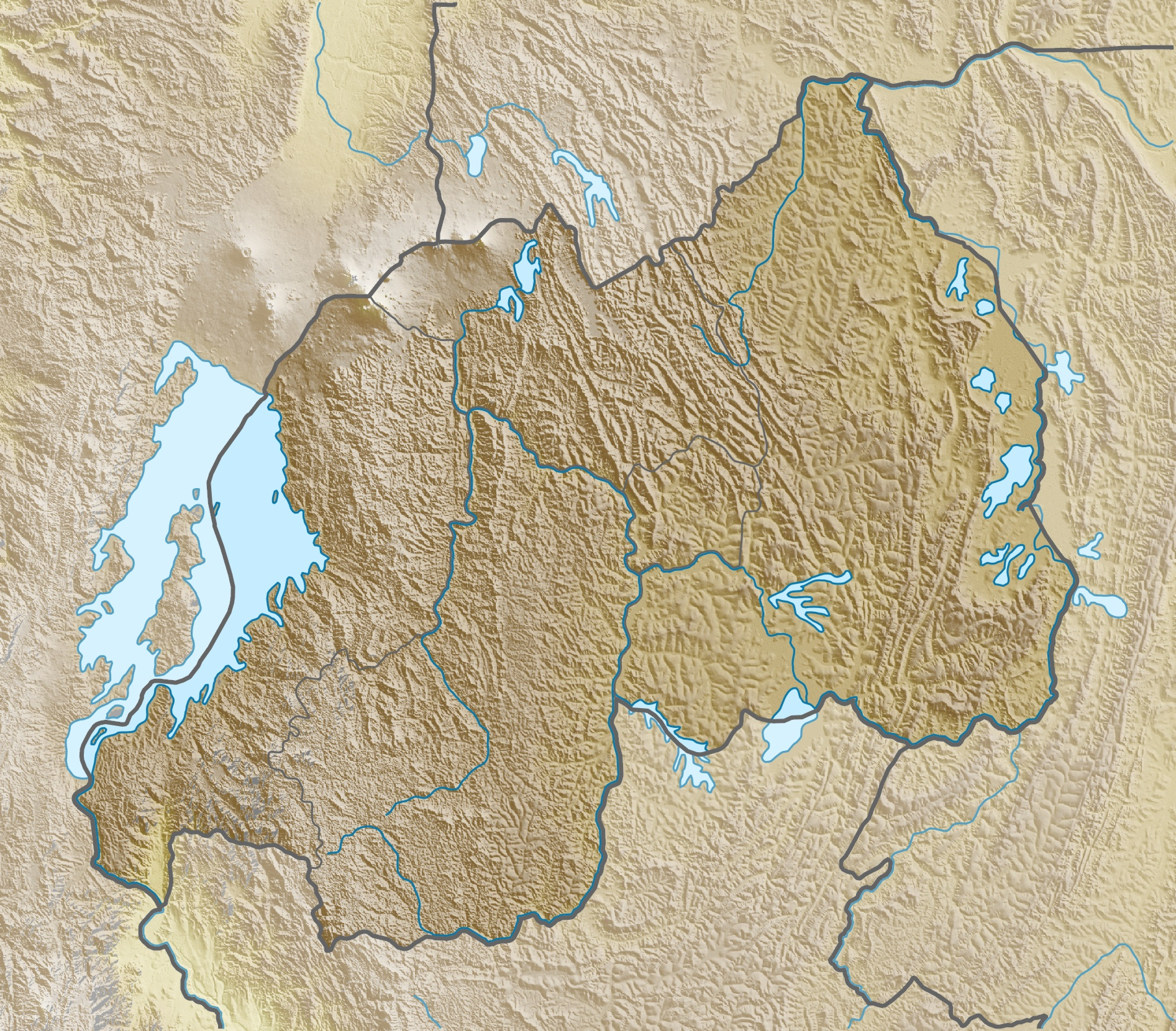
- Location within Rwanda Location within Africa

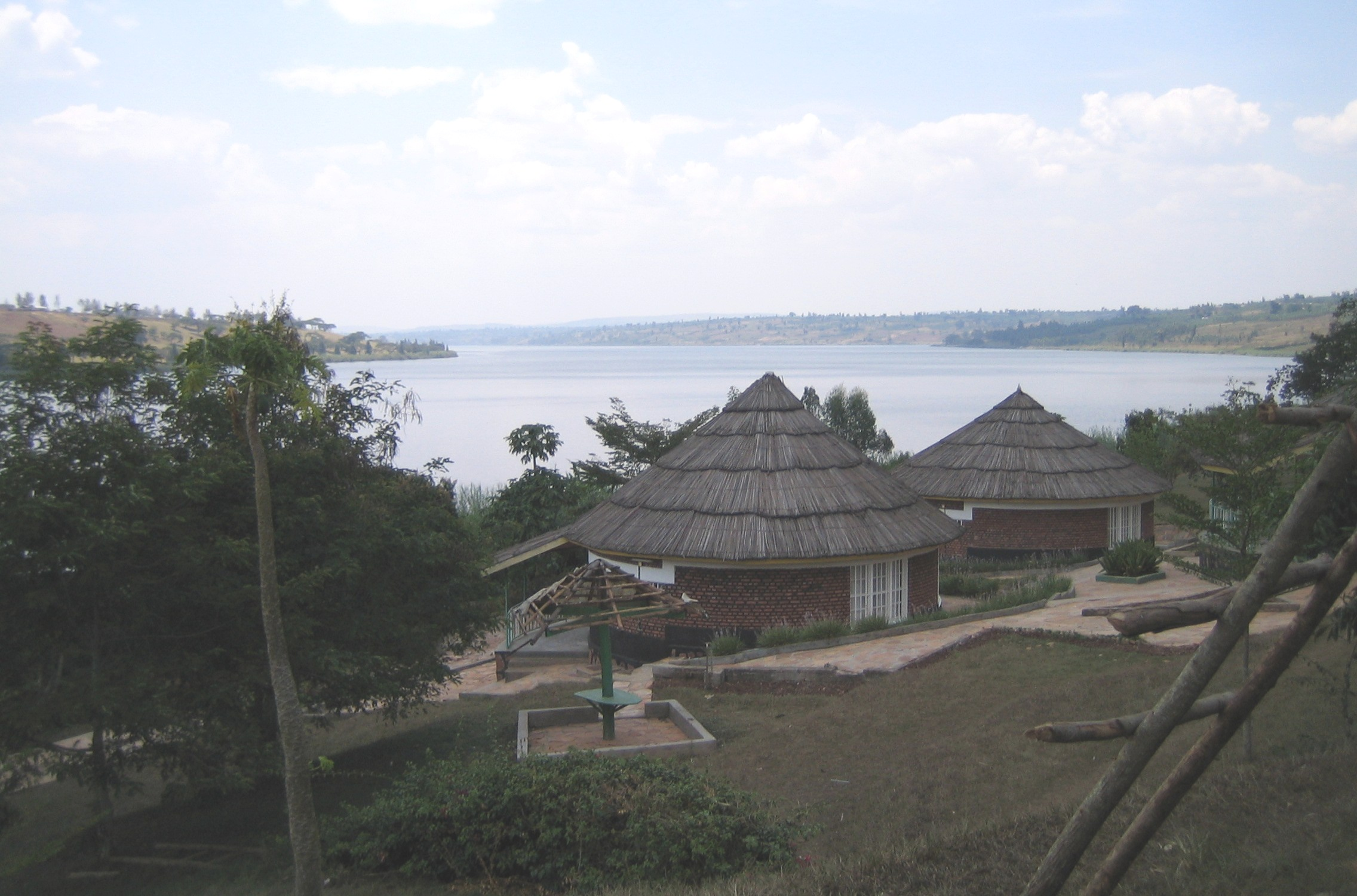
- Lake Muhazi at the Seeds of Peace centre in Gahini
- Coordinates: 1°51′S 30°24′E
- Primary outflows: Nyabugogo River
- Catchment area: 829 km^{2} (320 sq mi)
- Basin countries: Rwanda
- Max. length: 37 km (23 mi)
- Max. width: 0.6 km (0.37 mi)
- Surface area: 33 km^{2} (10 sq mi)
- Average depth: 10 m (33 ft)
- Max. depth: 14 m (46 ft)
- Water volume: 0.33 km^{3} (0 cu mi)
- Surface elevation: 1,443 m (4,734 ft)
- Settlements: Gahini, Rwesero

Lake Muhazi

Lake Muhazi (Kinyarwanda: Ikiyaga cya Muhazi) is a long, thin shallow lake in the east of Rwanda. The bulk of the lake lies in the Eastern Province, with the western end forming the border between the Northern and the City of Kigali. It is a flooded valley lake, lying predominantly in an east to west direction, but with numerous offshoots in a north to south direction, formerly the location of tributaries. The lake has a concrete dam at the western end, constructed in 1999 to replace an earth dam which had existed since time immemorial. The lake empties into the Nyabugogo River, which flows southwards to Kigali, where it meets the Nyabarongo River, part of the upper Nile.

== Description ==
Lake Muhazi is located in the eastern part of Rwanda, at coordinates 1°52′S 30°22′E. It is accessible from three of Rwanda's primary routes. The Kigali to Gatuna road passes close to the lake's western end, the Kigali to Kayonza road, which runs parallel to the lake to the south; finally, the Kayonza to Kagitumba road runs along the lakeshore for 3.8 kilometres (2.4 mi) near Gahini, before passing over two of the ridges emanating from the lake and finally leaving the lake near Kawangire. and it is a research proposal of Mediatrice, Irene and Sandra

Lake Muhazi is 60 km long, in an east–west direction, but its width is less than 5 km. It is located in east-central Rwanda and has shoreline in three of the country's five provinces. The western third of the lake forms the border between City of Kigali (Gasabo District) to the south, and Northern Province (Gicumbi District) to the north. The eastern two-thirds of the lake is in the Eastern Province, forming the border between Rwamagana District to the south, and Gatsibo and Kayonza Districts to the north.

Various meteorological and limnological observations have taken place (Plisnier, 1990, Mukankomeje et al. 1993).

== History ==
According to oral history the Kingdom of Rwanda was founded in the 14th century after disintegration of Kitara empire on the shores of Lake Muhazi in the Buganza area, close to the modern city of Rwamagana. At that time Rwanda was a small state in a loose confederation with larger and more powerful neighbours, Bugesera and Gisaka. By playing these neighbours against each other, the early kingdom flourished in the area, expanding westwards towards Lake Kivu. In this expanded kingdom, the region around the lake became a powerful religious site, being synonymous with the earliest and most revered mwamis of the kingdom. In the late 16th or early 17th centuries, the kingdom of Rwanda was invaded by the Banyoro and the kings forced to flee westward, leaving Buganza and the Lake Muhazi area in the hands of Bugesera and Gisaka.

The formation in the 17th century of a new Rwandan dynasty by mwami Ruganzu Ndori, followed by eastward invasions, the retaking of Buganza and the conquest of Bugesera, marked the beginning of the Rwandan kingdom's dominance in the area. Lake Muhazi became a border zone between Rwanda and the still independent Gisaka, a situation which remained in place for 200 years, despite several unsuccessful attempts by the Rwandan kings to subdue Gisaka. Eventually, in around 1830, Gisaka was annexed and the eastern borders of the state began to take their present form, with the lake fully under Rwandan control.

Under German and Belgian colonial rule Lake Muhazi became an important east–west transport route, linking Kigali and the west of the country with the north–south and eastbound roads from Gahini. From 1922, the eastern area was temporarily fell under British control as part of the surveying process for the proposed Cape-Cairo railway, a period during which the Church Missionary Society (CMS), started missionary and medical work across eastern Rwanda. This land was returned to Belgium in 1924 but the rulers allowed the CMS to continue its work, and a permanent mission and hospital was set up close to Lake Muhazi in Gahini village.

In common with the rest of the country, Lake Muhazi was the scene of many killings during the 1994 Rwandan genocide. Large numbers of bodies were discarded in the lake by Interahamwe militias, while others drowned attempting to escape; witnesses described the water at the time as "mixed with blood."

== Geology and climate ==
The rocks underlying Lake Muhazi vary along its length. The western end, which is flanked by high hills has a schist base, while the soil at the eastern end is granite based. This geology arose between 1400 Ma (million years ago) and 1000 Ma during the Mesoproterozoic, through folded and metamorphosed sediments, in what is known as the Kibaran orogeny. The Lake is slightly alkaline with pH ranging from 6.2 to 8.5 with a mean value of 7.8.

Lake Muhazi, in common with the rest of Rwanda, has a temperate tropical highland climate, with lower temperatures than are typical for equatorial countries due to its high elevation. Temperature measurements in Kigali, which lies approximately 21 kilometres (13 mi) south-west of the lake, show a typical daily temperature range between 12 °C (54 °F) and 27 °C (81 °F), with little variation through the year. There are two rainy seasons in the year; the first runs from February to June and the second from September to December. These are separated by two dry seasons: the major one from June to September, during which there is often no rain at all, and a shorter and less severe one from December to February.

== Flora, fauna, limnology ==
The lake is noted for its large population of spotted-necked otters (Hydrictis maculicollis) with an estimated 200 to 400 individuals in 1990, a density of around 20 individuals per 10 km of shoreline.

There are a number of bird species around the lake. These include African fish eagles (Haliaeetus vocifer), malachite kingfishers (Alcedo cristata), pied kingfishers (Ceryle rudis), swamp flycatchers (Muscicapa aquatica), village weavers (Ploceus cucullatus), speckled mousebirds (Colius striatus), black-lored (Turdoides melanops) and arrow-marked (T. jardineii) babblers, African paradise-flycatchers (Terpsiphone viridis), scarlet-chested (Nectarinia senegalensis), bronze (N. kilimensis) and green-headed (N. verticalis) sunbirds, yellow-fronted canaries (Serinus mozambicus), green-winged pytilias (Pytilia melba), great cormorant (Phalacrocorax carbo) and white-breasted (P. lucidus) cormorants, openbill (Anastomus lamelligerus) and yellow-billed (Mycteria ibis) storks and cattle egrets (Bubulcus ibis). There is also a pair of semi-domesticated grey crowned cranes (Balearica regulorum) at the Jambo Beach resort in Gahini.

The population of Haplochromis (Gaurochromis) sp fishes at Lake Muhazi and its possible exploitation was studied and compared with another population of Haplochromis (Gaurochromis) sp at Lake Ihema (Rwanda).

Various fish species have been introduced to the lake over the years, including marbled lungfish (Protopterus aethiopicus) in 1989, and tilapia at various times including 2003 and 2009, in an attempt to reduce reliance on imports.

Historical changes in environmental conditions and various limnological observations of lake Muhazi have been studied.

The phytoplankton of the lake is predominantly Microcystis aeruginosa and Ceratium hirundinella.

== Economy and tourism ==
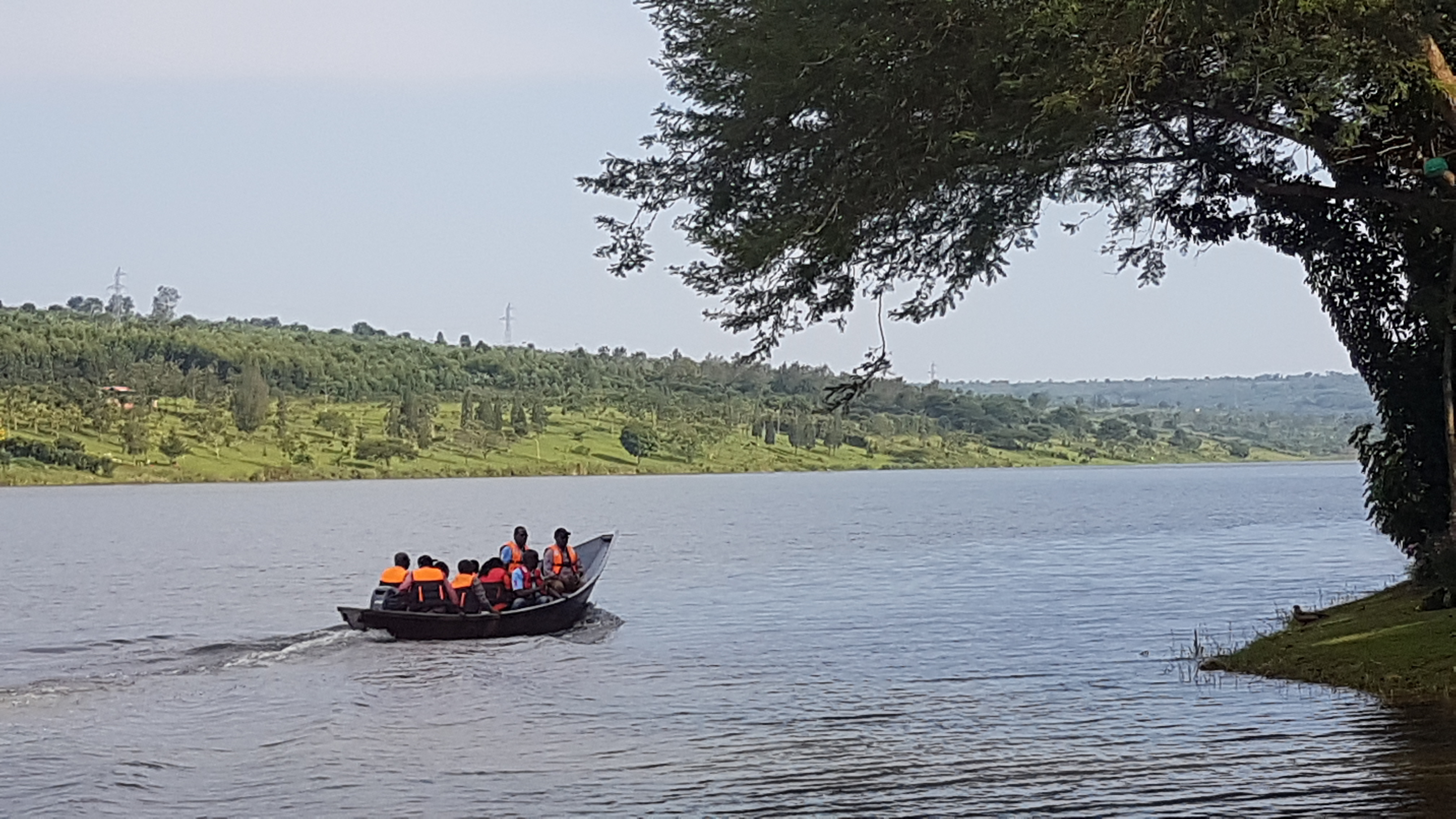
Passenger tour boat on lake Muhazi

The Muhazi lake shore at Gahini is popular with tourists and features two resorts: the Seeds of Peace centre, which offers accommodation, and Jambo Beach. These are used both as stop off points for journeys to or from Akagera National Park, and as venues for lake tourism, offering boating, fishing and bird watching. There are also several resorts at Rwesero, on the north-eastern shore of the lake, including Rwesero Beach, offering camping accommodation and also popular with day-trippers from Kigali.

A new resort, the Lake Muhazi Golf & Country Resort and Boulevard, is planned for the southern shore of the lake, on the Gati Peninsular. The project was launched in 2006 at the Kigali Serena Hotel (formerly the Intercontinental Hotel), and was anticipated to be constructed in three phases. If completed as announced, the resort will occupy a site 250 acres (1.0 km^{2}) acres in area and will feature 52 housing units, a golf course and a country resort. The contract for the first phase was awarded in June 2007, with a value of over US$26.6 million and estimated construction time of 18 months. As of 2010, however, there is no evidence that work has begun and the project appears to be on hold or cancelled.

Around 2014, the Rwanda housing authority (RHA) completed the land control study and the elaboration of the town planning development project of the shores of lake Muhazi. The main objective of the study was to identify the sectors of the northern and eastern shores of lake Muhazi which are subjected to land pressure so as to establish protection belts and safeguard them. Within this context the study furthermore aimed at establishing a town planning master plan to ensure better organisation of the site's space and a rational and sustainable occupation of the shores of lake Muhazi.

== Notes and references ==
Cited texts

- Briggs, Philip; Booth, Janice (2006). Rwanda: the bradt travel guide. London: Bradt Travel Guides. ISBN 1-84162-180-3.
- Chrétien, Jean-Pierre (2003) The Great Lakes of Africa: Two Thousand Years of History Hardcover ed. Cambridge, MA: MIT Press. ISBN 1-890951-34-X
- Claassen, Marcell (September 2009) Eastern Rwanda birding report Rwanda Travel News Bradt Guides (Philip Briggs). Accessed 5 March 2010.
- Dorsey, Learthen (1994) Historical Dictionary of Rwanda. Scarecrow Press. ISBN 0-8108-2820-0
- Dusabe, Caroline (7 March 2009). "The Thrills At Lake Muhazi, Jambo Beach". East African Business Week (Kampala). Accessed 23 February 2010.
- "Distance from Kigali to Lake Muhazi" (Map). Google Maps.
- Karibu Rwanda Directory Lake Muhazi Golf & Country Resort and Boulevard Archived 2018-08-22 at the Wayback Machine. Accessed 3 March 2010.
- Karibwije, Daniel (4 June 2007). "Rwanda's Housing Gets Boost". East African Business Week (Kampala). Accessed 3 March 2010.
- Lejeune, A.; Frank, V. (1990). "Distribution of Lutra maculicollis in Rwanda: Ecological constraints". IUCN Otter Spec. Group Bull. 5: 8–16.
- Majyambere, Gertrude (9 June 2009). "Country to Cut on Overseas Dependency on Fish Consumption". The New Times (Kigali). Accessed 23 February 2010.
- Makower, Katharine (1999) The Coming of the Rain p56. Paternoster Press. ISBN 0-85364-968-5
- Ministry of Finance and Economic Planning (MINECOFIN), Republic of Rwanda (April 2004) Rwanda: poverty reduction strategy paper : annual progress report. Accessed 23 February 2010.
- Mukankomeje, R.; Plisnier, P-D.; Descy, J-P; & Massaut, L. (1993) Lake Muzahi, Rwanda: limnological features and phytoplankton production Hydrobiologia (Springer Netherlands) 257 (2): 107 - 120
- Muliisa, Richard & Mutesi, Florence (19 November 2006). "U.S.$70m Resort Project At Muhazi". The New Times (Kigali). Accessed 3 March 2010.
- Munyakazi, Augustine & Ntagaramba, Johnson Funga (2005). Atlas of Rwanda French ed. Oxford: Macmillan Education. ISBN 0-333-95451-3
- Mwesigye, Edward (22 January 2008). "Contaminated as it was, lake Muhazi save me – survivor". The New Times (Kigali). Accessed 4 March 2010.
- National Institute of Statistics of Rwanda (NISR). Kigali City; Northern Province; Eastern Province. Accessed 8 March 2010.
- Njoroge, Timothy (29 March 2008). "Exploring the Nyabarongo river Archived 2011-07-27 at the Wayback Machine". The New Times (Kigali). Article also linked here. Accessed 16 February 2010.
- Plisnier Pierre-Denis 1990 Etude hydrobiologique et développement de la pêche au lac Muhazi (bassin de l'Akagera, Rwanda). Rapport final CECODEL-UNECED-AGCD : 179 p
- Plisnier P-D. 1990. Ecologie comparée et exploitation rationnelle de deux populations d' Haplochromis spp (Teleostei, Cichlidae) des lacs Ihema et Muhazi (Rwanda). Thèse de doctorat UCL, Louvain-la-Neuve, Belgique: 328 p
- Prunier, Gérard (1995) The Rwanda crisis, 1959-1994: history of a genocide Hardcover ed. London: C. Hurst & Co. Publishers. ISBN 1-85065-243-0
- Rwanda Environment Management Authority (REMA) Chap V. Biodiversity and genetic resources Rwanda State of Environment Report. Accessed 23 February 2010.
- Tack, L.; Wingate, M.T.D.; De Waele, B.; Meert, J.; Belousova, E.; Griffin, B.; Tahon, A.; Fernandez-Alonso, M. (2008). "The 1375 Ma "Kibaran Event" in Central Africa: prominent emplacement of bimodal magmatism under extensional regime" (PDF). Precambrian Research. 180 (1–2): 63–84. doi:10.1016/j.precamres.2010.02.022.
- United Nations Department of Field Support, Cartographic Section (June 2008) Rwanda Map No. 3717 Rev. 10
- Usanzineza, D.; Nhapi, I.; Gashagaza, J.B.; & Kashaigili, J.J. Heavy metal pollution and nutrient levels in Lake Muhazi, Rwanda. National University of Rwanda / UNESCO-IHE.
- "Kigali". BBC Weather.
- "Background Note: Rwanda". Department of State. 2012.
- King, David C. (2007). Rwanda (Cultures of the World). New York, N.Y.: Benchmark Books. ISBN 978-0-7614-2333-1.
