= Kabarore =

- Town and sector
- Location in Rwanda
- Coordinates: 01°37′16″S 30°23′06″E
- Country: Rwanda
- Province: Eastern Rwanda
- District: Gatsibo District

Area
  - Town and sector: 210.3 km^{2} (81.2 sq mi)
- Elevation: 1,540 m (5,050 ft)

Population (2022 census)
  - Town and sector: 71,769
  - Density: 341.3/km^{2} (883.9/sq mi)
  - Urban: 15,290

Kabarore is a town and sector in Rwanda. It is the headquarters of Gatsibo District.

== Location ==
Kabarore is located in Gatsibo District, Eastern Province, at the western edge of Akagera National Park, about 60 kilometres (37 mi), west of the International border with the Republic of Tanzania. Its location lies about 43 kilometres (27 mi), by road, north of Kayonza, on the Kayonza-Nyagatare Road. The coordinates of the town are:1° 37' 15.60"S, 30° 23' 6.00"E (Latitude:-1.6210; Longitude:30.3850).

== Population ==
The exact population of Kabarore sector is 71,769.

== Points of interest ==
The points of interest within the town limits or close to the edges of town include:

- The headquarters of Gatsibo District
- Offices of Kabarore Town Council
- Kabarore Central Market
- Kabarore Health Center
- A branch of the Bank of Kigali

== See also ==
- Gatsibo District
- Eastern Province, Rwanda
- Bank of Kigali
- Akagera National Park
