= Umutara Province =

Former province of Rwanda

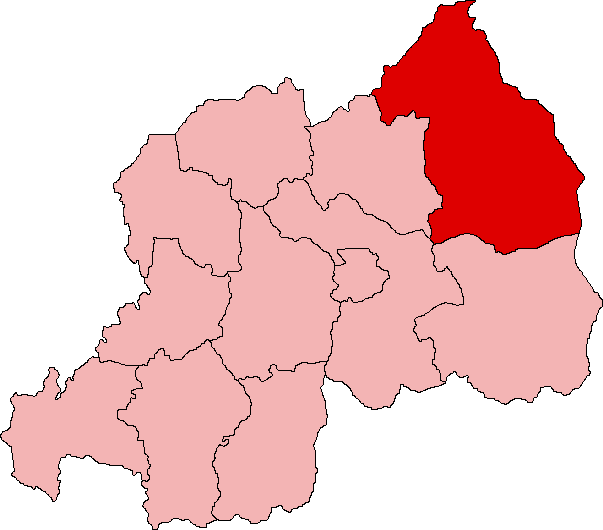
Map showing the former Umutara Province in Rwanda

Until January 2006, Umutara Province was one of the 12 provinces (intara) of Rwanda. However, due to local government reorganization, this area is now part of the new larger Eastern Province.

The old province was situated in the north-east of the country, bordering Uganda to the north and Tanzania to the east. Within Rwanda it borders Kibungo to the south and Byumba to the west. The province was made up of 8 districts and 81 Sectors, with its capital at Nyagatare.

Umutara was formed as a prefecture in 1996 from parts of Byumba and Kibungo.

Umutara had an area of 4,250 square kilometers, most of which is grasslands. The population in 2005 was 421,600.

== See also ==
- Umutara Polytechnic
