= Gatore =

Coordinates: 02°19′55″S 30°34′26″E

- Sector
- Location in Rwanda
- Country: Rwanda
- Province: Eastern Province
- District: Kirehe District

Area
  - Total: 64.0 km^{2} (24.7 sq mi)
- Elevation: 1,460 m (4,790 ft)

Population (2022 census)
  - Total: 31,687
  - Density: 495/km^{2} (1,280/sq mi)

Location of Gatore (red) within Kirehe district

Gatore is one of the 12 sectors in Kirehe district in Eastern Province in Rwanda.

== Geography ==
Gatore covers an area of 64.0 km^{2} and lies at an altitude of about 1,460 m. The sector is divided into six cells: Curazo, Cyunuzu, Muganza, Nyamiryango, Rwabutazi and Rwantonde. It borders Kirehe to the northeast, Musaza to the east, Gahara to the southwest, Mutenderi to the west and Murama to the northwest.

== Demographics ==
The population was 31,687 at the census of 2022. Ten years earlier, it had been 26,923, which corresponds to an annual population increase of 1.6 percent between 2012 and 2022.

== Transport ==
National Road 4 runs through the north of the sector in an east–west direction.
