= Augustin Bizimana =

Rwandan politician

- Born: c. 1954; Byumba Province, Rwanda-Burundi
- Died: August 2000 (aged 45–46); Pointe-Noire, Republic of the Congo
- Body discovered: May 2020
- Known for: Alleged perpetrator in the Rwandan genocide
- Status: Died before trial
- Criminal charges: 1 count of genocide; 1 count of complicity in genocide; 6 counts of crimes against humanity (1 for extermination, 1 for murder, 1 for rape, 1 for torture, 1 for other inhumane acts, and 1 for persecution); 5 counts of Violations of Common Article 3 and Additional Protocol II

Augustin Bizimana (1954 – August 2000) was a Rwandan politician who was wanted for his alleged role in the Rwandan genocide.

Born in Gituza commune, Byumba Province, Rwanda, of Hutu ethnicity, Bizimana held the position of Minister of Defence in the government of Juvénal Habyarimana formed on 18 July 1993.

After Habyarimana's assassination, Bizimana became the Minister of Defence in the interim government until mid-July 1994. Among his powers were control over the possession of weapons by the civilian population, and control over the Rwandan Armed Forces (FAR), the government's army.

Bizimana was charged with 13 counts of genocide, complicity in genocide, extermination, murder, rape, torture, other inhumane acts, persecution, cruel treatment and outrages upon personal dignity in connection with the Rwandan genocide. Among other crimes, he was alleged to be responsible for the murders of Prime Minister Agathe Uwilingiyimana, 10 Belgian United Nations peacekeepers, and Tutsi civilians. Bizimana was believed to be a fugitive until May 2020, when DNA tests showed that human remains from a grave site in Pointe-Noire in the Republic of the Congo belonged to Bizimana. He was believed to have died in Pointe-Noire in August 2000.

The Bizimana death constitutes a "great disappointment" for the survivors of the genocide, reacted Alain Gauthier, head of an association of victims of genocides in France.

== See also ==
- Augustin Bizimungu

Preceded by James Gasana	Minister of Defence (Rwanda); 18 July 1993 – 18 July 1994	Succeeded by Paul Kagame
