= National Science and Technology Council (disambiguation) =

The National Science and Technology Council is a council in the federal government's executive branch of the United States.

National Science and Technology Council may also refer to:

- National Science and Technology Council (Taiwan), an agency of the Executive Yuan in Taiwan
- National Science and Technology Council, a section of the Office of the Chief Scientist of the Government of Australia
- National Council for Science and Technology, a national council of the Government of Bangladesh
- National Council for Science and Technology Communication, a scientific program of the Government of India
- National Council for Scientific and Technological Development, a government agency of the Government of Brazil
- National Scientific and Technical Research Council, a government agency of the Government of Argentina
- Council for Science and Technology, an advisory body of the Government of United Kingdom
- Science and Technology Facilities Council, a government agency of the Government of the United Kingdom
