= Commune of Kabarore =

Coordinates: 2°48′47″S 29°29′18″E

- Commune
- Interactive map of Commune of Kabarore
- Country: Burundi
- Province: Kayanza Province
- Administrative center: Kabarore
- Time zone: UTC+2 (Central Africa Time)

The commune of Kabarore is a commune of Kayanza Province in northern Burundi. The capital lies at Kabarore. In 2007, DGHER electrified three rural villages in the commune.
