= Kigarama =

Sector of Rwanda in the district of Kirehe

Kigarama is a sector (imirenge) of the Rwandan district of Kirehe in Eastern Province, with a population of 37,136 (2022 census) and an area of 115.7 square kilometers.
