= Mwiri =

- Sector
- Location in Rwanda
- Coordinates: 01°50′13.2″S 30°42′46.8″E
- Country: Rwanda
- Province: Eastern Province
- District: Kayonza District

Area
  - Sector: 514.8 km^{2} (198.8 sq mi)
- Elevation: 1,570 m (5,150 ft)

Population (2022 census)
  - Sector: 37,931
  - Density: 73.68/km^{2} (190.8/sq mi)
  - Rural: 37,931

Location of Mwiri (red) within Kayonza district (gray)

Mwiri (Kinyarwanda Umurenge wa Mwiri) is one of the 12 sectors in Kayonza District in the Eastern Province, Rwanda

== Geography ==
Mwiri covers an area of 514.8 km^{2} and lies at an altitude of about 1,570 m. The sector is divided into four cells: Kageyo, Migera, Nyamugari and Nyawera. It borders Murundi to the north, Ndego to the southeast, Kabare to the south, Rwinkwavu and Nyamirama to the south-east, Mukarange to the west and Gahini to the northwest. In the east, the sector borders the Kagera Nile, which roughly forms the border with Tanzania. The eastern half of Mwiri is part of the Akagera National Park. Ihema Lake is located in this area. Other smaller lakes in the sector include, from north to south, Murambya, Murambi, Birengero and Shakani Lakes.

== Demographics ==
The census in 2022 put the population at 37,931. Ten years earlier, it was 22,933, which corresponds to an annual population increase of 5.2 percent between 2012 and 2022.

== Transport ==
The National Road 25 runs through the sector in a north–south direction.
