= Cyarubare District =

District in Eastern, Rwanda

Cyarubare is a district (akarere) of the Eastern Province of Rwanda (it was formerly in Kibungo Province). Its population in 2002 was 67,184 and it is 405 km (252 miles) in area.
