= Jean Paul Bujyacyera =

Rwandan media personality

Bujyacyera Jean Paul also known as Gutermann Guter (born December 27, 1989 in Gatsibo) is a Rwandan activist, journalist and founder of organization called Nufashwa Yafasha.

== Early life and education ==
Bujyacyera Jean Paul was born in Ngarama, Gatsibo District in the Eastern part of Rwanda on December 27, 1989.

He obtained bachelor's degree in journalism at the University of Rwanda in the fall of 2015.

== Philanthropy ==
Bujyacyera Jean Paul launched the Nufashwa Yafasha Organization, a non-profit organization that provides education, healthcare to children and families in need. The organization was founded in 2014 and has since helped over 5000 people.
