= Remera =

- Village and sector
- Location within Rwanda
- Coordinates: 2.08527°S 30.55748°E
- Country: Rwanda
- Province: Eastern Province
- District: Ngoma District

Area
  - Village and sector: 50.42 km^{2} (19.47 sq mi)

Population (2022 census)
  - Village and sector: 32,344
  - Density: 641.5/km^{2} (1,661/sq mi)
  - Urban: 5,500

Remera is a village and sector in Ngoma District, Eastern Province in Rwanda, with a population of 32,344 (2022 census) and an area of 50.42 square kilometers.
