= List of provinces of Rwanda by Human Development Index =

This is a list of provinces of Rwanda by Human Development Index as of 2025 with data for the year 2023.

Rank	Province	HDI (2023)
Medium human development
1	City of Kigali	0.671
–	Rwanda (average)	0.578
2	Eastern	0.570
3	Western	0.565
4	Southern	0.556
5	Northern	0.555

== See also ==
- List of countries by Human Development Index
