= Ndego =

Coordinates: 01°59′24″S 30°44′38.4″E

- Sector and town
- Location in Rwanda
- Country: Rwanda
- Province: Eastern Province
- District: Kayonza District

Area
  - Total: 177.1 km^{2} (68.4 sq mi)
- Elevation: 1,380 m (4,530 ft)

Population (2022 census)
  - Total: 24,389
  - Density: 137.7/km^{2} (356.7/sq mi)

Location of Ndego (red) within Kayonza district

Ndego (Kinyarwanda: Umurenge wa Ndego) is one of the 12 sectors in Kayonza District in the Eastern Province of Rwanda.

== Geography ==
Ndego covers an area of 177.1 km^{2} and lies at an altitude of about 1,380 m. The sector is divided into four cells: Byimana, Isangano, Karambi and Kiyovu. It borders the neighboring sectors of Mwiri to the north, Mpanga to the southeast, Nasho to the south and Kabare to the west. To the east, the sector borders the Kagera Nile, which roughly forms the border with Tanzania. The northern part of the sector is part of the Akagera National Park and is located on Lake Ihema. Lake Rwakibali is located in the east and Lake Nasho and the northern shore of Lake Cyambwe are located in the south.

== Demographics ==
The population was 24,389 at the census of 2022. Ten years earlier, it was 18,918, which corresponds to an annual population increase of 2.6 percent between 2012 and 2022.

== Transport ==
A district road runs through the sector, coming from National Road 25 and heading northeast to Lake Rwakibali.
