= Kibungo Municipality =

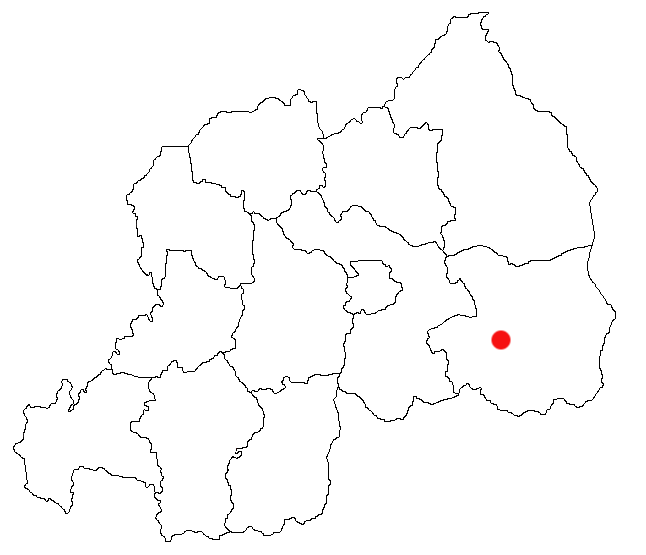
Location of Kibungo in Rwanda

Kibungo Municipality was a municipality (Kinyarwanda: umujyi) within the Rwandan Kibungo Province (now part of Eastern Province).

Population: 43,582 (2002 figures); area: 97 square kilometers.
