= Rukira District =

Sector in Ngoma District, Rwanda

- Country: Rwanda
- Provinces: Districts
- Eastern Province: Ngoma

Area
  - Total: 68.55 km^{2} (26.47 sq mi)
- Elevation: 1,622 m (5,322 ft)

Population
  - Total: 29,893
  - Density: 436/km^{2} (1,130/sq mi)
- Time zone: UTC+2

Rukira is a sector (imirenge), in Ngoma District, Eastern Province in Rwanda, with an area of 68.55 square kilometers.

== Demographics ==
In 2012, the sectors population was 25,250 inhabitants, and had a gender ratio of 12,065 males to 13,185 females.

According to the 2022 census, the sector had a total population of 29,893 inhabitants, with the following Gender demographics:

- Males 14,301
- Females 15,592

The Rwanda Environment Management Authority hypothesised that the high male-to-female ratio was due to a tendency for men to migrate to the city in search of work outside the agricultural sector, while their wives remained in a rural home.

As of 2022 it had a 90.5% rural rate and a 9.5% Urban rate. It is quite young with 38.5% of the population is under 15 and 56.7% of the population being younger than 65, and older than 14. Only 4.8% of the population is older than 64.
