= Mirenge District =

Mirenge is a former district (akarere) of the Rwandan province of Kibungo. The district, along with the province, was abolished as part of a reorganisation of local government in 2006. Population: 101,026 (2002 figures); area: 419 square kilometers.
