= Ngoma District =

Coordinates: 2°11′S 30°28′E

- District
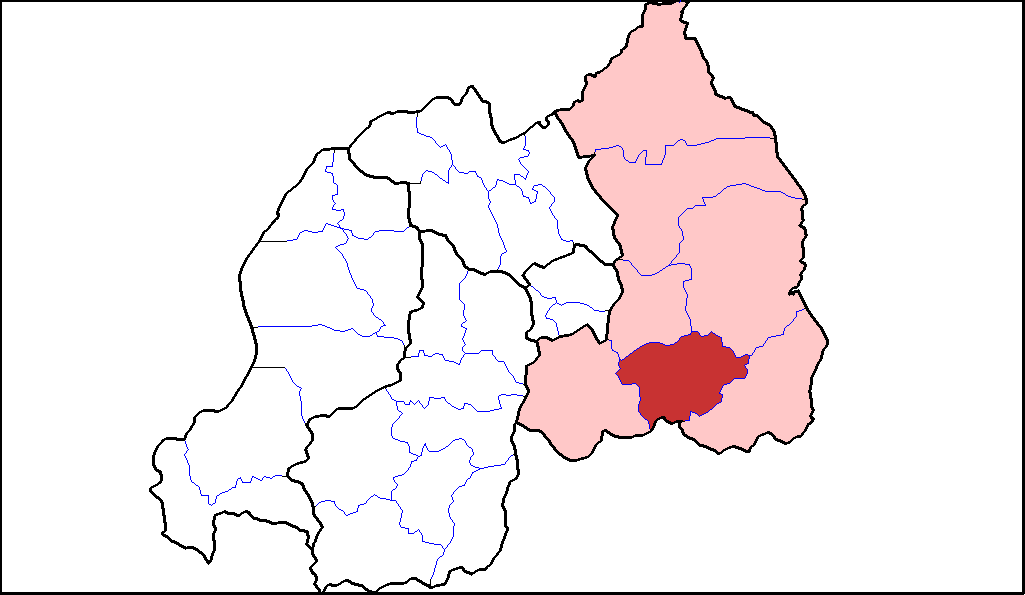
- Shown within Eastern Province and Rwanda
- Country: Rwanda
- Province: Eastern
- Capital: Kibungo

Area
  - District: 861 km^{2} (332 sq mi)

Population (2022 census)
  - District: 404,048
  - Density: 469/km^{2} (1,220/sq mi)
  - Urban: 37,297

Ngoma Sector in northern province

Ngoma is a district (akarere) in Eastern Province, Rwanda. Its capital is Kibungo.

== Sectors ==
Ngoma district is divided into 14 sectors (imirenge): Gashanda, Jarama, Karembo, Kazo, Kibungo, Mugesera, Murama, Mutenderi, Remera, Rukira, Rukumberi, Rurenge, Sake and Zaza.
