= Rwamagana District =

Coordinates: 1°58′S 30°21′E

- District
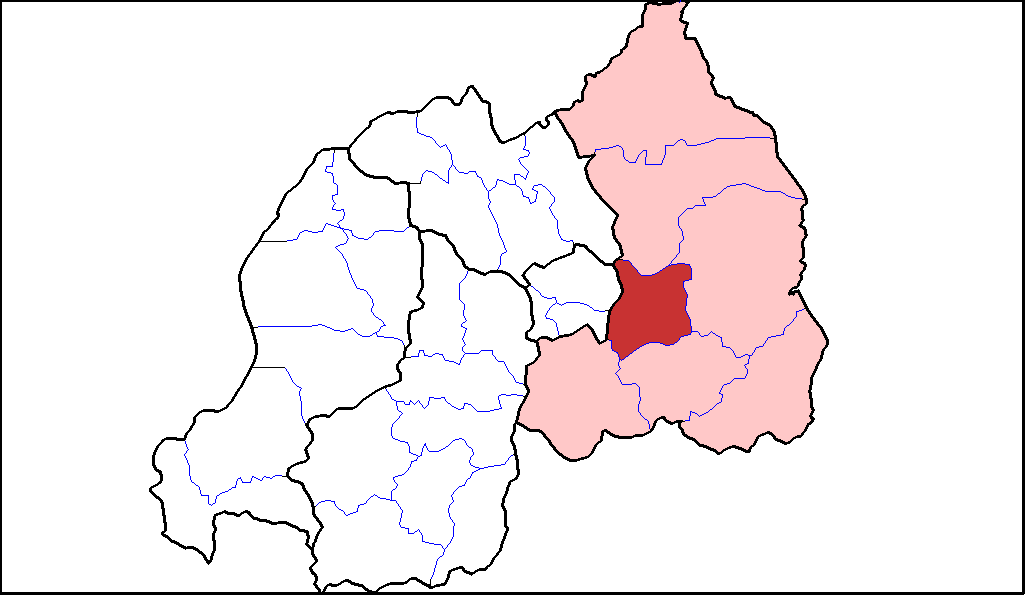
- Shown within Eastern Province and Rwanda
- Country: Rwanda
- Province: Eastern
- Capital: Rwamagana

Area
  - Total: 682 km^{2} (263 sq mi)

Population (2022 census)
  - Total: 484,953
  - Density: 711/km^{2} (1,840/sq mi)

Rwamagana is a district (akarere) in Eastern Province, Rwanda. Its capital is Rwamagana city, which is also the provincial capital. The Mayor is MBONYUMUVUNYI Radjab. Rwamagana has 14 sectors which are Gishali, Gahengeri,Fumbwe, mwurire, Karenge, Kigabiro, Gahengeri,Musha,Munyiginya, Muhazi, Munyaga, Nyakaliro, Nzige and Rubona. It is found in eastern province of Rwanda. In Rwamagana there many infrastructures such as the biggest Solar power plant in Africa located in Rubona sector, Rwanda politechnic (IPRC Gishari), University of UNLAK Rwamagana branch, Rwamagana Hospital and other private Clinics, Rwanda National Police training school,Lakes like Mugesera and Lake Muhazi, Rwamagana Market, Expoground area and Dereva hotel.

== Sectors ==
Rwamagana district is divided into 14 sectors (imirenge): Fumbwe, Gahengeri, Gishali, Karenge, Kigabiro, Muhazi, Muhazi, Munyaga, Munyiginya, Musha, Muyumbu, Mwulire, Nyakariro, Nzige and Rubona.

Rwamagana is 'a place of hundred's thing' in Kinyarwanda, as it contains the word 'amagana' a word that mean 'hundreds' in many bantu dialects. The district's name 'Rwamagana' was meant to imply a place of abundance and prosperity.

Rwamagana has Rwamagana industrial zone with 33 different industries located in Mwulire and Munyiginya sector. It has 5 modern markets: Rwamagana modern market, Ntunga Market, Nyagasambu market, Karenge market and Rubona market and other small market and selling points such as Cyili market (for Fruit and vegetable selling) Nzige, Kabuga ka Musha, and Gishore/ Nyakaliro market. Rwamagana has been the root of best Football team in history i.e Rwamagana city FC, Muhazi united FC, Sunrise FC and Police Rwanda FC. In Cultural activities Rwamagana has Traditional dancing group like Garukurebe and Imanzi. 4. Food

Famous Rwamagana dishes include:

Dish Ugali: Staple maize meal, eaten with stew. Nyama Choma and Blochette: Grilled meat, often goat or beef. Pilau: Spiced rice dish with rich aroma. Chapati: Soft flatbread.
