= Manasse Mbonye =

Rwandan theoretical physicist

- Education: University of Connecticut
- Known for: Mbonye-Kazanas model
- Scientific career
- Fields: Astronomy, astrophysics

Manasse Mbonye is a theoretical astrophysicist born in Gahini, Rwanda. He is currently Executive Secretary of the National Council for Science and Technology in Kigali.

== Early life and education ==
Mbonye's parents (Reuben Rwabuzisoni, father) were teachers. His high school education was at Nyakasura School in Uganda. He attended Fourah Bay College in Sierra Leone, then obtained his doctoral degree from the University of Connecticut in 1996. His Ph.D. dissertation on "Gravitational Perturbations of Radiating Spacetimes" along with his founding of and activities in the "Rwanda Education Reconstruction Effort" (RERE) earned him the 1996 Ph.D. "Graduate of the Year" at the University of Connecticut.

== Research ==
Mbonye held a postdoctoral position at the University of Michigan and was a professor at the Rochester Institute of Technology until 2011. He also carried out research at the NASA Goddard Space Flight Center in Greenbelt, Maryland as a National Research Council Senior Research Associate.

Mbonye has made important contributions to theoretical physics, including the Mbonye-Kazanas model of non-singular black holes, cosmology with interacting dark energy, and models for the origin of the M–sigma relation.

Mbonye is currently Vice-Rector in Charge of Academic Affairs at the National University of Rwanda, and RIT-NUR Research Professor at the Rochester Institute of Technology.
