= National Council for Science and Technology =

Council of Bangladesh government based on Science and Technology

- Formation: 1983
- Headquarters: Dhaka, Bangladesh
- Region served: Bangladesh
- Official language: Bengali

The National Council for Science and Technology (Bengali: বিজ্ঞান ও প্রযুক্তি জাতীয় কাউন্সিল) is a national council of the Bangladesh government responsible for developing policies concerning science and technology. It develops and manages science and technology research facilities. It is headed by the prime minister.

== History ==
The National Council for Science and Technology was established on 16 May 1983 as the National Committee for Science and Technology. The council is headed by the prime minister of Bangladesh. It is managed by the executive committee of the National Council for Science and Technology.

== See also ==
- Manasse Mbonye
