= Kigali-Rural Province =

Former province in Rwanda

Kigali-Rural Province Kinyarwanda: Kigali-Ngali
- Province
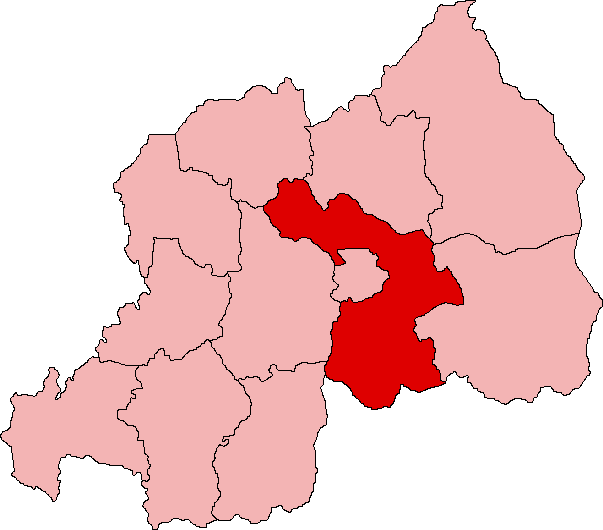
- Kigali-Rural's location in Rwanda
- Interactive map of Kigali-Rural Province
- Coordinates: 1°56′26.81″S 30°17′53.62″E
- Country: Rwanda
- Time zone: UTC+2:00 (CAT)

Kigali-Rural Province, known in Kinyarwanda as Kigali-Ngali, was a province surrounding the city of Kigali, Rwanda. It was abolished in 2006, along with other existing provinces at the time, in favour of a system of redrawn provinces.

== See also ==
- Provinces of Rwanda
