= Gahini =

- Sector and village
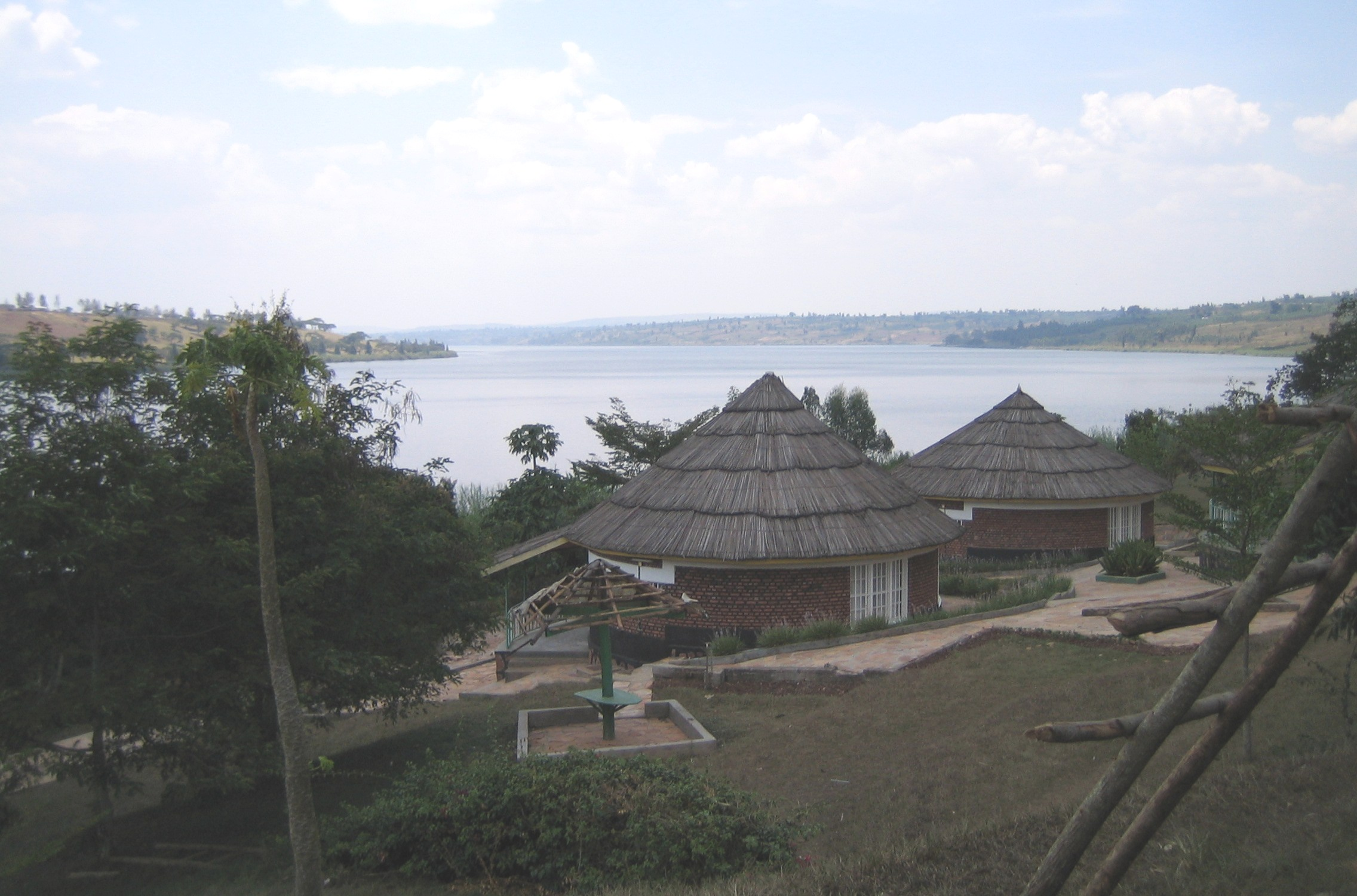
- The Seeds Of Peace centre at Lake Muhazi

- Location in Rwanda
- Coordinates: 1.84252°S 30.48235°E
- Country: Rwanda
- Province: Eastern Province
- District: Kayonza

Area
  - Sector and village: 201.7 km^{2} (77.9 sq mi)
- Elevation: 1,520 m (4,990 ft)

Population (2022 census)
  - Sector and village: 46,009
  - Density: 228.1/km^{2} (590.8/sq mi)
  - Urban: 7,917
- Time zone: UTC+2 (CAT)
  - Summer (DST): UTC+2 (not observed)

Gahini is a sector and village in Kayonza District, Eastern Province, Rwanda. It is situated on a hill, at an altitude of 1,520 metres (4,990 ft) above sea-level, close to the eastern edge of Lake Muhazi and 73 kilometres (45 mi) by road from the capital, Kigali. The village is the centre of one of the nine dioceses of the Eglise Episcopale au Rwanda, the Anglican church of Rwanda, and one of the four Rwandan sites chosen by the Church Missionary Society, who built a large mission, hospital and schools in the village.

== History ==
Little is known of Gahini in pre-colonial times, but under German and Belgian rule the village became an important transport junction linking the lake with the north–south and eastbound roads. From 1922 the area was temporarily under British control as part of the surveying process for the proposed Cape-Cairo railway, which enabled Doctors Leonard Sharp and Zoe Stanley Smith of the Church Missionary Society, to start missionary and medical work across eastern Ruanda. This land was returned to Belgium in 1924 but the rulers allowed the Church Missionary Society to continue its work, which meant a permanent mission could then be set up. Geoffrey Holmes, a good friend of the Rwandan King Musinga, was in charge of this enterprise and he chose Gahini to be the site. He was joined by Rev Herbert Jackson and Kosiya Shalita, a native of Gahini who had fled to Uganda 30 years earlier, become a Christian, and now wished to return home.

== Economy and tourism ==
Gahini hospital, established by John Edward Church of the Church Missionary Society, is one of the largest in the Eastern Province with facilities including maternity, orthopaedic surgery, HIV treatment, a rehabilitation centre for persons with physical disabilities and an eye clinic used by patients from across Rwanda. There is a cell called video center which is most popular and most economical activities are done there. The Muhazi lake shore at Gahini is popular with tourists and features two resorts: the Seeds of Peace centre, which offers accommodation, and Jambo Beach. These are used both as stop off points for journeys to or from Akagera National Park, and as venues for lake tourism, offering boating, fishing and bird watching.

== Notable people ==
- Innocent Himbaza, theologian and Hebraist
- Manasse Mbonye, astrophysicist

== See also ==
- Anglican Diocese of Gahini
