= Kayonza District =

Coordinates: 1°51′S 30°39′E

- District
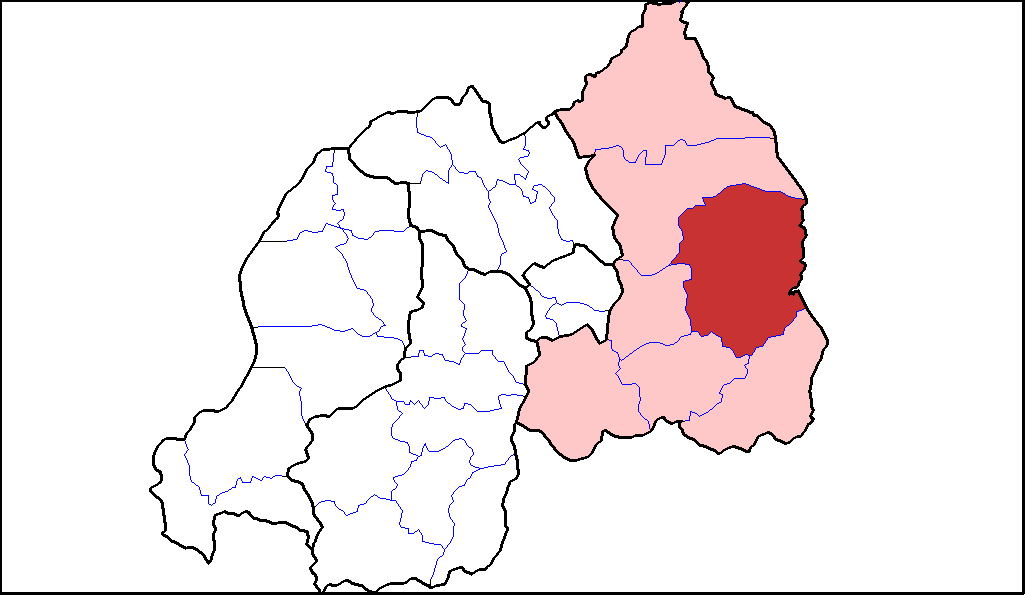
- Shown within Eastern Province and Rwanda
- Country: Rwanda
- Province: Eastern
- Capital: Mukarange

Area
  - District: 1,937 km^{2} (748 sq mi)

Population (2022 census)
  - District: 457,156
  - Density: 236.0/km^{2} (611.3/sq mi)
  - Urban: 65,071

Kayonza is a district (akarere) located in Eastern Province, Rwanda. Its capital is Mukarange.The population of Kayonza District is projected to 457,156 people in 2022, living in 12 sectors (imirenge): Gahini, Kabare, Kabarondo, Mukarange, Murama, Murundi, Mwiri, Ndego, Nyamirama, Rukara, Ruramira and Rwinkwavu., and 50 cells and 421 Villages (Imidugudu).

== Akagera National Park ==
Kayonza is the home of Akagera National Park, a popular tourist destination for safaris. Since the import of seven lions in 2015, from the Phinda Game Reserve and Tembe Elephant Park, in South Africa, Akagera is home to all of the 'Big Five' animals. As of 2019, there are around 25 lions.

== Healthcare Facilities ==
- NARADA MEDICAL CLINIC
- GAHINI HOSPITAL
- RWINKWAVU Hospital
- Health Centers
