= Kirehe District =

Coordinates: 2°15′S 30°44′E

- District
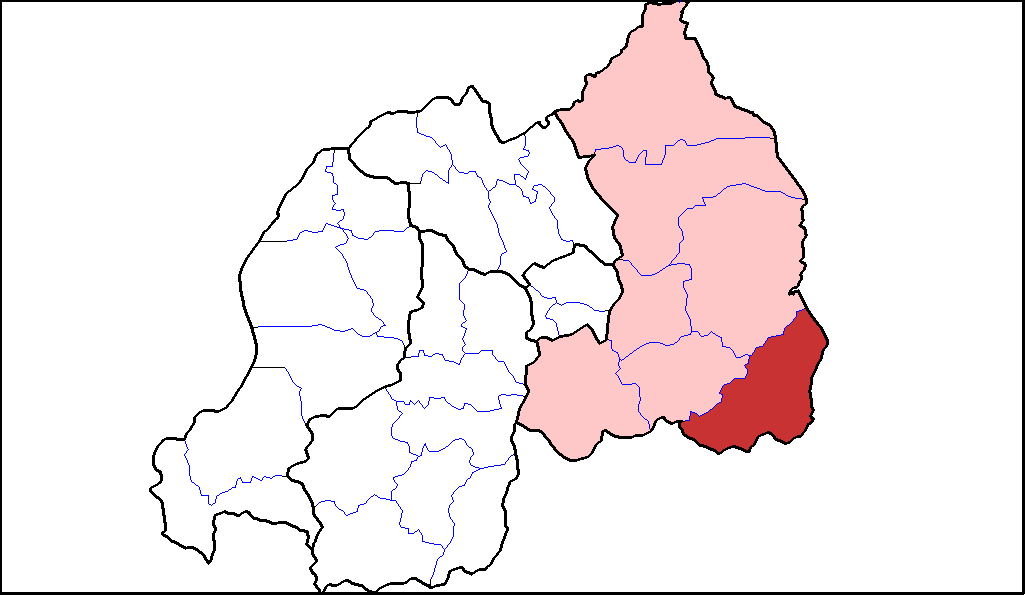
- Shown within Eastern Province and Rwanda
- Country: Rwanda
- Province: Eastern
- Capital: Kirehe

Area
  - Total: 1,176 km^{2} (454 sq mi)

Population (2022 census)
  - Total: 460,860
  - Density: 391.9/km^{2} (1,015/sq mi)

Kirehe is a district (akarere) in Eastern Province, Rwanda. Its capital is Kirehe town (which is usually known as Rusumo, being the major settlement of the former Rusumo district).

== Geography ==
The district comprises areas in the far south-eastern corner of Rwanda, bordering Tanzania and Burundi. Its most noteworthy feature is Rusumo Falls, the waterfall on the Kagera River, which has been key to Rwandan history.

=== Climate ===
The district is characterized by savanna, acacia trees and few natural forests, these and the existence of the Kagera River contributes to a temperate climate in the region.

== Sectors ==
Kirehe district is divided into 12 sectors (imirenge): Gahara, Gatore, Kigarama, Kigina, Kirehe, Mahama, Mpanga, Musaza, Mushikiri, Nasho, Nyamugari and Nyarubuye.

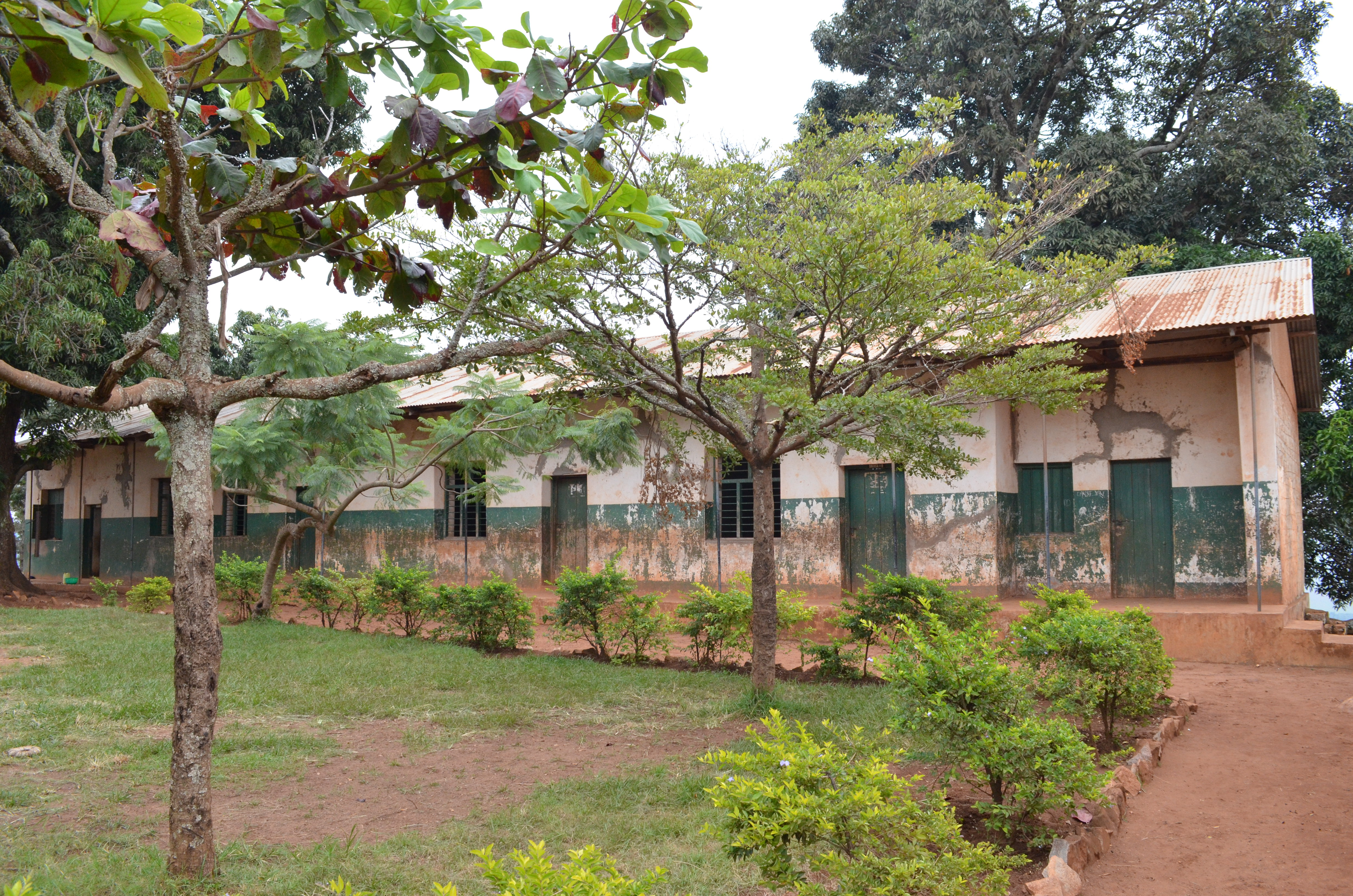
Primary school in Kigarama 2
