= Byumba Province =

Former province of Rwanda

Coordinates: 1.5863°S 30.0627°E

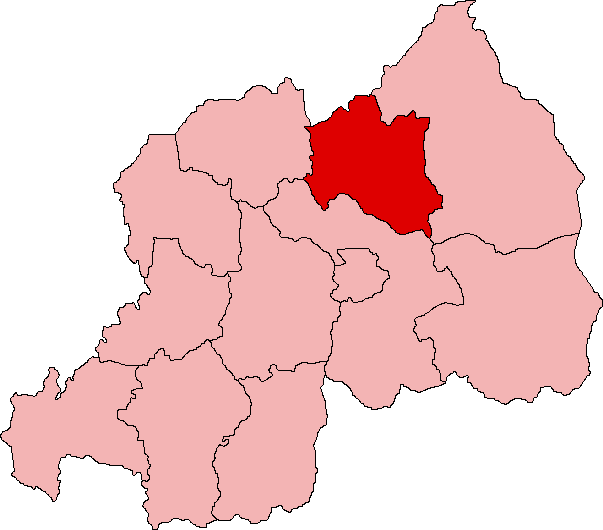
Map showing the former Byumba Province in Rwanda

Byumba Province was one of the 12 former provinces (intara) of Rwanda and was situated in the north of the country, sharing a border with Uganda. It had an area of some 1,796 km^{2} (693 square miles) and its population was estimated at 782,427 (2002 figures) prior to its dissolution in January 2006.
