= Kibungo =

Kibungo City
- Town and sector
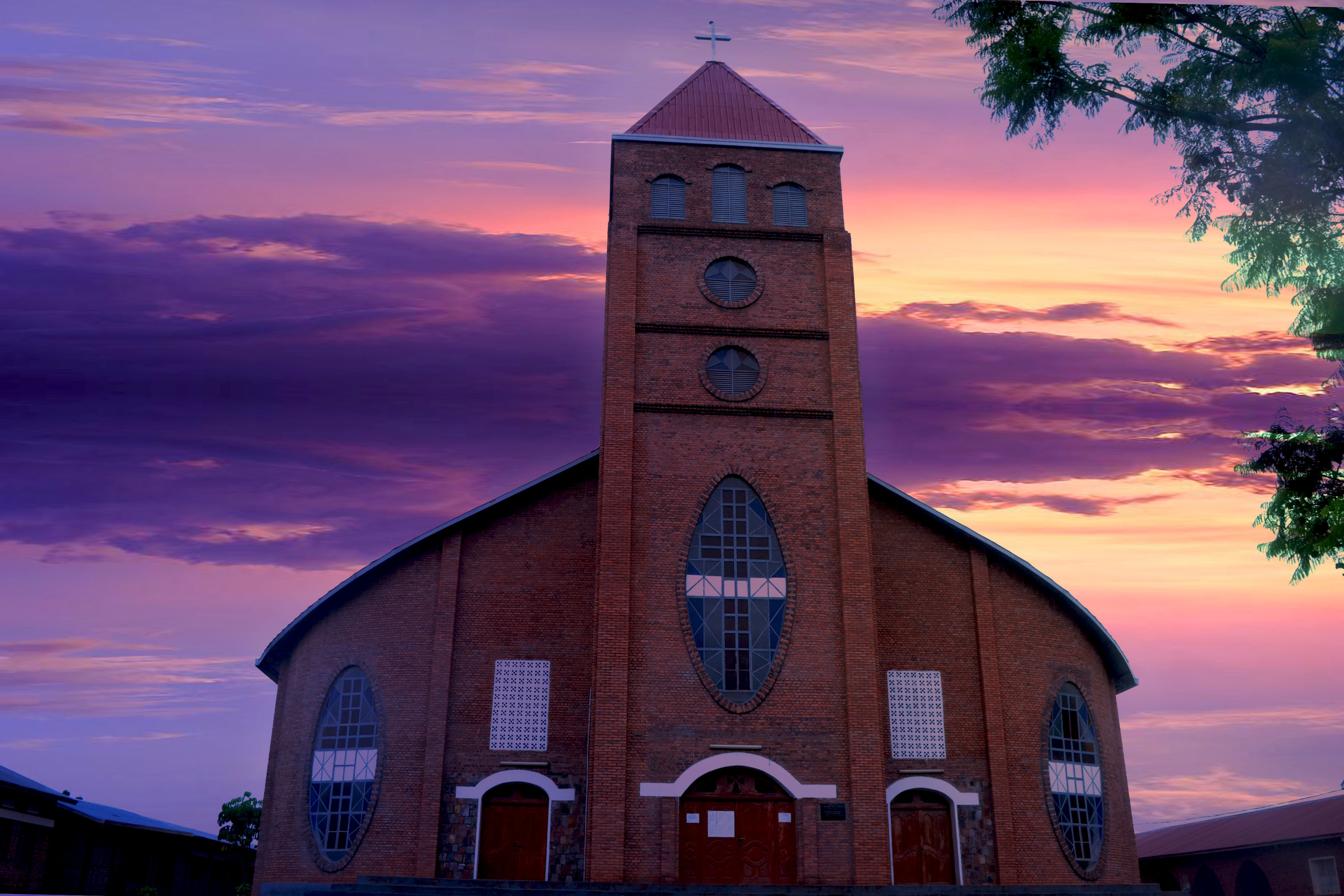
- The Roman Catholic Diocese of Kibungo, one of the oldest churches in Eastern Province

- Location in Rwanda
- Coordinates: 2.14910°S 30.54780°E
- Country: Rwanda
- Province: Eastern Province
- District: Ngoma District

Area
  - Town and sector: 43.37 km^{2} (16.75 sq mi)
- Elevation: 1,820 m (5,970 ft)

Population (2022 census)
  - Town and sector: 31,445
  - Density: 725.0/km^{2} (1,878/sq mi)
  - Urban: 17,087
- Climate: Aw

Kibungo is a town and sector in the Republic of Rwanda. It is the political, administrative and commercial capital of Ngoma District. In 1998, Kibungo became the site of at least four of Rwanda's last 22 executions. All of the convicts were executed for crimes related to the 1994 genocide.

== Location ==
Kibungo is located in Ngoma District, Eastern Province. Its location lies in the southeastern part of Rwanda, along the main road (B3) from Kigali in Rwanda, to Nyakasanza, in Tanzania. Kibungo lies approximately 73 kilometres (45 mi) by road southeast of Kigali, the capital and largest city of Rwanda.

== Climate ==
Climate data for Kibungo (1991–2020)
Month	Jan	Feb	Mar	Apr	May	Jun	Jul	Aug	Sep	Oct	Nov	Dec	Year
Record high °C (°F)	33.8 (92.8)	33.1 (91.6)	31.7 (89.1)	30.6 (87.1)	31.4 (88.5)	30.6 (87.1)	30.1 (86.2)	31.5 (88.7)	32.0 (89.6)	32.3 (90.1)	31.2 (88.2)	33.5 (92.3)	33.8 (92.8)
Mean daily maximum °C (°F)	26.7 (80.1)	26.8 (80.2)	26.2 (79.2)	25.5 (77.9)	25.7 (78.3)	26.6 (79.9)	27.1 (80.8)	27.5 (81.5)	27.7 (81.9)	26.5 (79.7)	25.5 (77.9)	26.1 (79.0)	26.5 (79.7)
Daily mean °C (°F)	20.9 (69.6)	21.0 (69.8)	20.6 (69.1)	20.3 (68.5)	20.4 (68.7)	20.8 (69.4)	21.0 (69.8)	21.4 (70.5)	21.5 (70.7)	20.9 (69.6)	20.2 (68.4)	20.7 (69.3)	20.8 (69.4)
Mean daily minimum °C (°F)	15.1 (59.2)	15.2 (59.4)	15.0 (59.0)	15.0 (59.0)	15.1 (59.2)	15.0 (59.0)	15.0 (59.0)	15.3 (59.5)	15.2 (59.4)	15.2 (59.4)	15.0 (59.0)	15.3 (59.5)	15.1 (59.2)
Record low °C (°F)	9.0 (48.2)	10.4 (50.7)	9.9 (49.8)	9.7 (49.5)	9.6 (49.3)	10.7 (51.3)	9.4 (48.9)	10.2 (50.4)	10.6 (51.1)	10.6 (51.1)	10.9 (51.6)	9.8 (49.6)	9.0 (48.2)
Average precipitation mm (inches)	78.8 (3.10)	97.1 (3.82)	156.1 (6.15)	177.9 (7.00)	127.6 (5.02)	16.6 (0.65)	12.7 (0.50)	42.1 (1.66)	69.0 (2.72)	121.2 (4.77)	197.9 (7.79)	119.7 (4.71)	1,216.8 (47.91)
Average precipitation days (≥ 1.0 mm)	6.7	7.3	10.6	14.7	7.4	1.4	0.7	2.5	5.6	9.1	17.0	10.4	93.4
Source: NOAA

== Population ==
As of the census of 2022, the population of Kibungo Sector was at 31,445.

== Places of interest ==
- The offices of Ngoma District Administration
- The offices of Kibungo City Council
- Kibungo Central Market
- Ngoma Prison
- A branch of Bank of Kigali, the largest commercial bank in the country
- A branch of Urwego Opportunity Bank, a commercial bank
- A branch of Banque Populaire du Rwanda, a commercial bank
- The main campus of the Institute of Agriculture, Technology and Education of Kibungo (INATEK), is located in town
- The Open University of Tanzania maintains an office in Kibungo
- Kibungo Referral Hospital

== See also ==
- Ngoma District
- List of universities in Rwanda
- Eastern Province, Rwanda
