= Rwamagana =

Rwamagana city
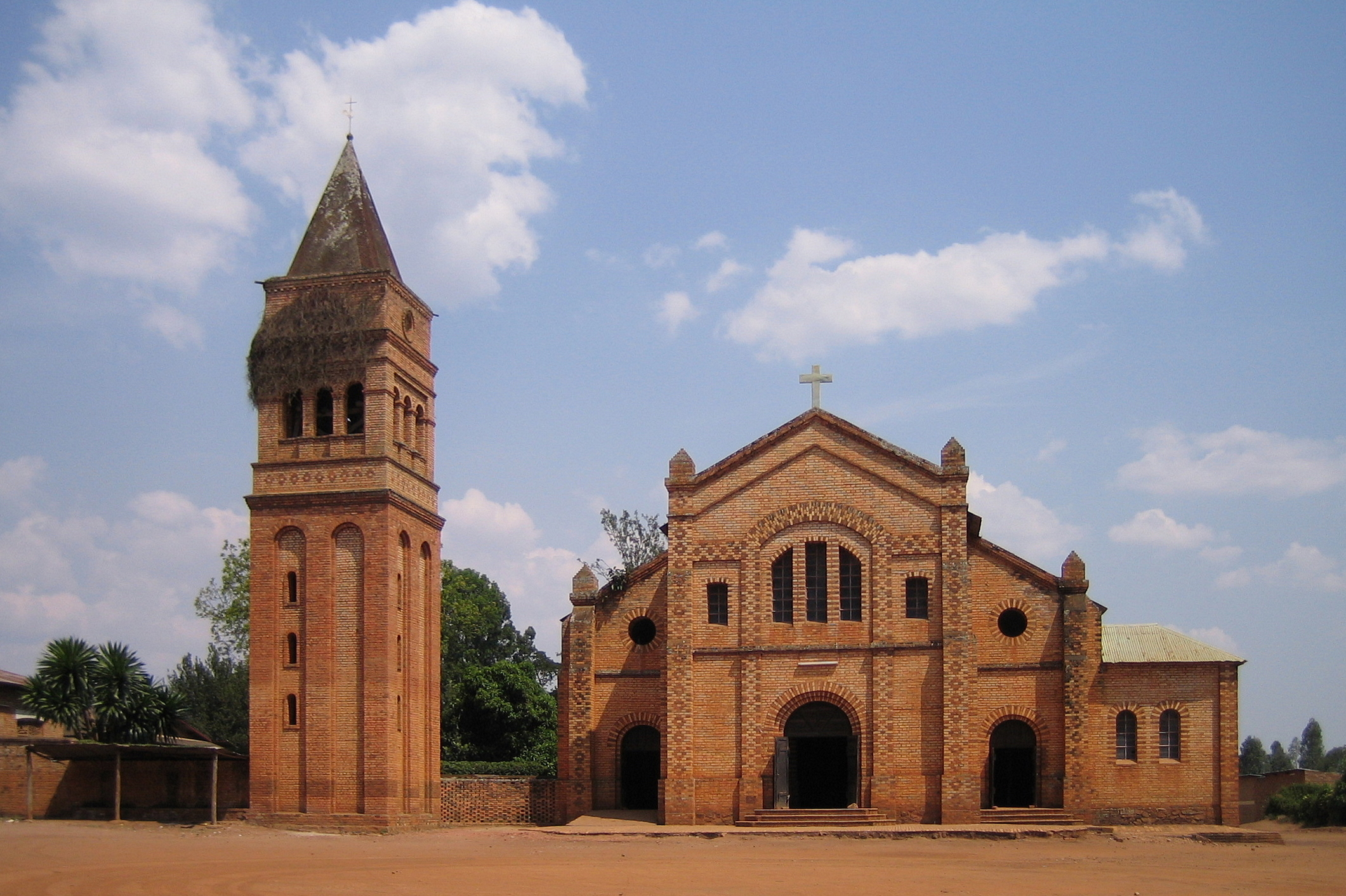
- Rwamagana Parish Church

- Location in Rwanda
- Coordinates: 1°57′09″S 30°26′16″E
- Country: Rwanda
- Admin. Province: Eastern Province
- District: Rwamagana District

Government

Area
  - Total: 87 km^{2} (34 sq mi)
- Elevation: 1,528 m (5,013 ft)

Population (2025)
  - Total: 98,522
  - Density: 1,100/km^{2} (2,900/sq mi)
  - Summer (DST): +2 GMT
- Climate: Aw

Rwamagana is a city and capital of both the Rwamagana District and the Eastern Province in Rwanda

== Description ==
Rwamagana lies approximately 50 km (31 mi) from Kigali, on the newly renovated road leading east towards Tanzania. There was formerly a large amount of traffic running through the centre, particularly freight to and from Tanzania, but with the recent creation of a bypass, the centre of the city is now quieter. The city lies mainly along two roads, the main east–west route, and a spur leading off to the south. The main market and the Banque de Kigali are on this spur, while the city's two petrol stations, taxi-bus parks and post office are on the east–west road. There is a large church at the western end of the city, adjacent to the main secondary school, and a new conference centre at the eastern end of the bypass. Rwamagana district has about 14 sectors including: Kigabiro, Muyumbu, Nyakariro, Karenge, Nzige, Gahengeri, Mwurire, Rubona, Gishari, Munyiginya, Muhazi, Gishari, Mushutu and Munyaga. Four leading commercial centres with modern market and central services in commercial industries are Rwamagana centre, Karenge centre, Nyagasambu centre, Rubona centre. Four coffee washing station in this district include: RWACOF at Karenge, KOPAKABI at Karenge, Muyumbu and Rubona washing stations are the major factory to prepare the coffee in the district.

- Population: 47,203 (2002 figures); area: 87 square kilometers (34 sq mi).

== Gishari sector ==
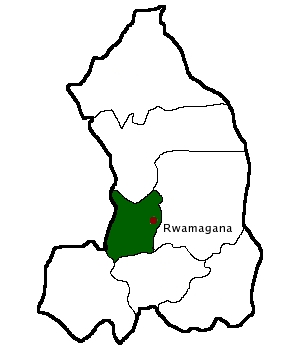
Rwamagana district map

Gishari sector is one of the 14 sectors which constitute Rwamagana and is situated in the Eastern province of Rwanda.
