= Kabarondo, Rwanda =

Kabarondo
- Town and sector
- Location in Rwanda
- Coordinates: 02°00′38″S 30°33′27″E
- Country: Rwanda
- Province: Eastern Province
- District: Kayonza District

Area
  - Town and sector: 54.43 km^{2} (21.02 sq mi)
- Elevation: 1,820 m (5,970 ft)

Population (2022 census)
  - Town and sector: 37,839
  - Density: 695.2/km^{2} (1,801/sq mi)
  - Urban: 17,907
- Climate: Aw

Kabarondo is a town and sector in the Republic of Rwanda.

== Location ==
Kabarondo is located in Kayonza District, Eastern Province. It is in the southeastern part of Rwanda, along the main road (RN3) from Kigali in Rwanda, to Nyakasanza, in Tanzania. Kabarondo is approximately 83 kilometres (52 mi) by road southeast of Kigali, the capital and largest city of Rwanda. The coordinates of Kabarondo are:2°00'38.0"S, 30°33'27.0"E (Latitude:-2.010556; Longitude:30.557500).

== Points of interest ==
The following points of interest are found in or near Kabarondo:

- Offices of Kabarondo Town Council
- Kabarondo Central Market
- Kabarondo Boys Centre - Established in 2010 by the Streets Ahead Children's Centre Association and the Property Professionals Breakfast Club SACCA.
- Kabarondo Vocational Training Centre
- Kabarondo Taxi Park

== See also ==
- List of banks in Rwanda
