= Gatsibo District =

Coordinates: 1°36′S 30°27′E

- District
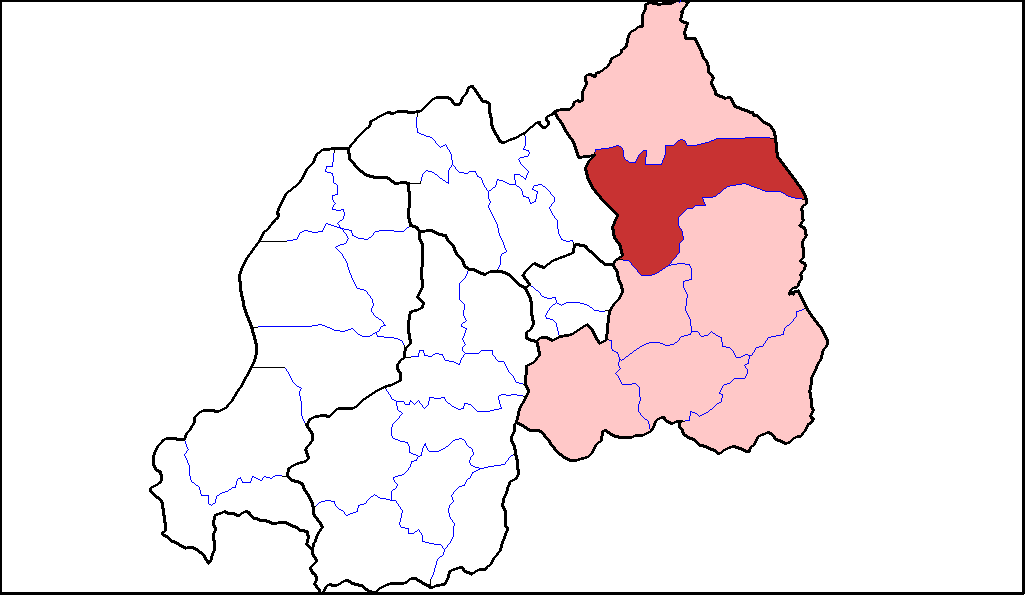
- Shown within Eastern Province and Rwanda
- Country: Rwanda
- Province: Eastern
- Capital: Kabarore

Area
  - District: 1,578 km^{2} (609 sq mi)

Population (2022 census)
  - District: 551,164
  - Density: 349.3/km^{2} (904.6/sq mi)
  - Urban: 55,351

Gatsibo is a district (akarere) in Eastern Province, Rwanda. Its capital is Kabarore. It lies in the sectors of Gatsibo and Kageyo. It is at about 1 hour and 50 minutes drive from Kigali.

== Geography ==
The district comprises areas in the north-east of Rwanda, between Kayonza and Nyagatare. The German post of Gatsibo was located here, as is the present-day Gabiro military camp. The eastern part of the district is in Akagera National Park, with the Kagera River forming the border with Tanzania.

== Location of Gatsibo District ==
This District is one of the seven Districts making the Eastern Province. It is divided into 14 Sectors which are; Gasange, Gatsibo, Gitoki, Kabarore, Kageyo, Kiramuruzi, Kiziguro, Muhura, Murambi, Ngarama, Nyagihanga, Remera, Rugarama and Rwimbogo. It is also divided into 69 cells and 602 villages “Imidugudu”. Spreading an area of 1,582.32 km2. The District borders with the Akagera National Park in East, to the North by Nyagatare District; to the West by Gicumbi District, to the South by Rwamagana and Kayonza Districts.

== Population ==
In 2012 National Census provisional results, the total population increased from 283,456 in 2002 to 433,997. Gatsibo District has population density of 270 persons per square kilometer. The increase in the population represents a growth rate of 53.1% between 2002 and 2012. Males represent 48% of the population whereas females represent 52% of the population.

== Agriculture ==
Gatsibo site is one of the Sustainable Agriculture Intensification and Food security Project (SAIP) intervention sites across Rwanda. SAIP's main development objective is to increase agricultural productivity, market access, and food security of the targeted beneficiaries in the project intervention areas across the country.

Out of the total area treated with comprehensive land husbandry technologies, 405.90Ha are subjected to rain fed agriculture, 45Ha gross area in the command area was developed for hillside irrigation.

Agriculture production and livestock is the principal economic activity in Gatsibo District. According to EICV5, 16.8% is Percentage of land under consolidation compared to 15.9% at Seven District Development Programme implementation report(2013–2018) 20 national level, 72.7% is Percentage of land protected against soil erosion compared to 68.5% at national level, 3.7% is Percentage of land under irrigation compared to 6%% at national level. According to EICV4, 77.3% are employed by agriculture sector including the wage farm (13.6%) and independent farmers (63.7%). The rest are either in the service or informal sectors. Crop production According to Seasonal Agricultural Survey - 2017 Season A, agricultural physical land represent % of the district's land, including cultivated land (75.2%), fallow (4.7%) and pasture and non-agricultural land represent only 20.1%. The same survey showed that the main crop produced are cereals (maize and Rice) representing 29.5% of cultivated land, followed by legumes and pulse with 28.5% and banana on 23.14% agriculture data8 (NISR, 2017 Seasonal Agricultural.

== Livestock ==
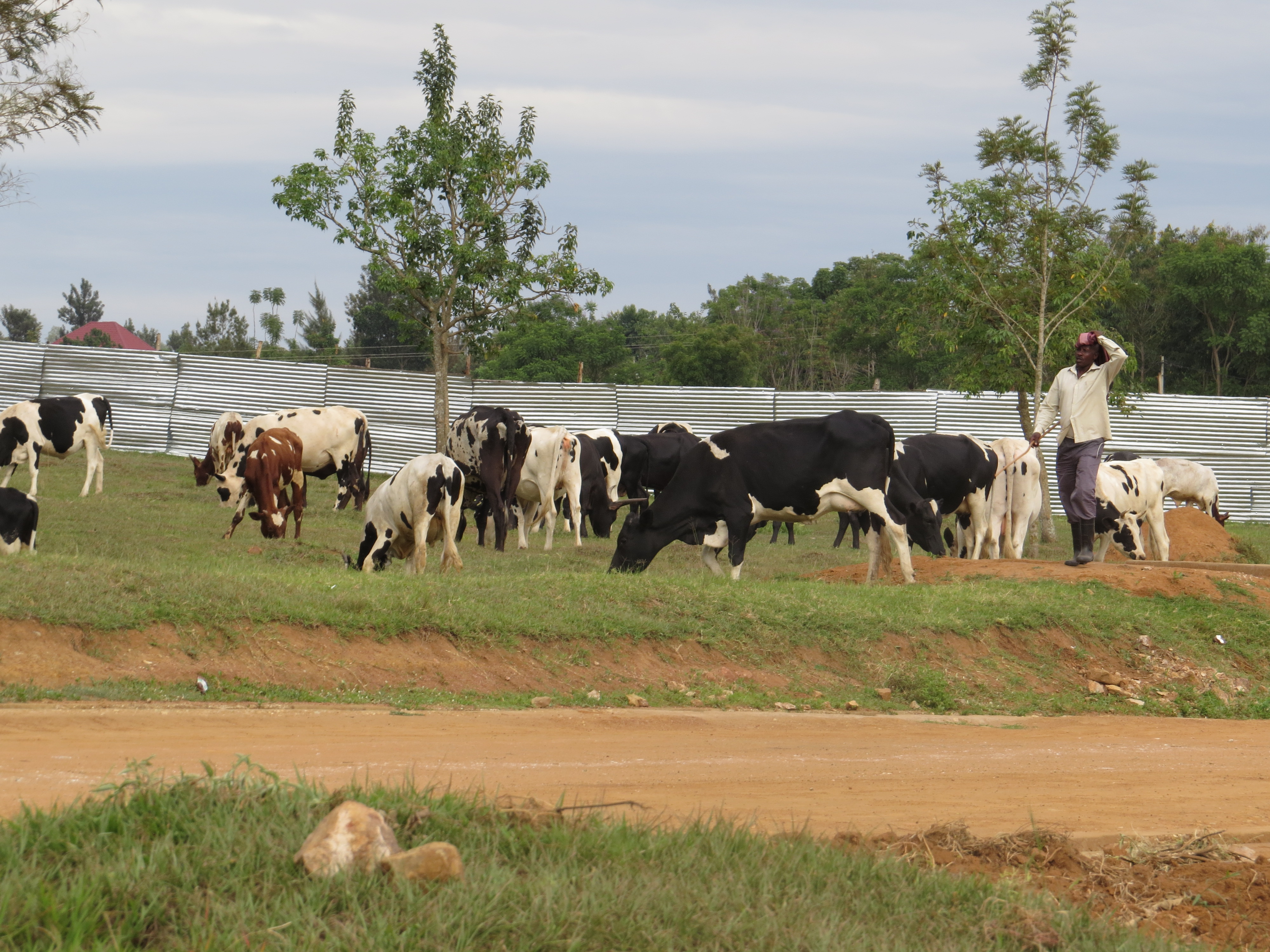
Pepeople grazing cows in Rwanda

In this, livestock is another important source of income and food for agricultural households. In Gatsibo District, 69.7% of HHs own any livestock mainly cows including 73.3% in HHs headed by male and 58.1% in HHs headed by female. The milk production is increasing over year following the introduction of exotic breeding being replacing local breeding. Today Gatsibo District counts 63,848 local cows while Jersey and Friesian are 1,427 and 3,102 respectively, whereas cross Cows estimated at 14,406 Cows. However, Gatsibo has five milk collections centre located in Rwimbogo, Kabarore, Ngarama, Kiziguro and Kiramuruzi Sector with a collection capacity of 2,000 liters (MINAGRI Record 2013).
