= Sectors of Rwanda =

Administrative subdivisions of Rwanda

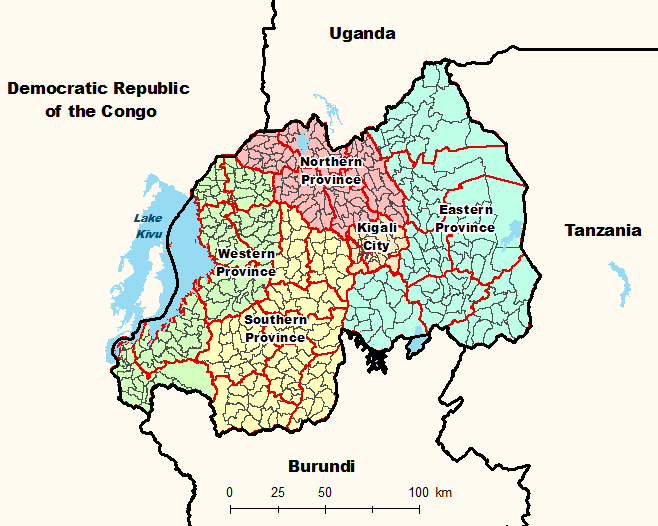
The sectors of Rwanda.

Sectors (Kinyarwanda: Imirenge, sing. umurenge, French: Secteurs) are the third level administrative subdivision in Rwanda.

== Organization ==
The Provinces of Rwanda are subdivided into 30 districts (Rwanda: uturere, sing. akarere). Each district is in turn divided into sectors. There are 416 Sectors.

== History ==
This entire administrative structure is undergoing a process of decentralisation – devolving greater authority to local governments and municipalities – following an administrative reorganisation begun in 2002.
