= Eastern Province, Rwanda =

Province of Rwanda

Eastern Province Intara y'Iburasirazuba
- Province
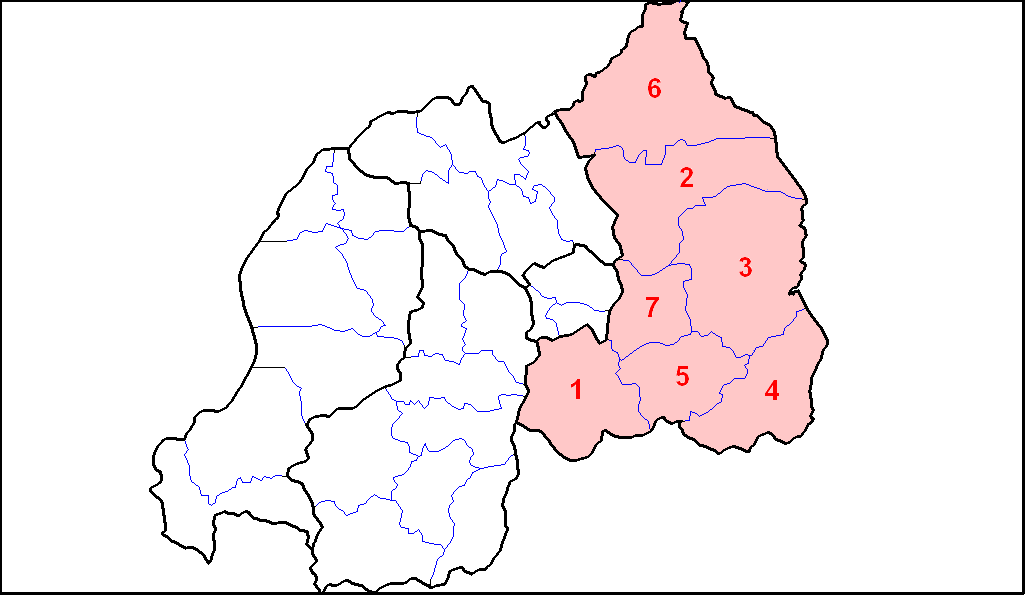
- Coordinates: 1°45′S 30°30′E
- Country: Rwanda
- Formed: 2006
- Capital: Rwamagana
- Districts: List: Bugesera; Gatsibo; Kayonza; Kirehe; Ngoma; Nyagatare; Rwamagana

Government
  - Governor: Pudence Rubingisa (14 December 2023-)

Area
  - Province: 9,458 km^{2} (3,652 sq mi)

Population (2022 census)
  - Province: 3,563,145
  - Density: 376.7/km^{2} (975.7/sq mi)
  - Urban: 745,935
  - Rural: 2,817,210
- Time zone: UTC+02:00 (CAT)
- ISO 3166 code: RW-02
- Other settlements: Kibungo, Nyagatare, Nyamata, Gahini, Kabarore, Kagitumba
- HDI (2023): 0.570 medium · 2nd of 5
- Website: https://www.easternprovince.gov.rw

Eastern Province ( in Kinyarwanda: Intara y'Iburasirazuba; French: Province de l'Est; Dutch: Oostelijke Provincie) is the largest, the most populous and the least densely populated of Rwanda's five provinces. It was created in early January 2006 as part of a government decentralization program that re-organized the country's local government structures.

It has seven districts: Bugesera, Gatsibo, Kayonza, Ngoma, Kirehe, Nyagatare and Rwamagana. The capital city of the Eastern Province is Rwamagana.

The Eastern Province comprises the former provinces of Kibungo and Umutara, most of Kigali Rural, and part of Byumba.

The Akagera National Park is situated is this province.

Religion in Eastern Province (2012 Census)
1. Roman Catholic (38.4%)
2. Protestant (43.7%)
3. Seventh-day Adventist (10.7%)
4. Muslim (2.60%)
5. Jehovah Witness (0.70%)
6. No Religion (2.60%)
7. Other (0.20%)
8. Not Stated (1.10%)

== History ==
It is not known when the territory of present day Rwanda was first inhabited, but it is thought that humans moved into the area following the last ice age either in the Neolithic period, around ten thousand years ago, or in the long humid period which followed, up to around 3000 BC. Archaeological excavations have revealed evidence of sparse settlement by hunter gatherers in the late Stone Age, followed by a larger population of early Iron Age settlers, who produced dimpled pottery and iron tools. By the 17th century it is thought that most of Rwanda was inhabited, with a fairly even spread of population across the hills of the country.

== List of the Eastern Province Districts by Population (2012) ==
Rank in Eastern Province Districts, 2012	Rank in Rwanda Districts, 2012	District	Population 15 August 2012	Population, 15 August 2002	Population Change 2002-2012 (%)	Population Density 2012 (km^{2})	Population Density Rank, Eastern Province 2012
1	2	Nyagatare	466,944	255,104	83.0	243	6
2	3	Gatsibo	433,997	283,456	53.1	275	5
3	9	Bugesera	363,339	266,775	36.2	282	4
4	10	Kayonza	346,751	209,723	65.3	179	7
5	13	Ngoma	340,983	235,109	44.0	390	2
6	15	Kirehe	338,562	229,468	48.6	288	3
7	26	Rwamagana	310,238	220,502	40.7	455	1
Total	-	Eastern Province	2,660,814	1,700,137	53.0	275	-

== Notes and references ==
=== Cited texts ===
- Briggs, Philip & Booth, Janice (2006) Rwanda - The Bradt Travel Guide. 3rd ed. London: Bradt Travel Guides. ISBN 1-84162-180-3
- Chrétien, Jean-Pierre (2003) The Great Lakes of Africa: Two Thousand Years of History Hardcover ed. Cambridge, MA: MIT Press. ISBN 1-890951-34-X
- Dorsey, Learthen (1994) Historical Dictionary of Rwanda. Scarecrow Press. ISBN 0-8108-2820-0
- Ministry of Local Government, Republic of Rwanda (MINALOC): "Eastern Province". Performance contracts in Year 2009-2010 (July 2009-June 2010). Accessed 2010-03-11.
- Munyakazi, Augustine & Ntagaramba, Johnson Funga (2005). Atlas of Rwanda French ed. Oxford: Macmillan Education. ISBN 0-333-95451-3

=== Area calculation ===
- Pixel sizes for provinces taken from traced maps: North = 28,547; East = 81,548; South = 50,844; West = 51,798; Kigali = 6,129
- Total Pixel size for Rwanda = 28,547 + 81,548 + 50,844 + 51,798 + 6,129 = 218,866
- => Eastern Province % of total area: 81,548 / 218,866 = 37.26%
- Total area of Rwanda = 26,338 km^{2} (10,169 sq mi)
  - "Rwanda". The World Facebook. United States Central Intelligence Agency. 4 March 2010. Accessed 11 March 2010.
- => Area of Eastern Province = 26,338 km^{2} (10,169 sq mi) x 37.26% = 9,813 km^{2} (3,789 sq mi)
