= Cimerwa Cement Limited =

Cement manufacturer in Rwanda

Coordinates: 02°36′25″S 29°01′03″E

- Type: Private
- Industry: Manufacture of Construction Materials
- Founded: January 1, 1982; 44 years ago
- Headquarters: Bugarama, Rwanda
- Key people: Regis Rugemanshuro; Chairman; Albert Kipkemoi Sigei; Executive Director
- Products: Cement
- Website: Homepage

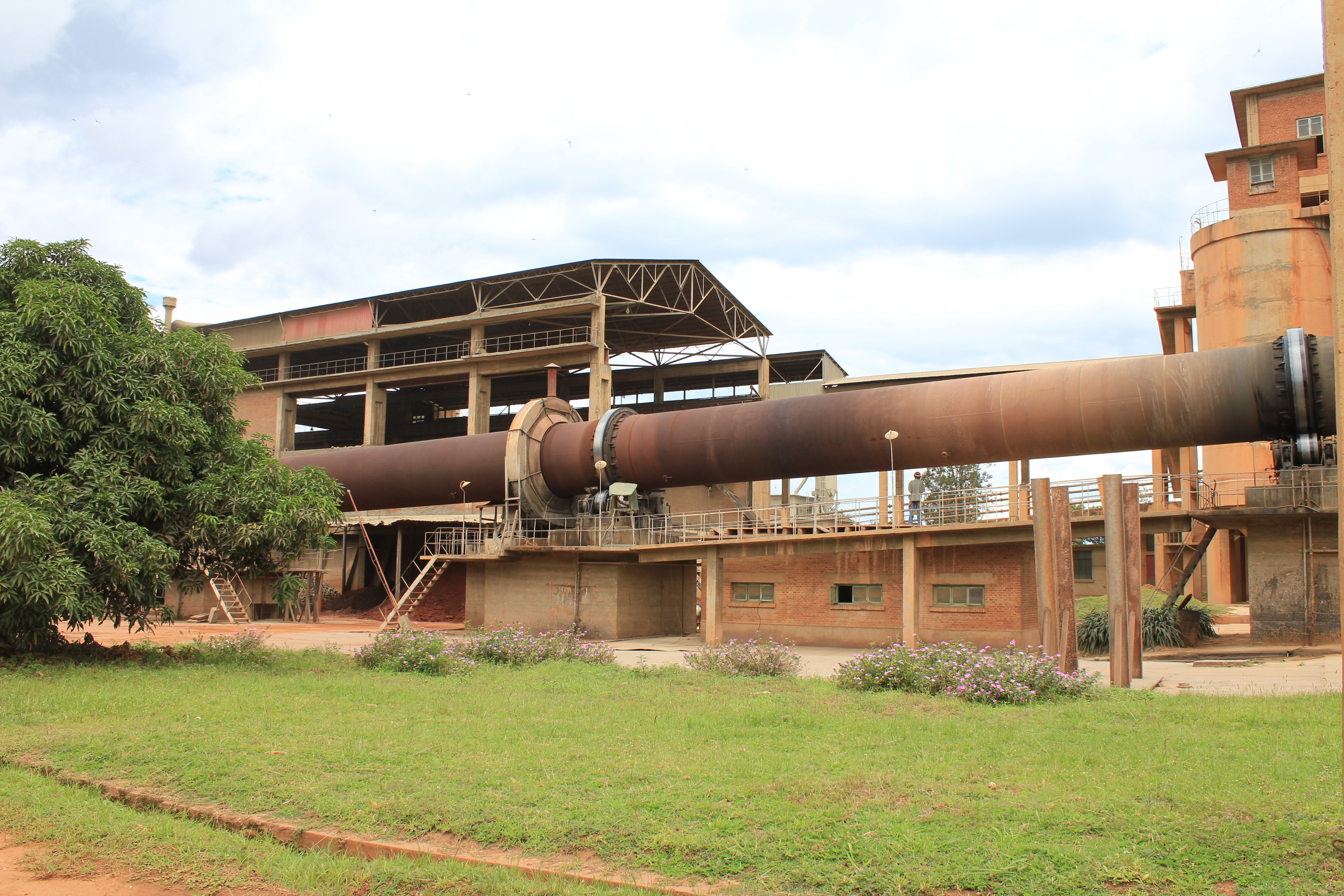

Cimerwa Cement Limited (CCL) is a manufacturer of cement in Rwanda with capacity of approximately 600,000 tonnes per year.

== History ==
The company was established in 1982, with capacity of 50,000 metric tonnes annually. It was managed by a Chinese company, CBMC, under a "build-own-operate-transfer" model. During the 1994 Rwandan genocide, plant operations were suspended and 53 employees died. In 2001, plant capacity was increased to 100,000 metric tonnes annually.

In 2006, Cimerwa was privatized under the Rwanda Investment Group. Ownership transferred to several Rwanda-based institutions. PPC Limited acquired a 51 percent ownership in Cimerwa, for US$69.4 million in 2013. In 2015, the company assumed a new corporate identity to reflect the new ownership.

Before November 2023, Cimerwa Cement Limited operated as a 51 percent subsidiary of Pretoria Portland Cement Company (PPC Limited), a South African cement-manufacturing conglomerate, whose shares of stock are traded on the Johannesburg Stock Exchange. The table below illustrates the shareholding in the company, as of June 2019. As of June 2019, the entire 49 percent shareholding owed by Rwandan shareholders was up for sale.

Cimerwa Cement Limited Stock Ownership
Rank	Name of Owner	Percentage Ownership
1	Pretoria Portland Cement Company of South Africa	51.00
2	Government of Rwanda	16.54
3	Rwanda Social Security Board	20.24
4	Rwanda Investment Group	11.45
5	Sonarwa Group	0.76
	Total	100.00

In November 2023, the shareholders in the business signed share purchase agreements selling 99.9 percent shares of stock in the company to National Cement Holdings Limited (National Cement), based in Kenya, with subsidiaries in Kenya, Uganda and now Rwanda. The deal that requires regulatory approval in South Africa, Rwanda and COMESA, is expected to close in Q1 2024.

On 25 January 2024, after paying US$85 million, National Cement of Kenya acquired 99.94 percent of the Cimerwa shares. The new owners plan to invest another US$60 million into the company's operations to increase efficiencies, scale up output and reduce the price of cement to the consumer. Following the conclusion of the sale, the shares of stock of the company will be de-listed from the Rwanda Securities Exchange.

=== Pretoria Portland Cement Company ===
Pretoria Portland Cement Company controls eleven cement factories and a lime manufacturing facility in six African countries including South Africa, Botswana, Ethiopia and Rwanda.

== Location ==
Its main factory is located in Muganza Sector, about 10 kilometres (6.2 mi) north of the town of Bugarama, in Rusizi District, in the Western Province of Rwanda. The city of Cyangugu, the largest urban center in Rusizi District, is located approximately 33.5 kilometres (20.8 mi), by road, northwest of the factory and is the location of the district headquarters. The factory uses imported coal from Malawi and Tanzania, to fuel its kilns.

The installed factory capacity is 600,000 metric tonnes annually. After operating at less than 60% of capacity (approximately 350,000 metric tonnes annually) until 2018, the factory received a 3.3 billion dollar upgrade that increased its capacity to 74% of installed capacity (approximately 441,223 metric tonnes annually)

Prior to the 2018 upgrade, Cimerwa could produce 27,000 metric tonnes monthly, or approximately 54 percent of the 50,000 metric tonnes needed monthly to satisfy Rwanda's cement needs. With production of an expected 441,223 metric tonnes after the upgrade, it is expected cement importation into Rwanda will reduce.

The coordinates of its main factory are: 02°36'25.0"S, 29°01'03.0"E (Latitude:-2.606944; Longitude:29.017500). The firm also maintains offices in the city of Kigali, the capital and largest city of Rwanda.

== Products ==
As of May 2020, CIMERWA produced four types of portland cement; namely 1. SUREBUILD, a 42.5N premium cement meant for heavy construction projects 2. SURECEM, a 32.5N all-purpose cement ideal for concrete, mortar, plaster and brick joinery 3. SUREROAD, another 32.5N product, is a custom-made cement meant for road construction and 4. SUREWALL, is a 22.5X masonry cement specifically designed for plastering and brick joinery.

== See also ==
- List of cement manufacturers in Rwanda
