= Tea production in Rwanda =

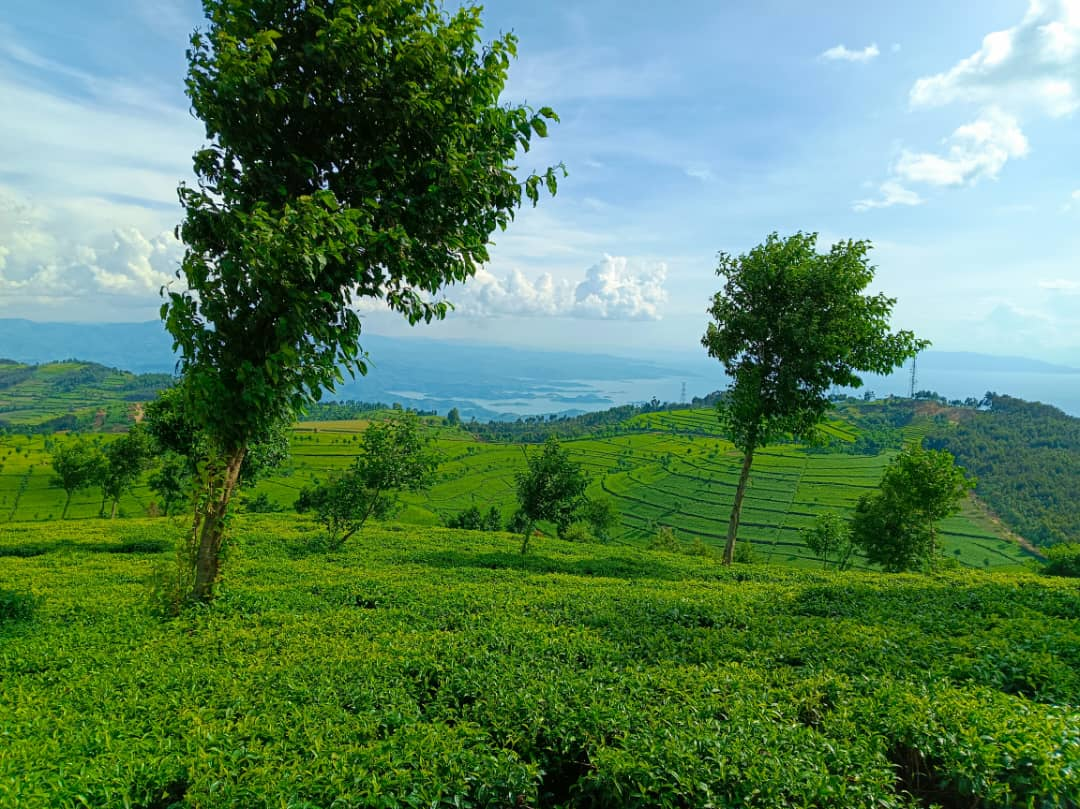
RutsiroTea Plantation

Tea production in Rwanda traces its roots back to the early 20th century, when German missionaries introduced tea plants to the country. Since then, the Rwandan tea industry has grown, transforming the nation into a prominent tea producing country in East Africa. Today, tea plantations span across the country's landscapes, with the Western districts of Rutsiro, Nyamasheke, and Nyabihu being the primary tea cultivators.

== Climate and soil ==
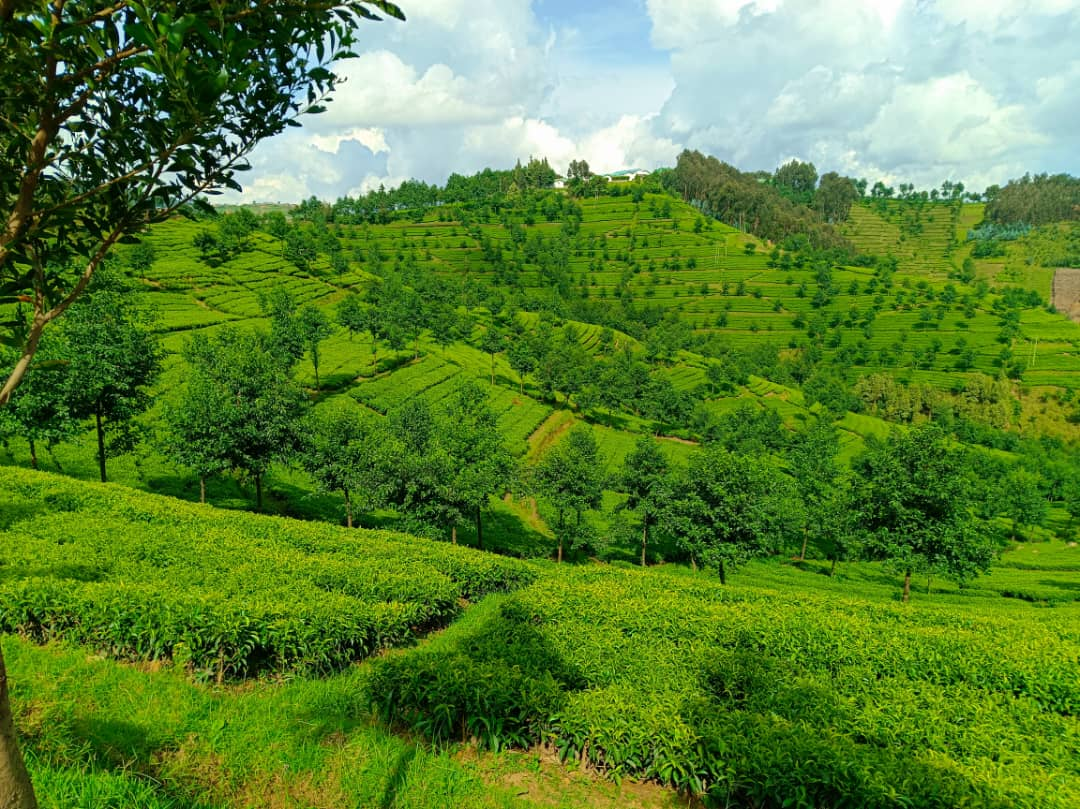
Climate in a mountainous tea plantation

Rwandan tea plantations benefit from a combination of factors, including high altitude, volcanic soils, and a temperate climate. The country's elevation ranges from 1,000 to 4,500 meters above sea level, offering conditions for tea cultivation between 1,800 and 2,800 meters. The volcanic soil enriched with nutrients imparts a distinct flavour profile to Rwandan teas, distinguishing them from teas elsewhere.

== Types ==
The county primarily produces tea in Rutsiro, crafted using orthodox methods that involves withering, rolling, oxidation, and drying of the tea leaves. This process preserves the natural characteristics and flavours of the tea resulting in a rich and nuanced cup.

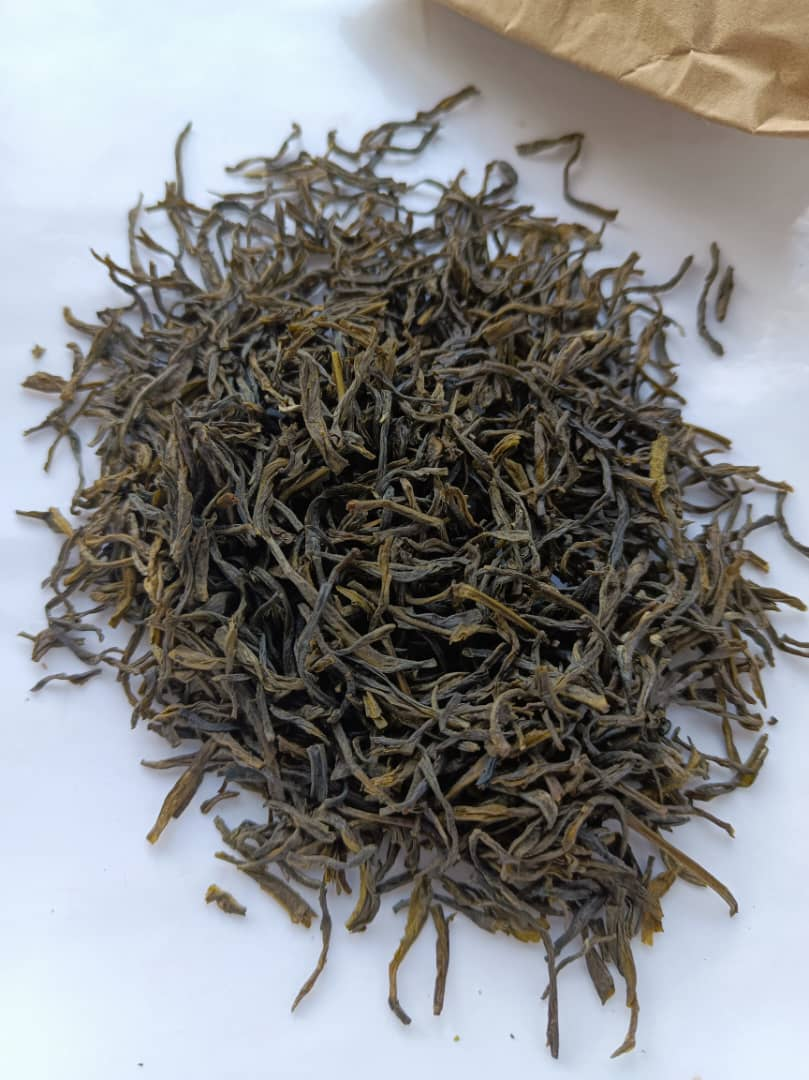
Tea

Black teas are the most significant variety, however the country also produces green teas each with a different taste.

== Sustainability and social impact ==
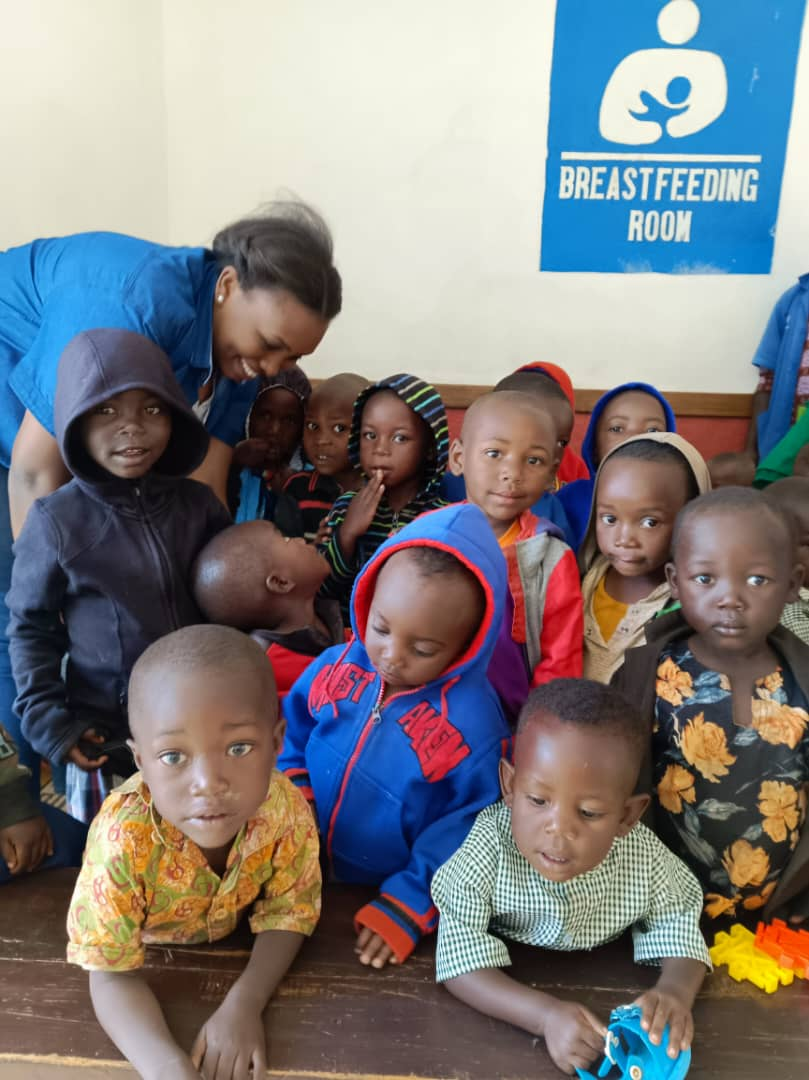
Rutsiro tea factory early child development center

One of the Industries known as Rwanda Mountain tea LTD engaged in promoting sustainable practices of social impact through early childhood development child care centres of the all the families which are working in the tea plantation farming. and initiatives such as Rainforest Alliance and Fairtrade certification's Tea estates in Rwanda prioritizes environmentally friendly cultivation methods, as well as biodiversity conservation and land management. these methods ensure long-term sustainability of Rwanda tea production while benefiting local communities through health care and education opportunities.

== Global recognition and demand ==
Rwanda tea has gained international recognition for its exceptional quality and characteristics. The tea has gained acclaim at prestigious tea competitions, attracting he attention of connoisseurs and buyers worldwide. The demand for Rwanda tea continues to grow with exports reaching numerous countries including the United States, United Kingdom, Germany, Pakistan, and Japan.
