= Kamembe =

Kamembe may refer to:

- Kamembe, the industrial and transport heart of Cyangugu in Rwanda.
- Kamembe Airport, the main airport of Cyangugu.
