= Bugarama =

- Town
- Location in Rwanda
- Coordinates: 2°41′50″S 29°00′30″E
- Country: Rwanda
- Province: Western Province
- District: Rusizi District
- Elevation: 3,900 ft (1,200 m)

Population (2022 census)
  - Total: 40,276

Bugarama is a town in western Rwanda.

== Location ==
Bugarama is located in Rusizi District, Western Province, close to the borders with Burundi (to the east) and the Democratic Republic of the Congo (to the west). It is about 278 kilometres (173 mi), by road, southwest of Kigali, Rwanda's capital and largest city, and approximately 38 kilometres (24 mi), by road, southeast of Kamembe/Cyangugu, where the district headquarters are located.

== Population ==
The population of Bugarama sector was enumerated at 42,830 on 15 August 2022. Of these, 21,633 (50.5 percent) were females and 21,197 (49.5 percent) were males. The population in the sector was growing at an average annual rate, calculated at 3.6 percent, between 2012 and 2022.

== Points of interest ==
The following points of interest lie within the town limits or close to the edges of town:

- Offices of Cavicon Consultants, Safkoko, FHI
- The headquarters and factories of Cimerwa Cement Limited
- The headquarters of Bugarama Sector
- The International border crossing between Rwanda and the Democratic Republic of the Congo at Bugarama City
- The International border crossing between Rwanda and Burundi at Ruhwa
- A branch of Bank of Kigali
- A branch of Banque Populaire du Rwanda
- A branch of Ruyange Sacco
- Cyamudongo National Forest
- Bugarama Rice Plantation - A project of Rural Development Inter-Diocesan Service
- Bugarama Islamic Health Center
- Church: Eglise Catholique Saint Paul Muko
- High School: Groupe Scolaire St Paul Muko
- International Market of Bugarama

== Climate ==
Climate data for Bugarama (1991–2020)
Month	Jan	Feb	Mar	Apr	May	Jun	Jul	Aug	Sep	Oct	Nov	Dec	Year
Record high °C (°F)	36.8 (98.2)	36.7 (98.1)	35.7 (96.3)	33.2 (91.8)	33.0 (91.4)	33.9 (93.0)	36.0 (96.8)	36.7 (98.1)	38.8 (101.8)	40.7 (105.3)	37.6 (99.7)	36.0 (96.8)	40.7 (105.3)
Mean daily maximum °C (°F)	29.6 (85.3)	30.0 (86.0)	29.8 (85.6)	29.3 (84.7)	28.9 (84.0)	29.8 (85.6)	30.5 (86.9)	31.4 (88.5)	31.9 (89.4)	31.3 (88.3)	29.6 (85.3)	29.1 (84.4)	30.1 (86.2)
Daily mean °C (°F)	24.0 (75.2)	24.2 (75.6)	24.1 (75.4)	24.0 (75.2)	23.9 (75.0)	23.8 (74.8)	23.7 (74.7)	24.5 (76.1)	25.4 (77.7)	25.3 (77.5)	24.2 (75.6)	23.8 (74.8)	24.2 (75.6)
Mean daily minimum °C (°F)	18.3 (64.9)	18.4 (65.1)	18.4 (65.1)	18.7 (65.7)	18.8 (65.8)	17.7 (63.9)	16.9 (62.4)	17.5 (63.5)	18.9 (66.0)	19.2 (66.6)	18.7 (65.7)	18.4 (65.1)	18.3 (64.9)
Record low °C (°F)	14.5 (58.1)	15.2 (59.4)	14.9 (58.8)	7.8 (46.0)	12.2 (54.0)	13.9 (57.0)	13.3 (55.9)	13.3 (55.9)	14.3 (57.7)	14.9 (58.8)	15.7 (60.3)	15.2 (59.4)	7.8 (46.0)
Average precipitation mm (inches)	192.6 (7.58)	192.2 (7.57)	237.0 (9.33)	171.3 (6.74)	249.7 (9.83)	92.2 (3.63)	8.3 (0.33)	29.3 (1.15)	76.6 (3.02)	263.4 (10.37)	145.6 (5.73)	156.1 (6.15)	1,814.3 (71.43)
Average precipitation days (≥ 1.0 mm)	21.7	19.2	23.2	20.3	15.3	2.8	0.7	2.4	11.4	21.9	20.9	21.0	180.9
Source: NOAA

== See also ==
- Bukavu
- Lake Kivu
- Access Bank Rwanda
