= Bisangwa =

Rwandan chief and noble (c. 1880–1955)

Head of the Rubengera territory
- In office c. 1880 – July 1896
- Monarchs: Kigeli IV Rwabugiri; Mibambwe IV Rutarindwa

Commander of the Ingangurarugo
- In office ? – July 1896
- Monarchs: Kigeli IV Rwabugiri; Mibambwe IV Rutarindwa

Personal details
- Born: Kingdom of Rwanda
- Died: July 1896 Shangi, Kingdom of Rwanda

Military service
- Allegiance: Kingdom of Rwanda
- Branch/service: Royal Rwandan Army
- Commands: Inkaranka; Ingangurarugo
- Battles/wars: Battle of Shangi †

Bisangwa (died July 1896) was a Rwandan noble, chief, and a leading official of the Kingdom of Rwanda during the rule of Kings Kigeli IV Rwabugiri and Mibambwe IV Rutarindwa. He served as a royal advisor, head of the territory administered from Rubengera, military commander and head of the Ingangurarugo royal guard. Deemed a fair and effective notable, Bisangwa was highly regarded and eventually became one of the leaders of a royalist faction opposing the activities of Queen Mother Kanjogera. He was killed in combat during the Battle of Shangi, a border conflict between Rwanda and the Congo Free State. His demise contributed to the outbreak of a violent crisis and the eventual overthrow of Mibambwe IV Rutarindwa.

== Biography ==
=== Early life and rise in prominence ===
Bisangwa was the son of Rugombituli or Rugombituri, and a member of the Shambo aristocratic lineage. He had a brother named Sehene. Rugombituli had been a destitute who was "adopted" by the court of King Mutara II Rwogera, achieving some prominence and the status of a noble. Thus, Bisangwa's immediate family was described as "unremarkable" as well as being of "modest origins", and he was deemed a Hutu "probably because of his modest condition". Bisangwa was orphaned at a young age and raised at the court.

As he grew up, the Kingdom of Rwanda was embroiled in a series of political crises, as various factions violently struggled to control the court. After Mutara II Rwogera's death in 1867, King Kigeli IV Rwabugiri was effectively controlled by a faction headed by his mother Murorunkwere until he vame of age around 1877. At this point, the monarch overthrew his mother's faction, resulting in a violent struggle which ended in her intended or accidental death. Afterward, King Kigeli IV Rwabugiri chose his own circle of close advisors. Bisangwa was one of the four most important advisors, alongside Nyantaba, Nyirimigabo, and Mugugu. Of these, Bisangwa and Mugugu enjoyed the monarch's special trust due to their lowly background, as they owed everything to their patron and were thus considered most loyal. Bisangwa was made chief of Bugoyi (in present-day Rubavu District) and leader of the local Inkaranka battalion of the royal army. The king generally preferred to put people of modest origin into important positions, and Bisangwa's brother Sehene was also raised in rank by being appointed notable of Mayaga (in present-day Nyanza District) and overseer of the royal cattle herds.

=== Chief advisor of Kigeli IV Rwabugiri ===
As one of Kigeli IV Rwabugiri's main advisors, Bisangwa was eventually appointed head of several provinces, administered from Rubengera, around 1880. His lands covered the area between Bwishaza to beyond Bugoyi. Using these territories, he funded a new unit within the royal army, initially organized by splitting off contingents from the older Abakemba unit. He also rose to lead the Ingangurarugo royal guard. The latter position effectively made him the head of the royal army. Over the course of his career, he became an experienced military leader. Despite his high-ranking position and the fractious nature of the court, Bisangwa was praised for refraining from falsely accusing other court members and instead intervening on the behalf of victims of slander, requesting pardons by Kigeli IV Rwabugiri.

To avoid a succession struggle after his death, Kigeli IV Rwabugiri eventually chose one of his adult sons, Mibambwe IV Rutarindwa, as a successor and appointed him co-regent in 1889. In accordance to Rwandan customs, a "Queen Mother" was traditionally also appointed when a new monarch took power. As Mibambwe IV Rutarindwa's mother was already dead, Kigeli IV Rwabugiri appointed his favorite wife, Kanjogera, as the Queen Mother for Mibambwe IV Rutarindwa. This was a controversial choice, as Kanjogera belonged to the Bega clan and also had an underage son who was theoretically eligible to succeed the throne; both of these traits should have made Kanjogera ineligible for the position as Queen Mother. In choosing her, Kigeli IV Rwabugiri ignored the traditions and his concerned advisors, possibly being motivated by his love for Kanjogera and/or a belief that he could appease the powerful Bega by connecting them with the new monarch without granting them full control. Bisangwa was charged by Kigeli IV Rwabugiri to help protect this delicate system and the rule of Mibambwe IV Rutarindwa in the future.

In 1894, an armed expedition of German explorer Gustav Adolf von Götzen entered Rwanda, and made diplomatic contacts with the Rwandan court. The European reportedly offended Kigeli IV Rwabugiri by his brashness and ignorance of the Rwandan customs, whereupon the king decided to punish him. As Götzen's expedition continued its journey, the monarch ordered Bisangwa to attack the European in retaliation. He followed his monarch's command and led a small military force to carry ourt a nightly ambush. However, the German-led group managed to repel the attack.

=== Succession conflicts and death ===
After Kigeli IV Rwabugiri's death in 1895, Mibambwe IV Rutarindwa became sole monarch, but was soon conspired against by Kanjogera and a Bega-led faction. The supporters of the monarch were headed by Bisangwa, Mugugu, and Nyaruguru whose powerful army units initially prevented any outright actions of the Bega faction. Bisangwa was regarded as the most powerful royalist notable of the time. In 1896, a Force Publique expedition crossed into southwestern Rwanda at Shangi, attempting to claim the area for the Congo Free State. In response, the Rwandan court sent a large army against the invaders, including many of Mibambwe IV Rutarindwa's best and most loyal troops. Overall command of the army was granted to Prince Nshozamihigo, a son of Kigeli IV Rwabugiri, but he was assisted by Bisangwa and Muhigirwa. Bisangwa was chosen as one of the commanders due to his experience with European weaponry, having fought against Götzen's expedition two years prior. According to Frank Rusagara, the dispatch of the elite royalist troops alongside their royalist officers was likely part of a conspiracy by the Bega faction.

When they arrived at Shangi in July 1896, the Rwandans charged the Force Publique camp with spears and bows. Bisangwa led a vanguard with his personal elite Ibisumizi company, and his first assault managed to surprise the Congolese troops. Once Shangi's defenders reacted, however, the Rwandans were quickly decimated by the gunfire of the Force Publique soldiers, causing Prince Nshozamihigo to immediately flee the battlefield. Bisangwa and Muhigirwa remained on their posts. After the first attack's failure, Bisangwa reportedly sent a messenger to the royal court, stating "When one is defeated abroad, one returns to his own country; when one is beaten at home, where does one go then?" He then ordered two more assaults. The Rwandans only broke when Force Publique commander Constantin Sandrart personally targeted and shot Bisangwa through the head during the third attack, whereupon the royal army retreated and largely dispersed. The defeat in the Battle of Shangi and the death of Bisangwa greatly weakened the political position of Mibambwe IV Rutarindwa, contributing to his overthrow by the Bega faction in the Rucunshu Coup of December 1896. Bisangwa's brother Sehene and his ally Mugugu were among those murdered amid the takeover by the Bega faction.
