= Kibuye Province =

Former province of Rwanda

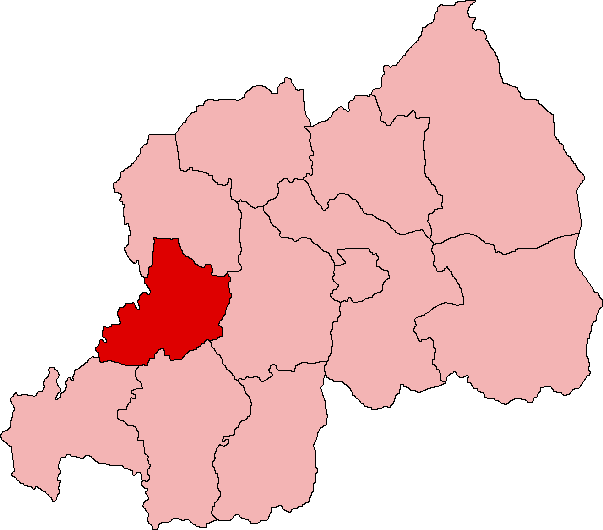
Map showing the former Kibuye Province in Rwanda

The Province of Kibuye was one of the 12 provinces of Rwanda prior to 2006. These were known as prefectures before the administrative reform of 2002. Kibuye, Rwanda was the "capital" (or, in certain official Rwandan texts, the "major city") of the province.

The territorial reform on 1 January 2006 merged the province with the Cyangugu Province, Gisenyi Province, and part of Ruhengeri Province, to create the new Western Province.

== See also ==
- Provinces of Rwanda
