= Félicité Niyitegeka =

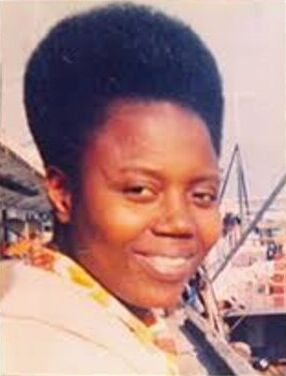
Félicité Niyitegeka

Félicité Niyitegeka (1934 - 21 April 1994) was a Rwandan Catholic woman in charge of Centre Saint Pierre in Gisenyi (now Rubavu), in the Western Province of the country.

== Biography ==
She was born in 1934 to Simon Sekabwa and Angelina Nyirampabuka. Those close to her nicknamed her 'ikimanuka' as a result of her likable personality and integrity. In the 1950s, Niyitegeka joined the Auxiliaries of the Apostolate, a lay Catholic order.

Niyitegeka is remembered for refusing to part ways with the Tutsi people who found refuge at Centre Saint Pierre in Gisenyi (currently Rubavu District). When her brother asked her to separate from the Tutsis since the military was aware of her activities, she refused. When the militias came, she already had over 30 Tutsi refugees in her house. She was killed on 21 April 1994 as part of the larger genocide against the Tutsi. The Interahamwe militia also killed those she was sheltering.

== Awards and honours ==
The Chancellery for Heroes, National Order and Decorations of Honours (CHENO) decorated Félicité Niyitegeka with the Rwanda National Heroes, highest Award, the Imena Award. Heroes in the Imena Category are reputed for their extraordinary acts for the country marked by sacrifice, high importance and example. Félicité Niyitegeka is one of only four Rwandans to be awarded this highest category of Heroes award. Others include Michel Rwagasana (‘Imena’), Agathe Uwilingiyimana (‘Imena’), Umwami Mutara III Rudahigwa (‘Imena’) and Nyange Secondary School students.
