= Rambura =

- Village and sector
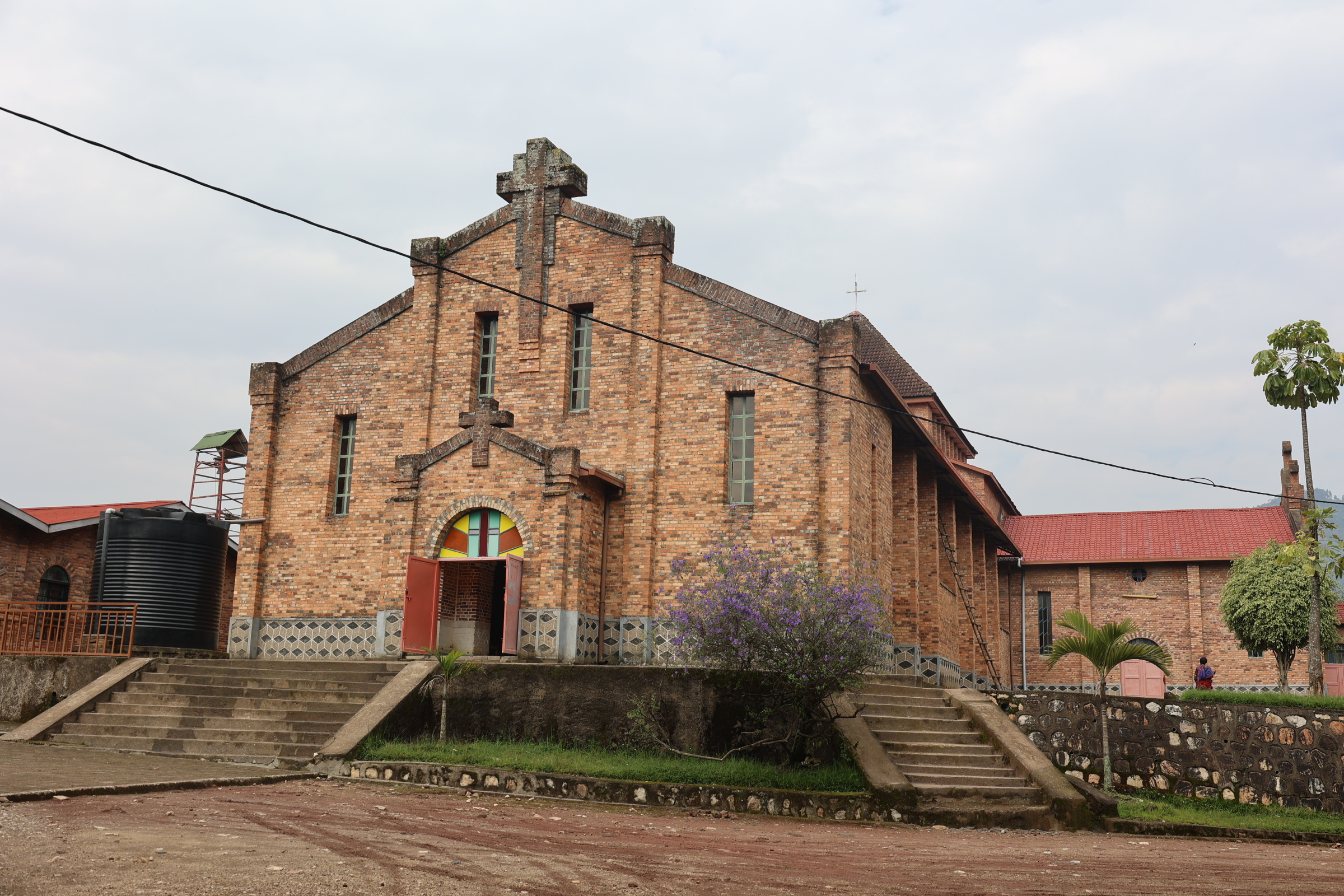
- The Catholic Parish Church in Rambura

- Location within Rwanda
- Coordinates: 1.67709°S 29.51765°E
- Country: Rwanda
- Province: Western Province
- District: Nyabihu District

Area
  - Village and sector: 63.66 km^{2} (24.58 sq mi)

Population (2022 census)
  - Village and sector: 28,820
  - Density: 452.7/km^{2} (1,173/sq mi)
  - Urban: 4,393

Rambura is a village and sector in Nyabihu District, Western Province in Rwanda, with a population of 28,820 (2022 census) and an area of 63.66 square kilometers.
