= Kamembe Airport =

Airport in Kamembe, Rwanda

Kamembe International Airport
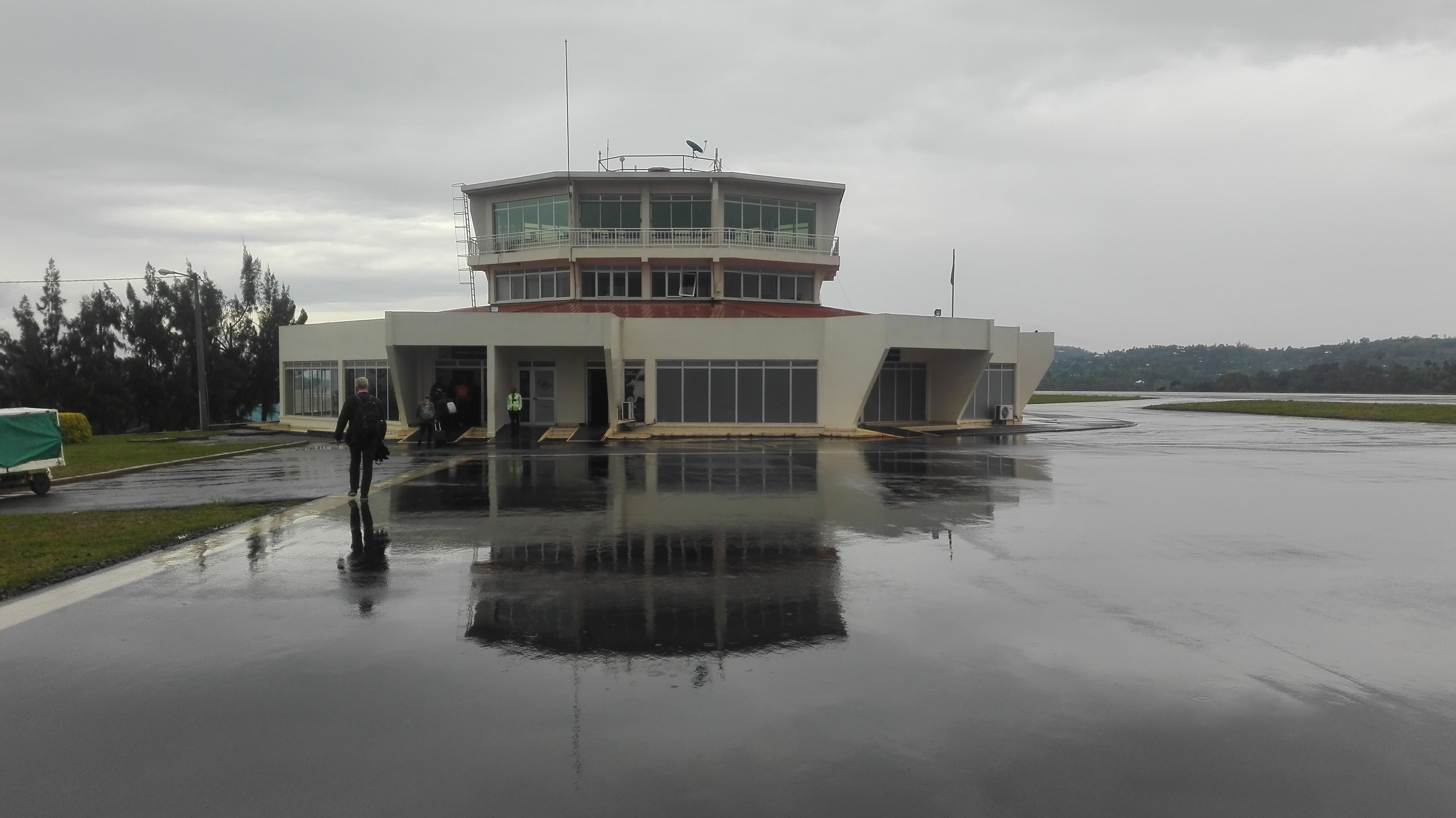
- Kamembe airport terminal seen from the runway, 2017
- IATA: KME; ICAO: HRZA

Summary
- Airport type: Civil
- Owner: Rwandan Government
- Operator: Rwanda Airports Authority
- Serves: Cyangugu
- Location: Kamembe, Rwanda
- Elevation AMSL: 5,192 ft (1,583 m)
- Coordinates: 02°27′23″S 28°54′35″E

Map
- Location of the airport in Rwanda

Runways
| Direction | Length | | Surface |
| Direction | ft | m | Surface |
|---|---|---|---|
| 02/20 | 4,921 | 1,500 | Asphalt |

Kamembe International Airport (IATA: KME, ICAO: HRZA) is an airport in Rwanda. RwandAir operates a Dash 8-Q400 with seven flights per week to and from Kigali International Airport. The airport receives charter flights from Tanzania, Uganda and the Democratic Republic of the Congo, though not on a regular schedule.

During the Rwandan Civil War, Kamembe Airport was suggested as a site for transiting French arms to the interim government after April 1994.

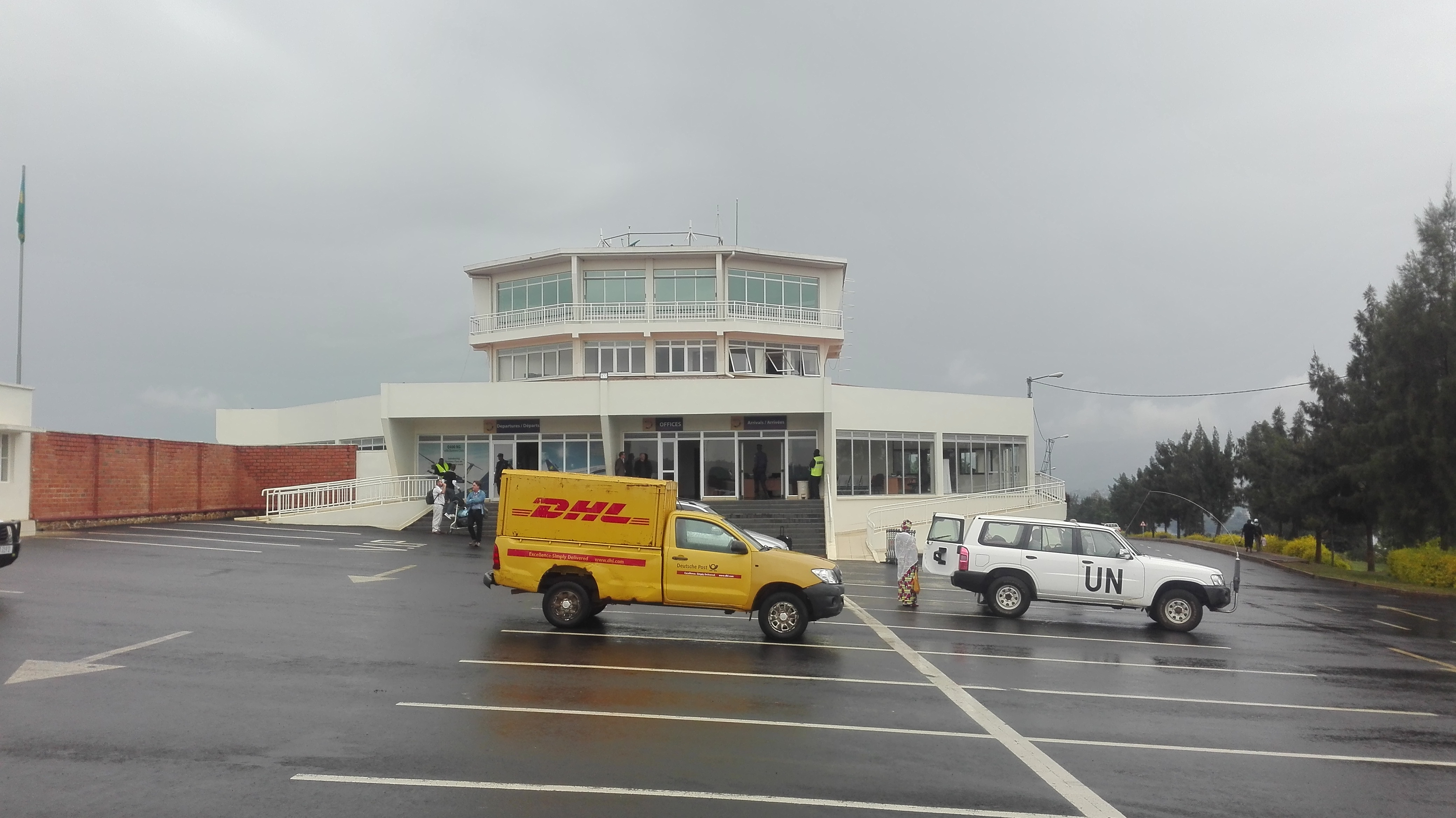
Kamembe Airporte, 2017

== Location ==
Kamembe Airport is located approximately 5 kilometres (3 mi), by road, north of Cyangugu's central business district, Rusizi District, in the Western Province of Rwanda. The airport is located approximately 147.5 kilometres (92 mi), by air, southwest of Kigali International Airport, the largest airport in the country. It sits at an altitude of 5,192 feet (1,583 m) above mean sea level. The geographical coordinates of Kamembe Airport are: 02°27'23.0"S, 28°54'35.0"E (Latitude:-2.456389; Longitude:28.909722).

== Overview ==
Kamembe is a medium airport with one paved runway 02/20 that measures 4,921 feet (1,500 m) long and 148 feet (45 m) wide.

== History ==
The airport terminal building was heavily damaged by a 2008 earthquake. In 2010 the Rwanda government announced that Kamembe Airport would be repaired and modernized.

By the end of 2012, a new terminal was completed, a new control tower was opened, and Techno Sky, a branch of the Italian publicly-owned ENAV corporation, had installed new navigation systems.

During a May 2013 visit, Infrastructure Minister Albert Nsengiyumva announced that the runway would be widened and lengthened from 1.5 kilometres (4,900 ft) to 2 kilometres (6,600 ft) by 2015. The airport re-opened in June 2015 and RwandAir began scheduled flights from the airport.
