= Battle of Shangi =

1896 border conflict between Rwanda and the Congo Free State

- Part of the Scramble for Africa
Date	July 1896
Location	Shangi, Rwanda 2°24′12″S 29°0′21″E
Result	Congo Free State victory

Belligerents
Congo Free State	Kingdom of Rwanda

Commanders and leaders
Constantin Sandrart	Nshozamihigo (AWOL); Bisangwa †; Muhigirwa

Units involved
Force Publique	Rwandan royal army: Ingangurarugo; Inyarugu

Strength
c. 300	Hundreds to thousands

Casualties and losses
Small	Heavy
- Location within Rwanda

The Battle of Shangi was a border conflict fought in July 1896 between the Congo Free State and the Kingdom of Rwanda. An expedition of the Congo Free State, a colonial polity personally controlled by Leopold II of Belgium, had previously entered Rwandan territory and set up a fortified camp at Shangi, directly challenging the rule of Rwandan King Mibambwe IV Rutarindwa over his border territories. In response, the Rwandan court sent a large army led by Prince Nshozamihigo and two experienced commanders, Bisangwa and Muhigirwa, to evict the Congolese forces. Though the Rwandans repeatedly charged the Shangi camp, using spears and bows, they were defeated by the Belgian-Congolese troops who had access to modern guns and were entrenched. After the Congo Free State commander Constantin Sandrart personally shot Bisangwa, the Rwandan army retreated.

Despite the Congo Free State's victory, the Shangi post was soon abandoned due to problems in the Congo Basin. Regardless, the Battle of Shangi was a political disaster for the Rwandan monarchy, contributing to the eventual overthrow of Mibambwe IV Rutarindwa and the court's acceptance of German overlordship. The German Empire subsequently helped to secure the western Rwandan border, setting up a new camp at Shangi and protecting the area against further Belgian-Congolese incursions.

== Background ==
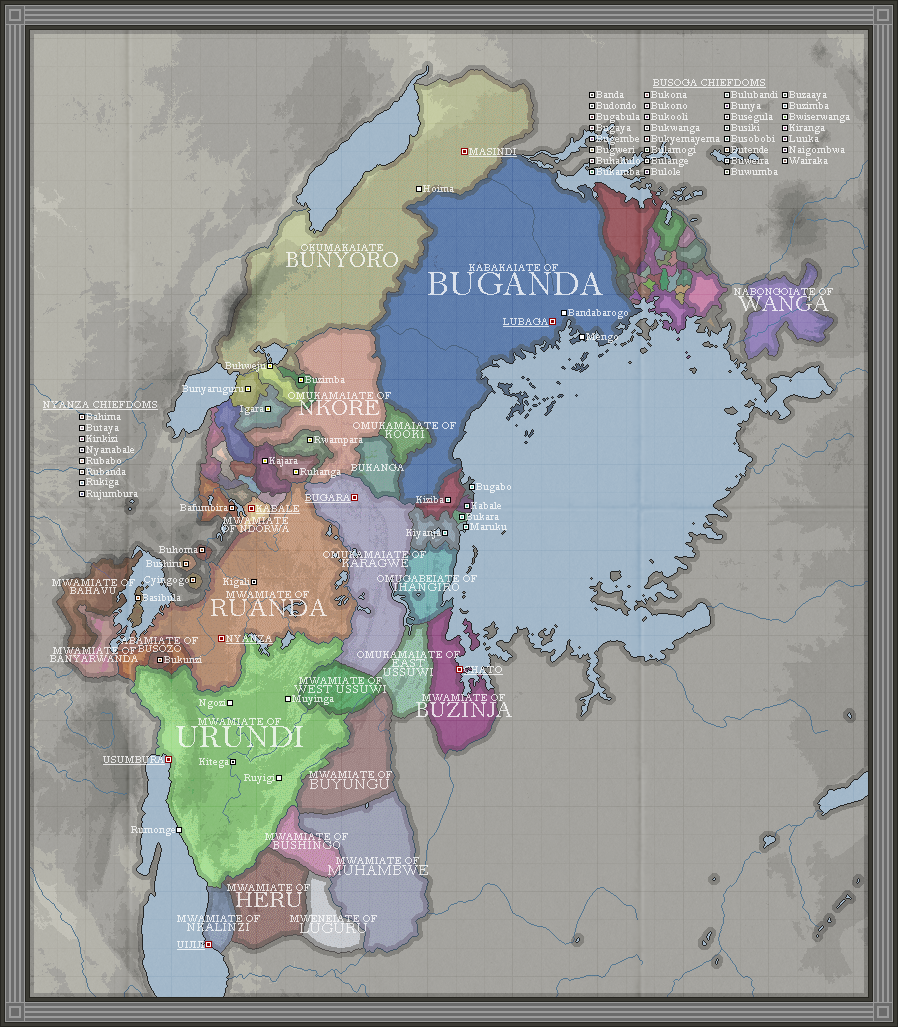
The kingdoms of the African Great Lakes, c. 1880. Rwanda is marked in orange.

In the 19th century, the African Great Lakes region was affected both by the expansionism of native kingdoms as well as the arrival of European colonial powers. In the Berlin Conference, much of Africa had been assigned to various European states without the knowledge or consent of Africans. As part of these negotiations, a region in eastern Africa was granted to the German Empire, whereas the large Congo Basin further west was transformed into the "Congo Free State", a private kingdom of Belgian King Leopold II. The latter ruthlesslessly and brutally exploited his territory with the aid of a colonial army, the so-called Force Publique. As the Europeans had little knowledge and next to no presence in the African Great Lakes region at the time, the exact borders between German lands and Leopold II's state initially remained unclear. One native state located within this assigned border region was Rwanda.

The Kingdom of Rwanda was an old, expansionist state led by a royal family and nobility of Tutsi ethnicity. The kingdom exploited a lower class of Hutu and Twa to fund its wars of conquest. Rwanda significantly grew in territory under King Kigeli IV Rwabugiri who conquered a series of smaller kingdoms and principalities. He strengthened the royal army by introducing a conscription system, with all adult men of his state being eligible to be drafted, trained with bows, javelins, swords, and shields, and then serving for several years in standing military units. To avoid a succession struggle after his death, Kigeli IV Rwabugiri also chose one of his adult sons, Mibambwe IV Rutarindwa, as a successor and appointed him co-regent in 1889. In accordance to Rwandan customs, a "Queen Mother" was traditionally also appointed when a new monarch took power. As Mibambwe IV Rutarindwa's mother was already dead, Kigeli IV Rwabugiri appointed his favorite wife, Kanjogera, as the Queen Mother for Mibambwe IV Rutarindwa. This was a controversial choice, as Kanjogera belonged to the Bega clan and also had an underage son who was theoretically eligible to succeed the throne; both of these traits should have made Kanjogera ineligible for the position as Queen Mother. In choosing her, Kigeli IV Rwabugiri ignored the traditions and his concerned advisors, possibly being motivated by his love for Kanjogera and/or a belief that he could appease the powerful Bega by connecting them with the new monarch without granting them full control.

Kigeli IV Rwabugiri unexpectedly died from illness in late 1895, either at the start or during a military expedition against the Bushi on the west side of Lake Kivu (modern-day eastern Democratic Republic of the Congo). Mibambwe IV Rutarindwa thus became the sole monarch, and the transfer of power initially appeared smooth. In reality, a Bega-led faction surrounding Queen Mother Kanjogera as well as her influential brothers Kabare and Ruhinankiko were already plotting a political takeover. As long as the young king commanded his powerful royal army, particularly the strong contingents led by loyal nobles such as Bisangwa, Mugugu, and Muhigirwa, he was fairly safe. Muhigirwa urged Mibambwe IV Rutarindwa to use his military strength to purge the Bega faction at court, but the king refused.

=== Sandrart's expedition ===
The first open challenges to Mibambwe IV Rutarindwa's regime did not come from within, however, but from the border regions. The death of Kigeli IV Rwabugiri triggered revolts in various regions, as conquered peoples and vassal rulers used the opportunity to break away from Rwandan control. Furthermore, a European-led expedition threatened the king's status: In 1895 and 1896, a major mutiny and rebellion by Force Publique soldiers broke out in eastern Congo. A number of expeditions were sent to deal with the insurgents, including a contingent under Lieutenant Constantin Sandrart. (Note: Historian Alison Des Forges mistakenly identified the Belgian officer at the Battle of Shangi as "Georges Sandrart". According to researcher Dantès Singiza, the Force Publique contingent at Shangi belonged to the columns of Lieutenants Long and Deffense.) He pursued the rebels, but eventually crossed the Ruzizi River into the Kingdom of Rwanda. With about 300 African soldiers and one small-caliber cannon under his command, Sandrart set up a fortified hill camp at Shangi on the shore of Lake Kivu. The officer then contacted the local notables, attempting to convince them to pledge allegiance to the Congo Free State. Sandrart may have been motivated by the still-unclear borders between the regional colonial territories. In an older agreement, the border between German East Africa and the Congo Free State had been delineated by a simple line which theoretically assigned much of southwestern Rwanda to the Congolese state. In 1895, Leopold II had again insisted on the validity of this agreement. In contrast, the German government had begun to favor a new border which respected the area's natural landmarks such as the Ruzizi River and claimed almost all of Rwanda for Germany.

Sandrart's actions attacked King Mibambwe IV Rutarindwa's authority, and had to be answered in some way. The Rwandan court was initially wary on the next actions, however, as its members were aware of the impact of European firepower. The Rwandans had gained some experiences with modern European weaponry when a small Rwandan military unit had attacked an armed expedition of German explorer Gustav Adolf von Götzen in 1894, and was defeated by the expedition's guns. As it had been only a minor action with few losses, the monarchy had lost little prestige due to Götzen's victory, but the Rwandan elite had developed a considerable respect for guns. The establishment of the Shangi camp thus led to a debate at the court, with some pointing to the "invincibility of Europeans". Rwangampuhwe, chief of the Abakeramihigo militia and a ritualist, argued against military action, favoring a diplomatic solution. Eventually, Kanjogera's brothers Kabare and Rutishereka convinced the court to send an army to expel Sandrart's force from Shangi, arguing that the Europeans had come as conquerors and could not be tolerated.

Historians differ regarding the strength of the Rwandan royal army sent against Shangi: According to historian Jan Vansina, it was four companies or "six hundred warriors in all", whereas researcher Phillip A. Cantrell and historian Alison Des Forges stated that the army consisted of "several thousand" warriors. Either way, the royal army included a large number of Mibambwe IV Rutarindwa's best and most loyal troops, drawn from the Ingangurarugo royal guard and Inyarugu battalion. Overall command of the army was granted to Prince Nshozamihigo, a son of Kigeli IV Rwabugiri, who was assisted by Bisangwa and Muhigirwa, both experienced commanders. Furthermore, Bisangwa was deemed to be relatively experienced against European weaponry, as he had also fought in the small clash with Götzen's expedition two years prior. According to researchers Frank Rusagara, Sarah Watkins, and Erin Jessee, the dispatch of the elite royalist troops alongside their royalist officers to Shangi was likely part of a conspiracy by the Bega faction; by provoking a conflict with the Belgians, the Bega faction ensured the "inevitable defeat" of Mibambwe IV Rutarindwa's best troops as well as his humiliation.

== Battle ==
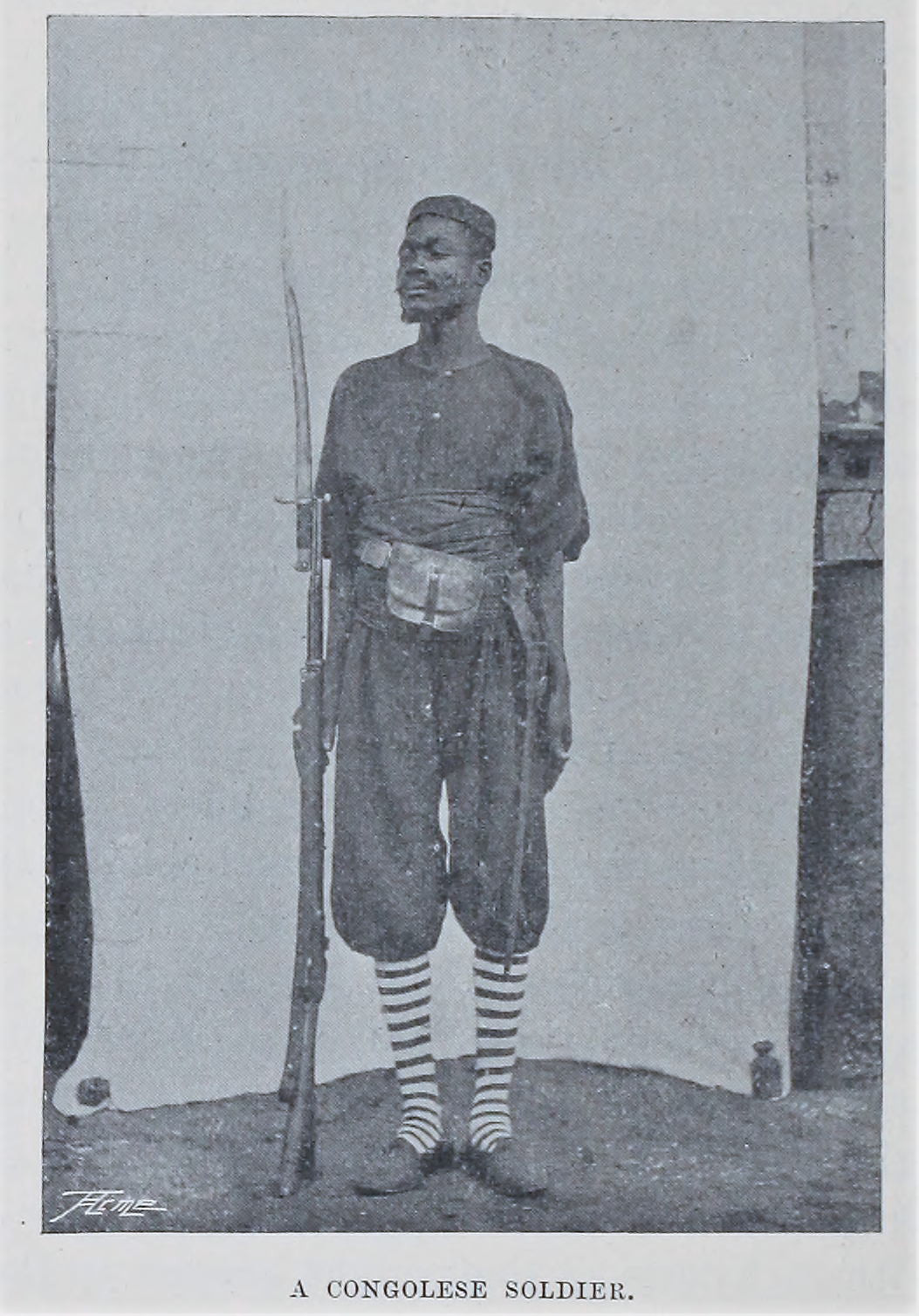
A Force Publique soldier photographed c. 1898. Armed with modern guns, the outnumbered Congolese troops inflicted heavy losses on the Rwandan army.

When they arrived at Shangi in July 1896, the Rwandans charged the camp with spears and bows in the morning. The first wave of attackers was formed by Bisangwa's personal elite Ibisumizi company and managed to surprise the defenders. Though this gave the Rwandans the "upper hand" for a short moment, the battle then drastically turned. Within minutes, the attackers were decimated by the gunfire of the Force Publique soldiers who had not just better weaponry but also an advantageous position. Shocked by the firepower, Prince Nshozamihigo immediately fled the battlefield. In contrast, Bisangwa and Muhigirwa remained on their posts. After the first attack's failure, Bisangwa reportedly sent a messenger to the royal court, stating "When one is defeated abroad, one returns to his own country; when one is beaten at home, where does one go then?" He then ordered two more assaults. The Rwandans only broke when Sandrart personally targeted and shot Bisangwa through the head during the third attack, whereupon the royal army retreated and largely dispersed. Several other Rwandan officers were also killed in the battle. Viewing further attacks as "suicidal", Muhigirwa led the remainder of his contingent back home to Nyaruguru.

The Rwandan defeat was crushing and demonstrated how much a European force outclassed the royal army. The one-sided nature of the clash was further emphasized by rumors and false tales which spread among the Rwandan population. For instance, one story claimed that Sandrart had not even risen from his chair during the battle and instead delegated his wife to stop the Rwandan attacks. Though such apocryphal tales were not rooted in reality, they further upplayed the magnitude of the royal army's defeat in the eyes of the people. When Prince Nshozamihigo returned to the court, he recommended that a diplomatic delegation be sent to the Shangi camp. Meanwhile, the Force Publique –alongside allied Congolese tribes– plundered the Cyangugu region after their victory.

== Aftermath ==
The battle was a political disaster for Mibambwe IV Rutarindwa. The previously high military reputation of the royal army was heavily damaged by the defeat. According to Des Forges, the Battle of Shangi signalled the "supremacy of European weapons over Rwandan ones and, by implication, European power over Rwandan power", easing the later German takeover. The loss of his important ally Bisangwa further weakened the political position of Mibambwe IV Rutarindwa. Furthermore, the defeat led to more widespread questions on Mibambwe IV Rutarindwa's leadership abilities. The Bega-led faction under Kanjogera exploited the situation, organizing the killings of several followers of the king, including Mugugu and Bisangwa's brother Sehene. In December 1896, the Bega under Kabare eventually launched the Rucunshu Coup, overthrowing Mibambwe IV Rutarindwa and driving him to suicide. In his place, Kanjogera's underage son Yuhi V Musinga was installed as a puppet ruler. Rwanda subsequently fell into a period of infighting and unrest.

News of the Battle of Shangi also reached the German military post at Lake Tanganyika to the south. The Belgian-Congolese incursion alarmed the local Schutztruppe officer Hans von Ramsay who considered Rwanda to be within German territory, and thus marched northward with a contingent of 120 armed carriers and 112 askari in January 1897. Reaching the Rwandan royal court in March 1897, Ramsay offered the monarchy aid against internal enemies as well as the Congo Free State, demanding a formal submission to Germany in exchange. Viewing this as a decent deal, Kanjogera's regime agreed, whereupon Ramsay gave a representative of Yuhi V Musinga a Schutzbrief –a diplomatic note of protection– as well as a German flag. This event is generally regarded as the start of the German colonial period in Rwanda. The court's gamble largely succeeded: Kanjogera's regime subsequently managed to cement its power through a series of purges as well as cooperation with the growing German colonial presence. A system of indirect rule was established, with the very limited German presence effectively controlling Rwanda through its still-autonomous monarchy. Furthermore, Rusagara concluded that the Battle of Shangi marked the start of the decline of the once-powerful Rwandan royal army, as it would subsequently wither and be gradually disempowered, replaced by the colonial troops of the new European overlords of Rwanda.

Meanwhile, a German officer informed Sandrart that his presence in Rwanda violated the terms of previous German-Belgian agreements. The development of internal problems in the Congo Basin ultimately forced the Congo Free State troops to peacefully abandon Shangi in late 1897, as an army of 5,000 Congolese rebels passed through the area, making the local military camps undefendable. The insurgents temporarily occupied the Shangi area before moving on. To secure the Rwandan border, the German Schutztruppe subsequently established its own military camp in the area. The Rwandan court attributed the retaking of Shangi to German influence, further cementing its alliance with the Germans. Disputes continued between Germany and the Congo Free State over the territory, but the "Shangi Problem" was eventually solved through further negotiations and the work of a border commission. Rwanda remained under German rule until World War I, when the region was conquered by Belgian Congo, the Congo Free State's successor polity. Constantin Sandrart's son, Georges Victor Sandrart, would eventually be appointed as Belgian representative or "Colonial Resident" of Rwanda.
