= Ngororero =

- Sector and town
- Location in Rwanda
- Coordinates: 1.85401°S 29.62976°E
- Country: Rwanda
- Province: Western Province
- District: Ngororero District
- City: Ngororero

Area
  - Sector and town: 58.5 km^{2} (22.6 sq mi)
- Elevation: 1,619 m (5,312 ft)

Population (2022 census)
  - Sector and town: 38,823
  - Density: 664/km^{2} (1,720/sq mi)
  - Urban: 9,106
- Climate: Aw

Ngororero is a sector and town in Rwanda.

== Location ==
Ngororero is located in Ngororero District, Western Province, in northwestern Rwanda. Its location is about 34 kilometres (21 mi), by road, north of Gitarama, the nearest large city. The town is located on the main road between Gitarama and Nkuli, another small town, about 40 kilometres (25 mi), further north of Ngororero. The coordinates of the town are:1° 51' 54.00"S, 29° 37' 30.00"E (Latitude:-1.8650; Longitude: 29.6250).

== Overview ==
Ngororero is a small town in Ngororero District, Rwanda. The town serves as the district headquarters. Despite its small size, it is served by three commercial banks, namely: (a) Banque Populaire du Rwanda SA (b) Unguka Microfinance Bank and (c) Bank of Kigali.

== Population ==
The current population of the sector of Ngororero is 38,823.

== Points of interest ==
The following points of interest lie within the town limits or close to the edges of town:

- The offices of Ngororero Town Council
- The headquarters of Ngororero District Administration
- Ngororero Central Market
- A branch of Banque Populaire du Rwanda SA
- A branch of Bank of Kigali
- A branch of Unguka Bank

== See also ==
- Kigali
- Provinces of Rwanda
- Districts of Rwanda
- List of banks in Rwanda

== The summary of District profile ==
Total Population: 407,940 Female : 53.7% Male: 46.3% Population Density : 493/ KM2 HHs: 97,435 Population in Poverty reduced from 69% (PDD: 2008) to :47.7% (EICV 5: 2018) Population in Extreme Poverty reduced from 40% (PDD: 2008) to 20.8% (EICV 5: 2018) % of HHs with access to electricity increased from 4% (PDD: 2012) to 40.5% (On-grid: 31.6% and Off-grid: 8.9% : 2020) % of population with access to clean water increased from 40% ( PDD: 2008) to 70% (2020) Number of Hospitals : 2 ( Kabaya and Muhororo) Number of Health Centers: 15 Number of Primary schools: 116 Number of Secondary schools: 49 Number of TVETs: 9 Number of Modern Markets: 6 Number of big Factories: 1 ( Rubaya Mountain Tea Factory ) National Park: 1 : Gishwati-Mukura National Park
