= Shangi, Rwanda =

Shangi
- Sector
- Location in Rwanda
- Coordinates: 2°24′12″S 29°0′21″E
- Country: Rwanda
- Admin. Province: Western Province
- District: Nyamasheke

Area
  - Total: 34.69 km^{2} (13.39 sq mi)

Population (2022 census)
  - Total: 28,064
- Climate: Aw

Shangi is a sector in Nyamasheke District in the Western Province, Rwanda. It is located at the southern shores of Lake Kivu.

== History ==
Kigeli IV Rwabugiri, ruler of the Kingdom of Rwanda, reportedly won a major victory over the Nkore people at Shangi during his last military operations (c. 1894/95).

In 1896, a Congo Free State expedition crossed the borders of the Kingdom of Rwanda. The "several hundred" Congolese-Belgian troops under Lieutenant Constantin Sandrart set up a fortified camp on a hill at Shangi, challenging the Rwandan control over the area. In resoponse, the Rwandan royal army attacked the camp in the Battle of Shangi, but was defeated. Despite this, the Congo Free State force peacefully withdrew in late 1897 due to internal problems. At this point, Rwanda had submitted to the German Empire, and the German Schutztruppe subsequently established its own military camp at Shangi to secure the border.

Disputes continued between Germany and the Congo Free State over the territory, but the "Shangi Problem" was eventually solved through further negotiations and the work of a border commission. The Belgians also set up a new position near Shangi. Shangi subsequently became a center for European exploration of the region, with Richard Kandt using it as a base.

In the Rwandan genocide of 1994, Shangi's church became a "death-trap", as many Tutsi gathered at the location for protection but were then massacred by Interahamwe militants.
