= Kabaya, Rwanda =

Kabaya
- Town and sector
- Location within Rwanda
- Coordinates: 1.74815°S 29.538226°E
- Country: Rwanda
- Province: Western Province
- District: Ngororero District

Area
  - Town and sector: 49.05 km^{2} (18.94 sq mi)

Population
  - Town and sector: 36,324
  - Density: 740.6/km^{2} (1,918/sq mi)
  - Urban: 9,036

Kabaya is a small town and sector in Ngororero District, Western Province in Rwanda, with a population of 36,324 and an area of 49.05 square kilometers.
