= Rutsiro District =

Coordinates: 1°55′S 29°19′E

- District
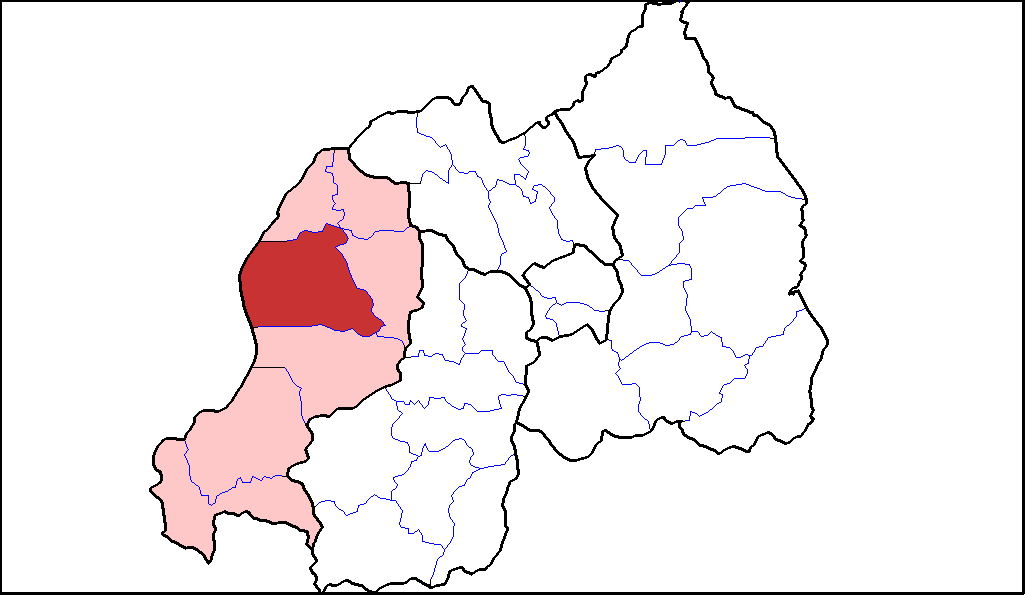
- Shown within Western Province and Rwanda
- Country: Rwanda
- Province: Western
- Capital: Gihango

Area
  - District: 1,159 km^{2} (447 sq mi)

Population (2022 census)
  - District: 369,180
  - Density: 318.5/km^{2} (825.0/sq mi)
  - Urban: 20,606
  - Rural: 348,574

Rutsiro(akarere) is one of seven districts making up the Western Province. Its headquarter is located in Gihango sector. It is located 150 km from Kigali. It has a population of 369,180 of which 60% are under 25. The population density is 320 inhabitants per km^{2} (2022).

== Administration ==
It is made up of 13 administrative Sectors, 62 Cells and 483 villages commonly known as "Imidugudu" covering a surface area of 1157.3 km^{2}.

== Geography ==
In the East: From North to South, the limit of the District of Rutsiro leaves the banks of rivers Bihongora and Nyanzo until the limit of Kavumu sector in Ngororero District

In the West: From the South to the North, the border of Rutsiro District is divides Rwanda from the Democratic Republic of Congo (DRC). Rutsiro begins from the border with Karongi District and continues up to the border that it shares with Rubavu District on Lake Kivu.

In the South: From the West to the East, Rutsiro shares a border with the Northern limits of Karongi District from the border between the Republic of Rwanda and the DRC where Rutsiro and Karongi meet on Lake Kivu to the Districts of Rutsiro, Ngororero and Karongi.

== Tourism ==
Gishwati - Mukura National Park is a protected reserve in the north-western part of Rwanda, near Lake Kivu.

Rutsiro hosts Urutare rw'Abakobwa lock meaning "the lock for girls". Alongside Lake Kivu, many small beaches appear.

== Sources ==
- "Districts of Rwanda". Statoids.
- Inzego.doc — Province, District and Sector information from MINALOC, the Rwanda ministry of local government.
