= Bigogwe =

- Town and sector
- Location within Rwanda
- Coordinates: 1.63155°S 29.41557°E
- Country: Rwanda
- Province: Western Province
- District: Nyabihu District

Area
  - Town and sector: 52.22 km^{2} (20.16 sq mi)

Population (2022 census)
  - Town and sector: 34,439
  - Density: 659.5/km^{2} (1,708/sq mi)
  - Urban: 25,398

Bigogwe is a town and sector in Nyabihu District, Western Province in Rwanda, with a population of 34,439 (2022 census) and an area of 52.22 square kilometers.
