= Mukamira =

- Town and sector
- Location in Rwanda
- Coordinates: 1.61446°S 29.50269°E
- Country: Rwanda
- Province: Western Province
- District: Nyabihu

Area
  - Town and sector: 38.57 km^{2} (14.89 sq mi)

Population (2022 census)
  - Town and sector: 33,013
  - Density: 855.9/km^{2} (2,217/sq mi)
  - Urban: 22,261

Mukamira is a town and sector in Western Province, Rwanda. The town is the capital of Nyabihu District.
