= Muganza =

- Town and sector
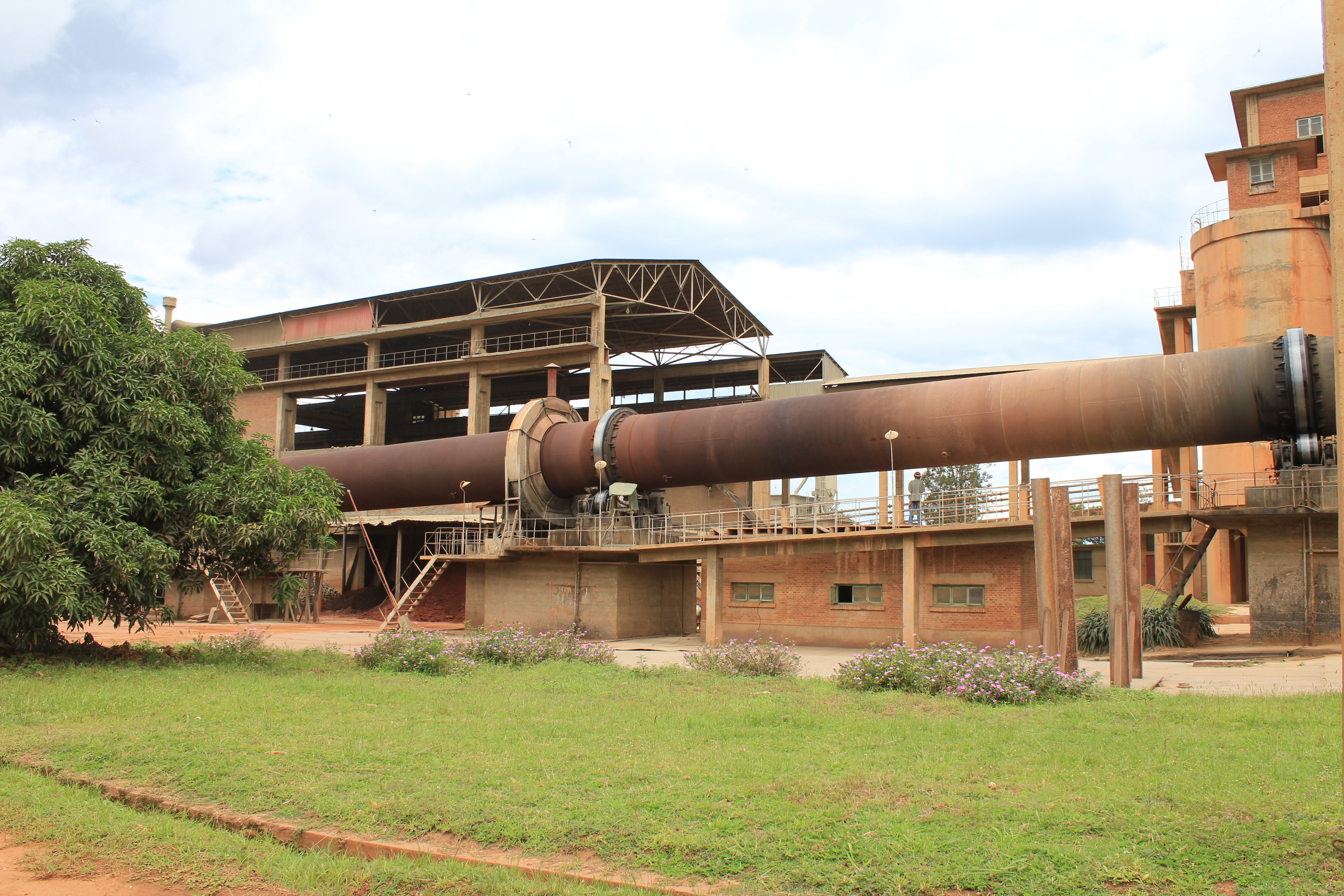
- Cimerwa Cement Limited in Muganza

- Location within Rwanda
- Coordinates: 2.64232°S 29.01296°E
- Country: Rwanda
- Province: Western Province
- District: Rusizi District

Area
  - Town and sector: 18.78 km^{2} (7.25 sq mi)

Population (2022 census)
  - Town and sector: 32,849
  - Density: 1,749/km^{2} (4,530/sq mi)
  - Urban: 32,421

Muganza is a town and sector in Rusizi District, Western Province in Rwanda, with a population of 32,421 (2022 census) and an area of 18.78 square kilometers.
