= Jean Bosco Ntibitura =

Rwandan politician

Governor of Western Province
- Incumbent
- Assumed office 23 November, 2024
- Preceded by: Lambert Dushimimana

Personal details
- Occupation: Politician

Jean Bosco Ntibitura is a Rwandan politician. On 23 November, 2024, he was appointed by Paul Kagame as governor of Western Province. He succeeded Lambert Dushimimana.

== Career ==
On 5 June, 2025, President Paul Kagame appointed him as Director General in charge of internal security of the National Intelligence and Security Services (NISS) succeeding Gasana Alfred.
