= Ngororero District =

Coordinates: 1°52′S 29°39′E

- District
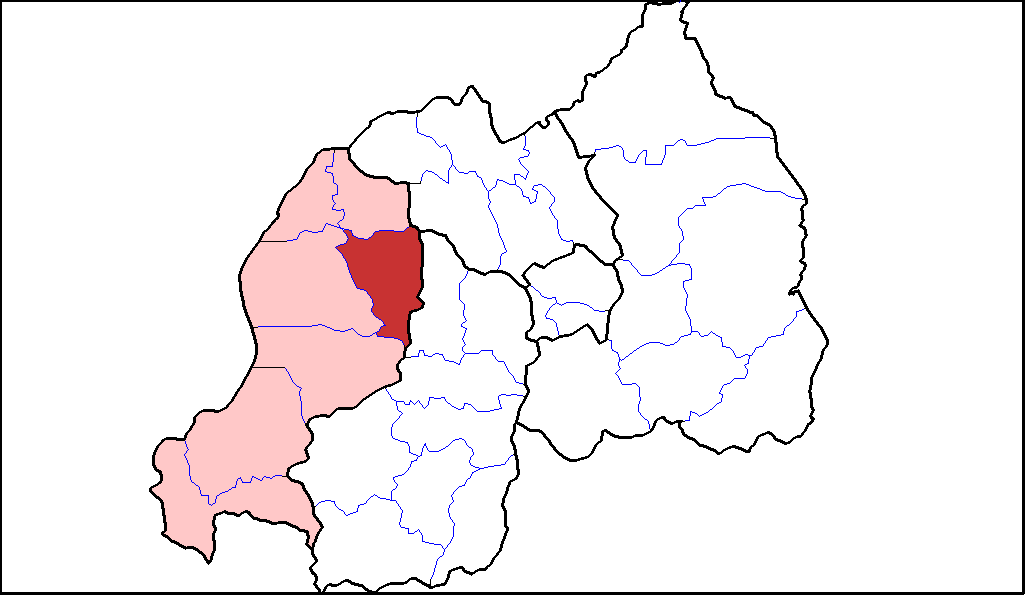
- Shown within Western Province and Rwanda
- Country: Rwanda
- Province: Western
- Capital: Ngororero

Area
  - District: 678.3 km^{2} (261.9 sq mi)

Population (2022 census)
  - District: 367,955
  - Density: 542.5/km^{2} (1,405/sq mi)
  - Urban: 18,142
- Website: http://www.ngororero.gov.rw/

Ngororero Districtis a district (akarere) in Western Province, Rwanda. Its capital is the town of Ngororero.

== Location ==
The district is one of the Seven (7) districts that comprise Rwanda's Western Province. It is bordered by Nyabihu District to the north, Gakenke District to the northwest, Rutsiro District to the west and Karongi District to the south; all in Western Province. Muhanga District in Southern Province, lies to the east of Ngororero District. The district's main town of Ngororero, lies about 59 kilometres (37 mi), by road Muhanga-Ngororero-Mukamira which links the District with Rubavu and Musanze Cities, northwest of Kigali, the capital of Rwanda and the largest city in that country. The coordinates of Ngororero District are:1° 52'S, 29° 39'E (Latitude:-1.866667; Longitude:29.650000).

== Sectors ==
Ngororero district is divided into 13 sectors (imirenge): Bwira, Gatumba, Hindiro, Kabaya, Kageyo, Kavumu, Matyazo, Muhanda, Muhororo, Ndaro, Ngororero, Nyange and Sovu.

== Population ==
In 2002, the population of Ngororero District was estimated at 282,209 people.

== See also ==
- Provinces of Rwanda
- Districts of Rwanda
