= Maison St Benoit =

Nunnery in Kigufi, Rwanda

General information
- Coordinates: 1°44′57″S 29°16′37″E

Maison St Benoit is a small Benedictine nunnery in Kigufi, Rwanda.

== Location ==
Kigufi is a village in Rwanda, in central Africa, adjacent to Lake Kivu, one of the great Rift Valley lakes. Kigufi is situated in the Western Province of Rwanda, in the Rubavu District, in the Nyamyumba Section, in the Kiraga Cell. It is located at the North end of Lake Kivu on one of a number of small promontories just south of Rubavu, the nearest significant town. This places the village close to Goma, at the border with the Democratic Republic of the Congo.

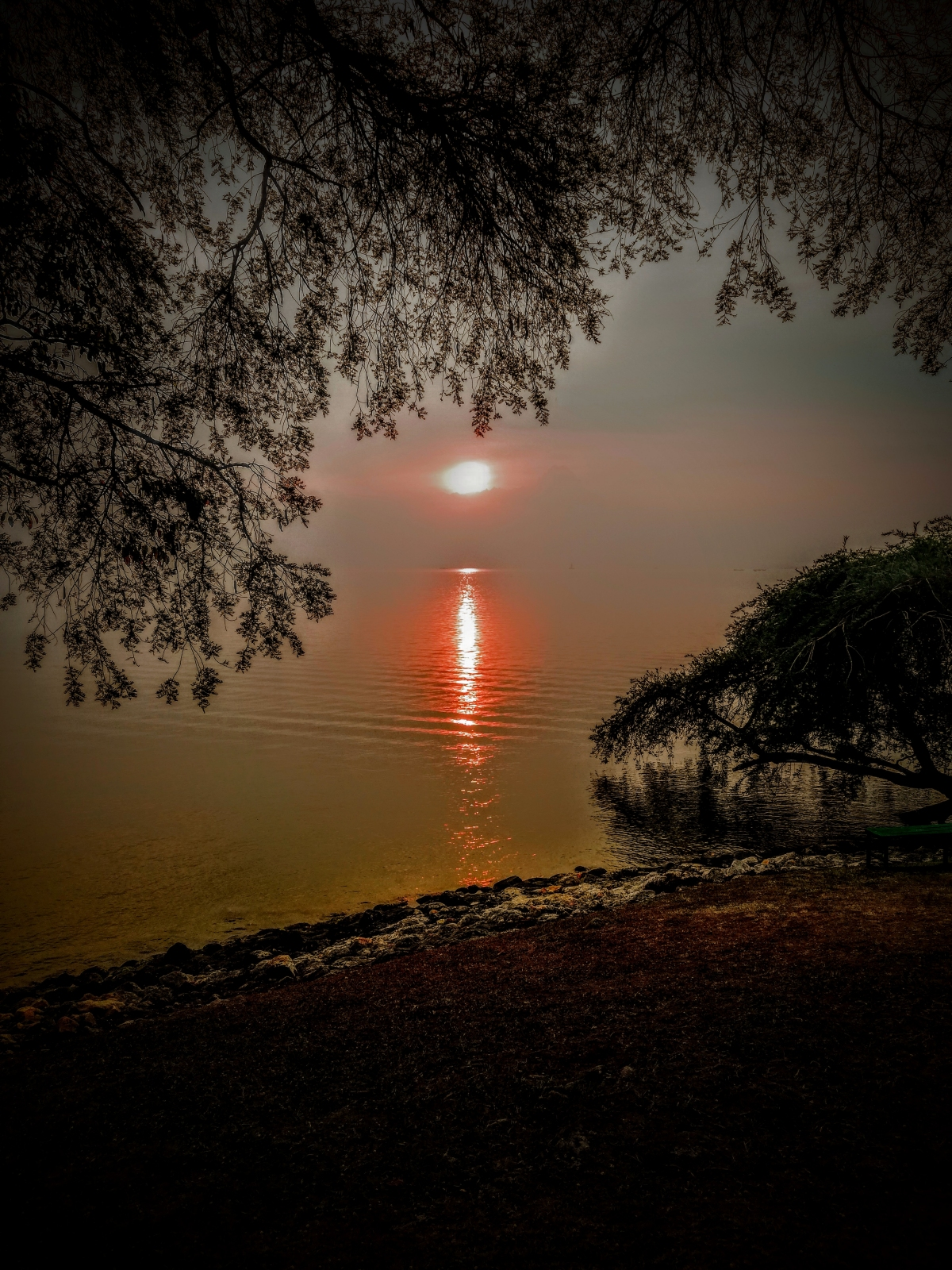
A sunset view of Lake Kivu taken from the Nunnery gardens

== History ==
During colonial times a British man named Jack Mat Wilson Poelaert established the premises and constructed the building that comprises the main facility for the Nunnery. He laid out gardens that include a range of good trees and have led to current descriptions of the Nunnery as "paradisaical green lakeshore grounds that support plenty of colourful birds and also offer good swimming". Poelaert gave the property to the Benedictine order in December 1970.

== The Nunnery today ==
Nowadays the Nuns of Saint Benedict live there praying and working as advised by Saint Benedict, who said: Ora et Labora. They operate a guest house with 30 rooms that make it "one of the best-value and most attractive places to stay in the Rubavu area". Sister Beata, one of the five nuns presently running the guest house, explains: "Nuns like to have visitors, to receive them is not a business it is a part of the mission. They want you to feel at home".

Visitors indicate that the sunset is a joy to behold and one feels a sense of peace once you reach Kagufi.
