= Nyamasheke District =

District in Rwanda

Coordinates: 2°22′S 29°09′E

- District
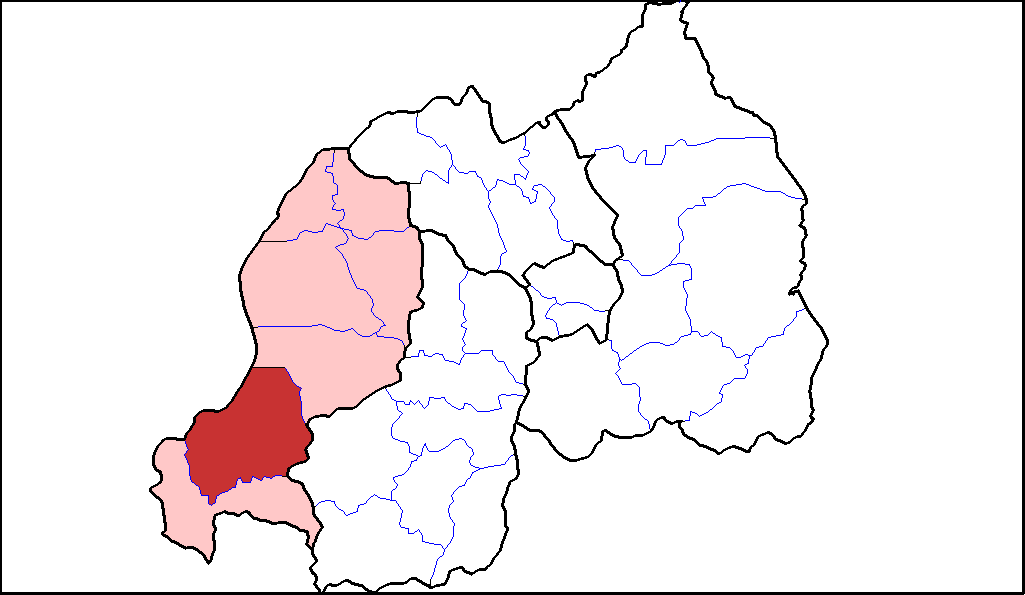
- Shown within Western Province and Rwanda
- Country: Rwanda
- Province: Western
- Capital: Kagano

Area
  - District: 1,175 km^{2} (454 sq mi)

Population (2022 census)
  - District: 434,221
  - Density: 369.5/km^{2} (957.1/sq mi)
  - Urban: 33,377
- Website: www.nyamasheke.gov.rw

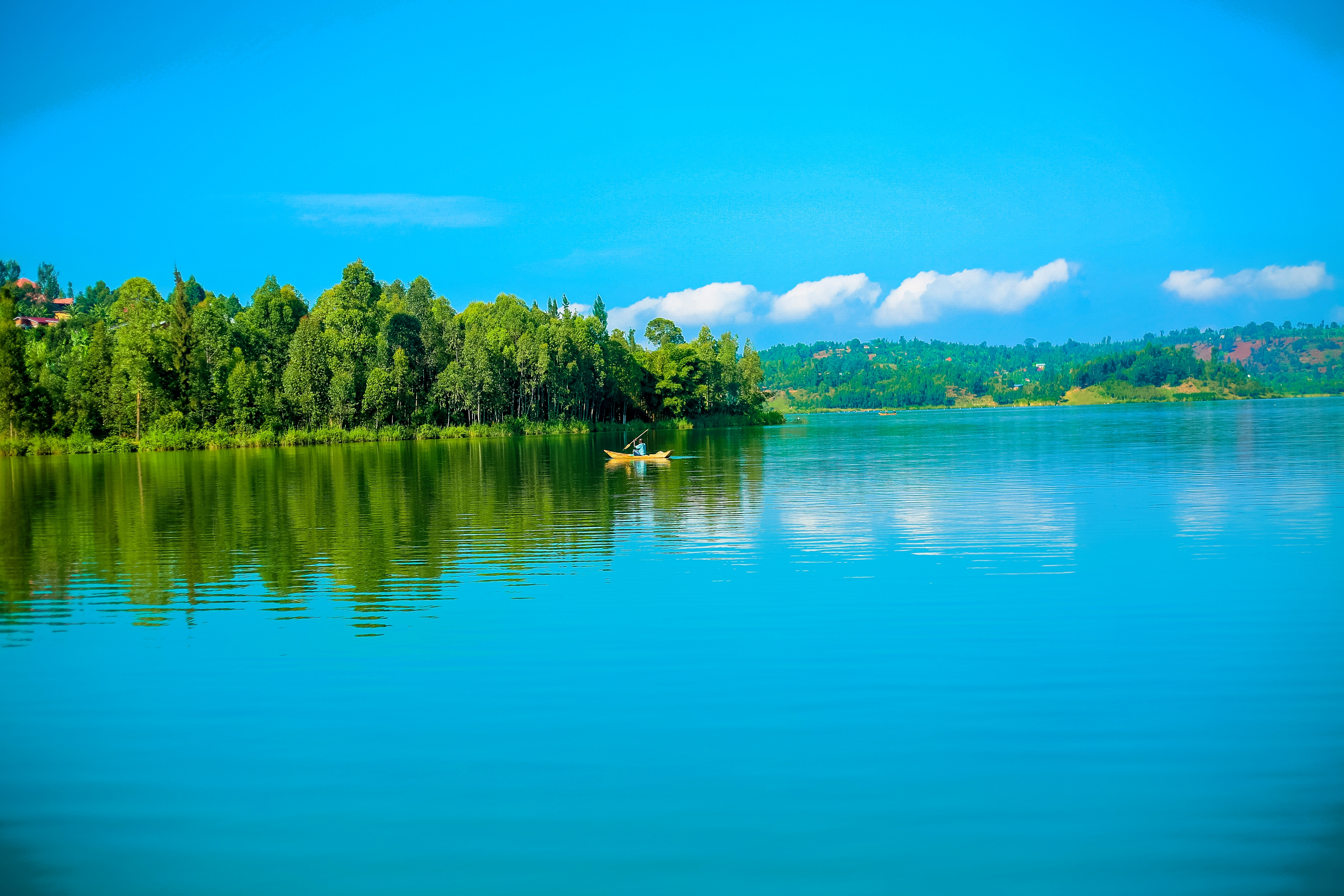
Nyamasheke district lies on shore of Lake Kivu

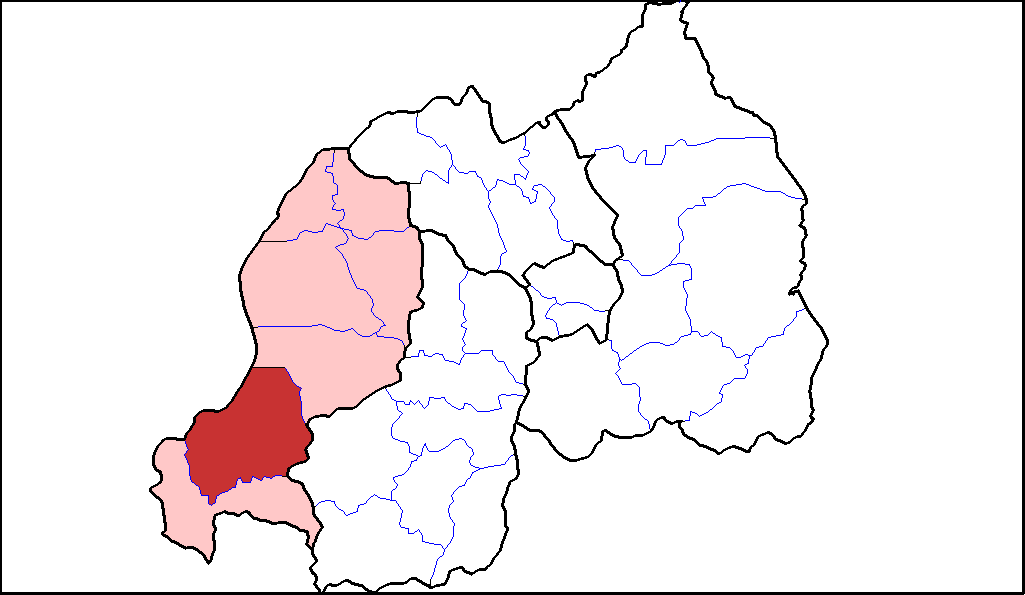
Nyamasheke District Map

Nyamashekeis a district (Akarere) in Western Province, Rwanda. Its capital town is Kagano. The district has 15 sectors, 68 cells, and 588 villages. The total area of the district is 1,175 km2 with a population density of 632 people /sq as of 2022 national census

== Geography ==
Nyamasheke district is divided into 15 sectors, 68 cells, and 588 villages. The fifteen sectors include Ruharambuga, Bushekeri, Bushenge, Cyato, Gihombo, Kagano, Kanjongo, Karambi, Karengera, Kirimbi, Macuba, Nyabitekeri, Mahembe, Rangiro, Shangi. Nyamasheke district borders Karongi District to the North, Nyamagabe District to the east, Rusizi District to the South and the Democratic Republic of Congo borders to the west. The district is strategically located between Lake Kivu and Nyungwe National Park, increasing its advantage of being a tourist destination and agricultural as economic activities.

== History ==
Nyamasheke was originally part of the colony of German East Africa, which included what are now Burundi, Rwanda and Tanganyika. Nyamasheke's Lake Kivu is the site of the first German colonial military post, founded in 1898 by Kapitan Berthe, a German Army officer. With missionaries, Shangi was chosen by the Germans for its strategic position on the Lake Kivu border with the Congo. Shangi; on January 20, 1900, the first mass was celebrated on the Rwandan territory by Father Alphonse Brard, Father Paul Barthelemy and Brother Anselme. In the post-colonial period, Nyamasheke was a part of Cyangugu prefecture. After the 1994 Genocide against Tutsi, the RPF led government made different administrative reforms that led to a new administrative district of Nyamasheke. In 1994, District saw considerable bloodshed during the Rwandan genocide.

== Recent events ==
In 2009, the prosecutor for the International Criminal Tribunal for Rwanda (ICTR) announced that it had evidence implicating former businessman Yussuf Munyakazi in the genocidal massacres that occurred in 1994 in Nyamasheke. Munyakazi, a former wealthy rice farmer in the Western Province, was charged with counts of genocide, or complicity in the alternative and extermination as a crime against humanity. On 30 June 2010, the ICTR found Yussuf Munyakazi guilty of genocide and extermination as a crime against humanity and sentenced him to 25 years' imprisonment. The ICTR specifically found that Munyakazi was a leader in massacres in Shangi sector on 29 April 1994, and Mibilizi sector on 30 April 1994 which resulted in the deaths of over 5,000 Tutsi.

After reports of harassment of genocide survivors in the district, several genocide survivors were murdered in Nyamasheke. In April 2009, Séraphine Uwankwera, a resident of Kagatamu cell, was killed between 7:45 and 8 pm on April 12 and dumped on the roadside in the Bushenge sector of Nyamasheke District. The deceased was murdered as she was coming from Gashirabwoba Genocide memorial site also in the Bushenge sector where she had gone to attend a Genocide commemoration ceremony where some of her family members who were killed are buried. Uwankwera was found lying in a pool of blood on April 13. A relative of Uwankwera stated that the murderers were Genocide suspects who wanted to prevent testimony conceal evidence attesting to their role in the 1994 genocide.

== Education ==
Nyamasheke District is home to different educational institutions. Kibogora Polytechnic is a university located in this district with extensive programs that attract local and national students to acquire higher education.

== Tourism ==
Nyamasheke district as it sandwiched between lake Kivu and Nyungwe forest. It possesses different attractions which people enjoy. They include Nyungwe canopy walk, canoeing, hiking and Kivu tours. It has the following hotels and guest houses that ease the tourist activities in this district. They include:

- Maravilla Kivu Eco Resort
- One&Only Nyungwe House
- Nyungwe Top View Hotel
- Ishara Beach Motel Ltd
