= Gisenyi Province =

Former province of Rwanda

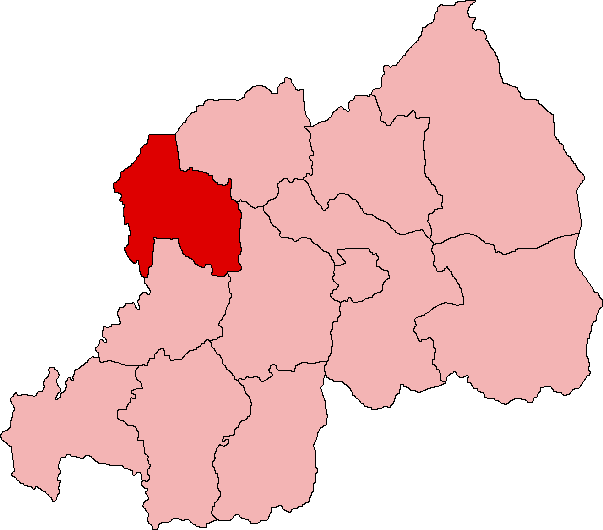
Map showing the former Gisenyi Province in Rwanda

Gisenyi Province was one of the 12 provinces of Rwanda prior to 2006. It is now part of the Western Province.

Gisenyi was the home province of Juvénal Habyarimana, and during his rule it provided "virtually all the leaders of the army and security service", and a disproportionate number of office holders for important government jobs. Together with neighboring Ruhengeri Province, Gisenyi was also blessed with disproportionate development funds and enrollment in higher education.

== Notable people ==
- Félicité Niyitegeka (1934–1994). Roman Catholic nun in charge of Centre Saint Pierre in Gisenyi
