= Nyabihu District =

Coordinates: 1°39′S 29°30′E

- District
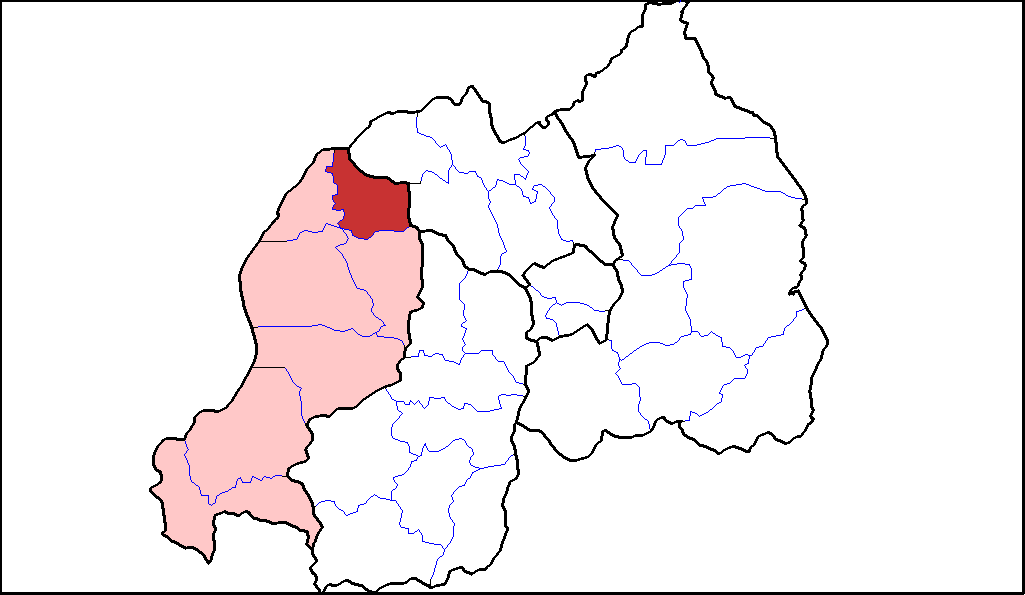
- Shown within Western Province and Rwanda
- Country: Rwanda
- Province: Western
- Capital: Mukamira

Area
  - District: 531.6 km^{2} (205.3 sq mi)

Population (2022 census)
  - District: 319,047
  - Density: 600.2/km^{2} (1,554/sq mi)
  - Urban: 78,027
  - Rural: 241,020

Nyabihu is a district (akarere) in Western Province, Rwanda. Its capital is Mukamira. Nyabihu District is divided into 12 sectors (imirenge): Bigogwe, Jenda, Jomba, Kabatwa, Karago, Kintobo, Mukamira, Muringa, Rambura, Rugera, Rurembo and Shyira.These sectors are themselves separated in 73 cells and 474 villages also called "imidugudu".

== Geography ==
The district It borders at the South with Ngororero District, at the West with the Rubavu District, at the East with the Gakenke District and at the North with the Musanze District and the Democratic Republic of the Congo. Despite heavy precipitations, the area really suffers from the lack of water sources given a poor hydrographical network. The flow of water comes from ephemeral streams of torrential nature, such as the Susa and its tributary streams. The very strong slope upstream explains the fact that they are torrential. The volcano sloping flanks have an average slope of more than 60%, over 2 200 m. When it rains, the water is raced down the flanks at high speed towards the piedmont, hauling everything in its way: animals, men, lava blocks, etc. The water from the numerous torrents racing down the slopes causes a lot of damages (flooding, sanding and sapping of banks). The water bodies are supposedly numerous and the water is abundant, but those bodies are approximately at a depth of 100 m. We suppose that they are located in old depression of the basement (synclines and pockmarks) covered by lava.

== Roads ==
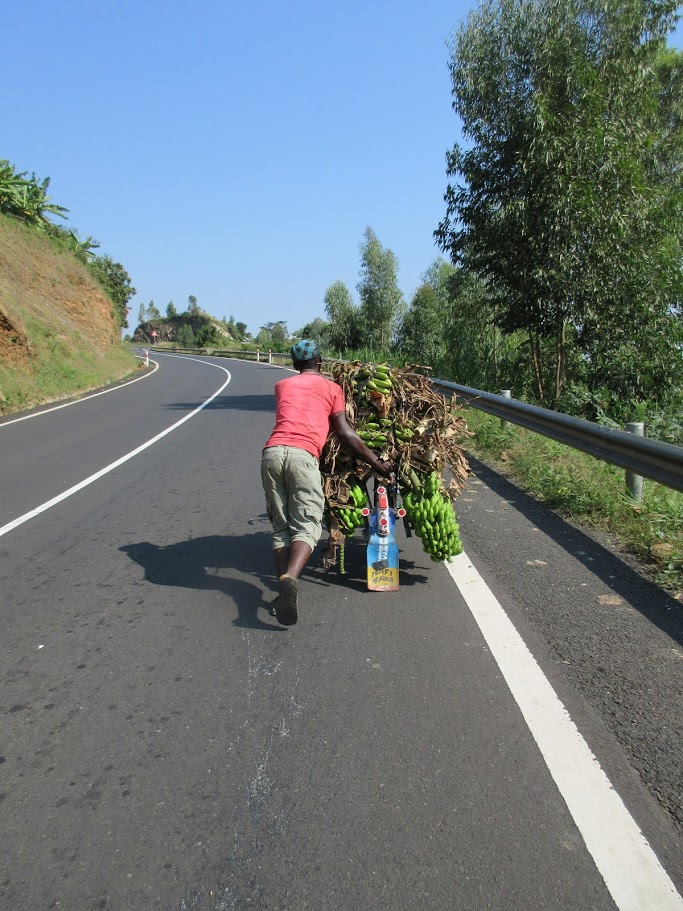
Bananas on bike in Rwanda-Road

In Nyabihu District roads condition varies from very poor to good. About 66.0% of the roads are very poor, 25.3% are poor and 8.2% in fair condition. Only 0.5% of the roads are in good condition. Most of these roads need to be rehabilitated while others require maintenance. The 2013 Development Plan of the District indicates that Nyabibu District has 290 km of roads of which 88% are dirt roads and 12% is paved. The district has access to three paved roads which are Kigali- Rubavu, Mukamira – Muhanga – Huye – Burundi or Huye- Rusizi, Mukamira – Ngororero – Muhanga – Karongi. It has also indicative feeder roads that are regularly in poor condition due to the high mountains and heavy regular rainfall. However, in some sectors, people walk more than 30 minutes to access the nearest road network. The poor quality and lack of roads connecting the supply area and the collection center is a major concern. During the rainy season, some of these roads become almost impracticable, while during dry season, there is too much dust that affects milk quality. In addition, the prices offered to farmers and ranchers by intermediate traders are insignificant and therefore decrease their income.

== Demography ==
In 2012, the Census on Population and Housing, the population of Nyabihu District is estimated at 295,580 inhabitants with 1% population growth, which is the lowest nationally. Nevertheless, the Nyabihu District has a very high density estimated at 558 inhabitants per square km according to the same source. Concerning the total fertility rate, Nyabihu District has an average rate of 4.9 which is high than the national average which is 4.6. The average age at the first marriage is 21.5 years for girls against 23 years for boys. 62.5% of households have children less than 7 years and 53.2% of households are headed by women. This situation involves significant investments in education sector and specific programs to support for women.

== Agriculture ==
In this district, economy is heavily dependent on subsistence agriculture, where the majority of households are smallholders. Approximately 74%, or 105,672 people in 143,000 of the population of the district, derive their income from the exploitation of the soil. However, there is a scarcity of land because; according EICV3, 50% of the population has an area less than 0.3 ha. This lack of land pushes farmers to work an average of 5 hours a day instead of at least 8 hours. This shows that there is unemployment among economically active people, especially among the youths. Agricultural food products, industrial and ornamental crops are grown extensively. For food, there are Irish potatoes, corn, beans, wheat and banana and vegetables as well. Irish potatoes, maize and beans are cultivated by 76.6% of households on average is 51,000 households. Irish potatoes are most cultivated with 83.7% followed by maize (74.3%) and beans (71.9%). Maize production represents 47.3% of the agricultural production in the district against 8.9% wheat.

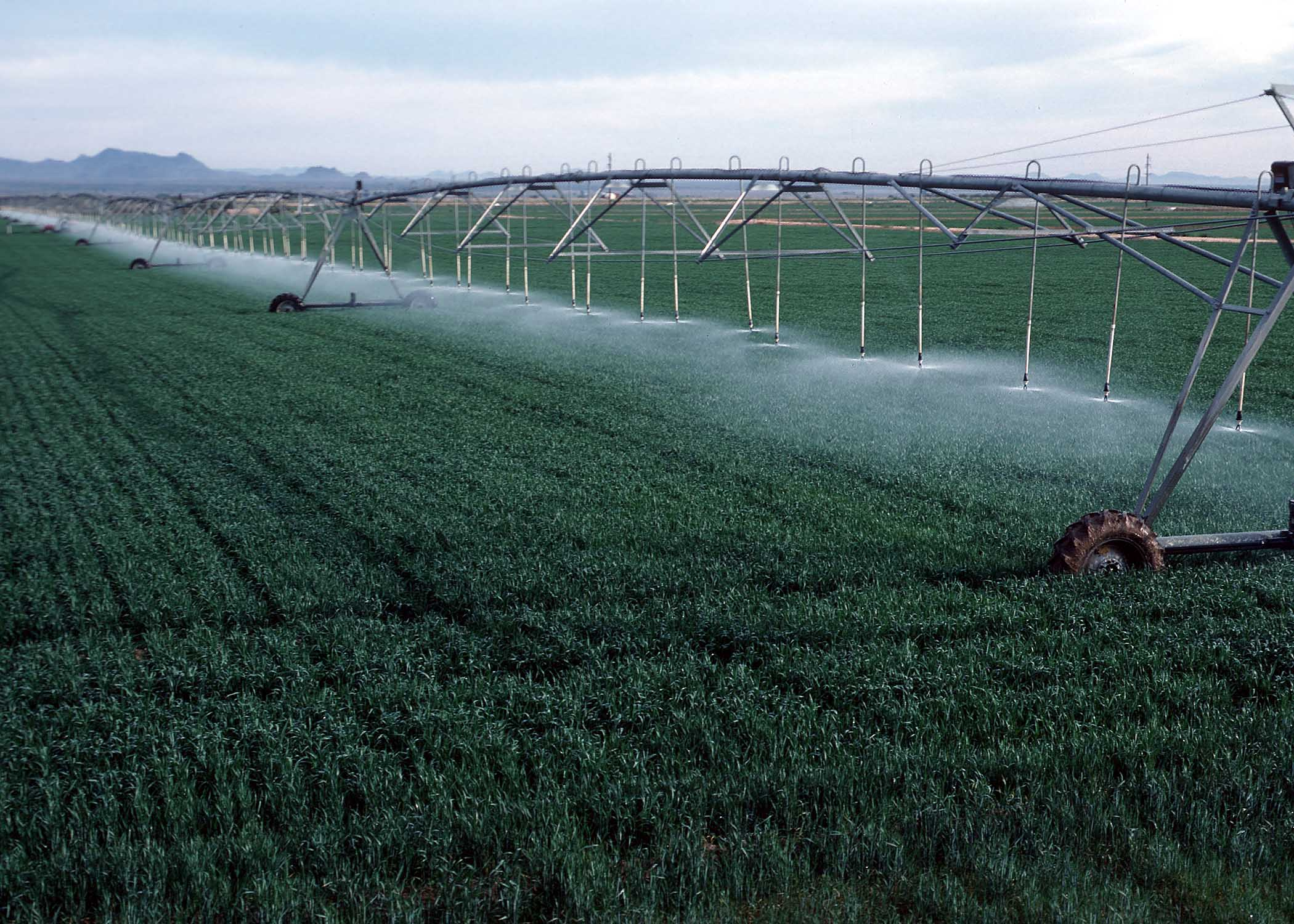
Irrigation

During the warm period, irrigation is needed. The district's economy should not only rely on agriculture but also on other services. In recent years, the Government of Rwanda has implemented several ambitious programmes to increase the productivity of the agriculture sector. The motivation behind these actions is reflected in the Ministry of Agriculture's vision: The current Local Economic Development (LED) activities are based on developing agriculture:

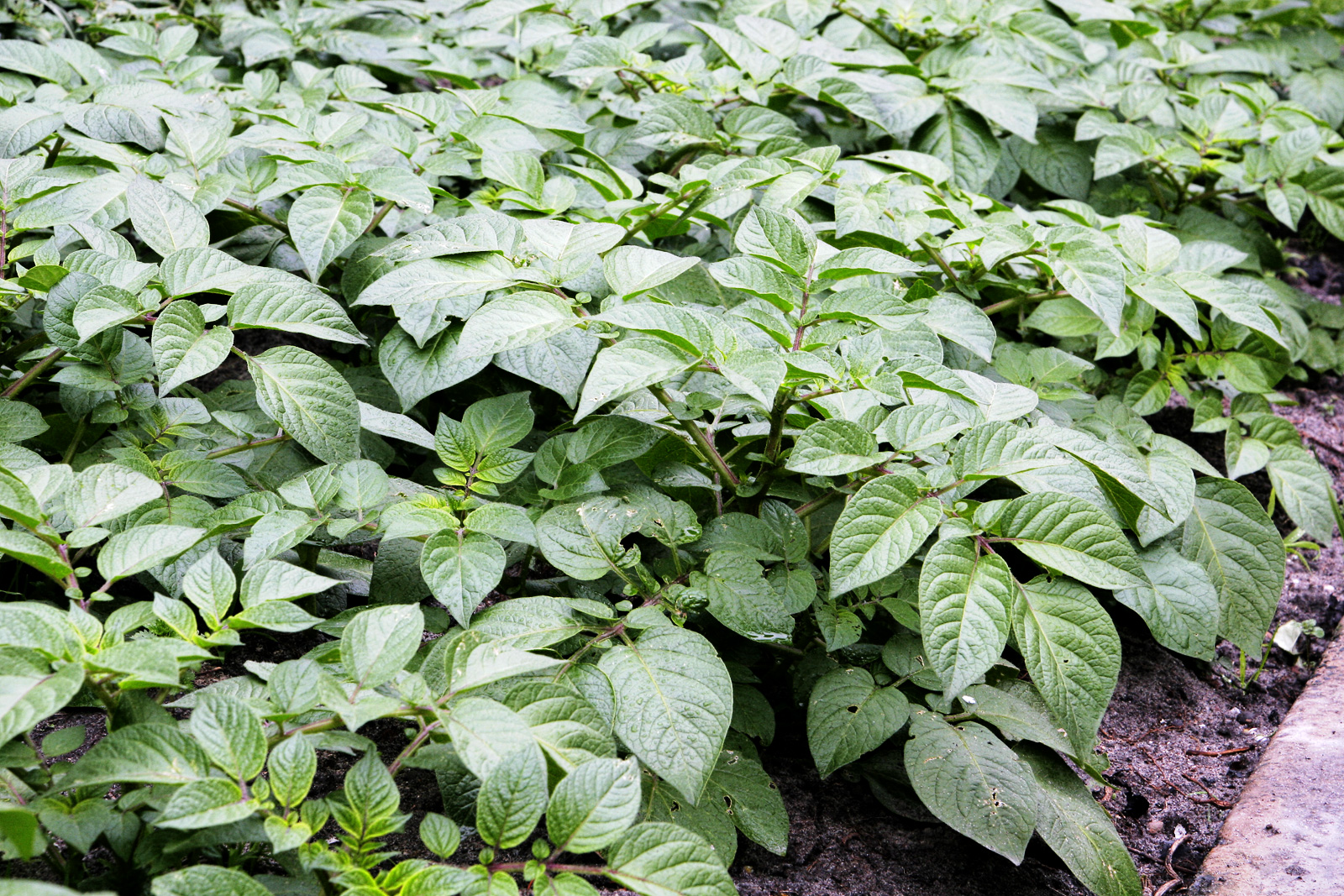
Potato plants

- Irish potatoes produced in Kabatwa, Jenda, Mukamira, Bigogwe, Rambura (3 cells), Karago (4 cells), Mulinga (2 cells), and Kintobo (3 cells)

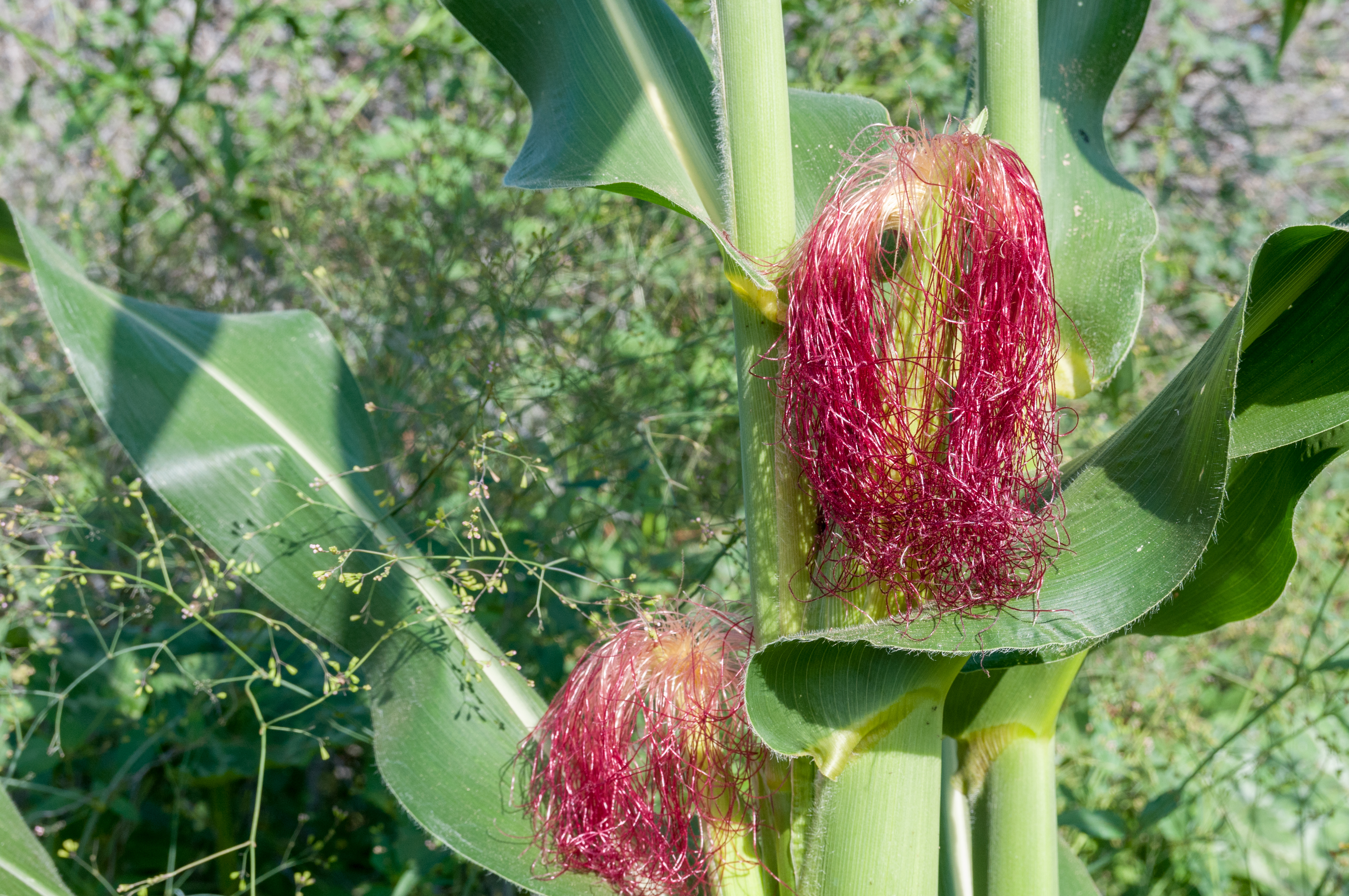
Maize

- Maize in Rugera, Shyira, Mulinga, Jomba, Rurembo, Bigogwe, Mukamira, Karago, Kintobo, Rambura and Jenda
- Vegetables: carrot in Jenda, Mukamira, Bigogwe and Karago: Cabadge in Jenda, Mukamira, Bigogwe and Rugera sectors
- Fruits: plum (Prunier du Japon) in Rambura, Mulinga, Bigigwe, Kabatwa, Karago, Jenda and Kintobo sectors
- Coffee: Rugera, Shyira, Jomba and Rurembo
- Patchuli in Rugera and Shyira
- Banana in Rugera and Shyira
- Tea: Mukamira, Karago, Mulinga, Rambura, Jomba and Jenda.
- Wheat: Jmoba, Mulinga, Rurembo, Kintobo and Karago.
- Pyrethrum: Kabatwa, Jenda, Bigogwe and Mukamira.

The district has a great agricultural potential, especially in the cultivation of potatoes, corn and wheat as well as vegetables of all kinds. However, there is no processing plant for these crops. The district wants to acquire a processing unit for potatoes as well as honey and milk collection centers. Crop storage silos are also needed for food security and price stability. The table below some crops like maize, Irish potatoes, ordinary beans, banana, climbing beans emerge as of high importance in Nyabihu District as far as crop share of harvested area in 2013 season is concerned.

== Development ==
Electrical energy availability and reliability in the Shyira Sector has been improved by the installation of the Rubagabaga 445 kW hydropower plant. This project won the African Power, Energy and Water Industry Awards in 2019 for the top Small Scale Sustainable Energy Project (Under 5MW).
