= Unguka Bank =

Bank of Rwanda

LOLC Unguka Finance PLC
- Company type: Private
- Industry: Banking
- Founded: 2005
- Headquarters: Kigali, Rwanda
- Key people: Justin Kagishiro chief executive officer
- Products: Loans, Electronic productss, savings, investments, mortgages, Remittances
- Revenue: ▲ Aftertax: US$387,000+ (RWF:230 million) (2010)
- Number of employees: 170
- Website: www.lolcunguka.com

LOLC Unguka Finance PLC, commonly known as Unguka Bank, is a microfinance institution in Rwanda. It is one of the MFI licensed by the National Bank of Rwanda, the country's banking regulator.

== Overview ==
As of June 2012, UBL was a small but growing financial service provider, whose total asset valuation and shareholders' equity were publicly unknown at this time. At that time, the bank had 556 shareholders and 14 branches.

== History ==
The institution was founded in 2005, as Unguka Microfinance Limited, by 215 investors with total capital of about US$538,400 (RWF:321.1 million). In 2008, the bank's processes were automated. In 2012, the institution transformed into a microfinance bank, following the issuance of a microfinance banking licence by the National Bank of Rwanda. The bank rebranded as Unguka Bank Limited.

== Ownership ==
The stock of Uguka Bank is privately owned by corporate and individual investors. At this time, the detailed shareholding in the bank is not publicly known. 35% shareholding is owned by Rural Impulse Fund II (RIF).

== See also ==
- List of banks in Rwanda
- Economy of Rwanda
