= Rusizi District =

Coordinates: 02°29′0″S 28°53′48″E

- District
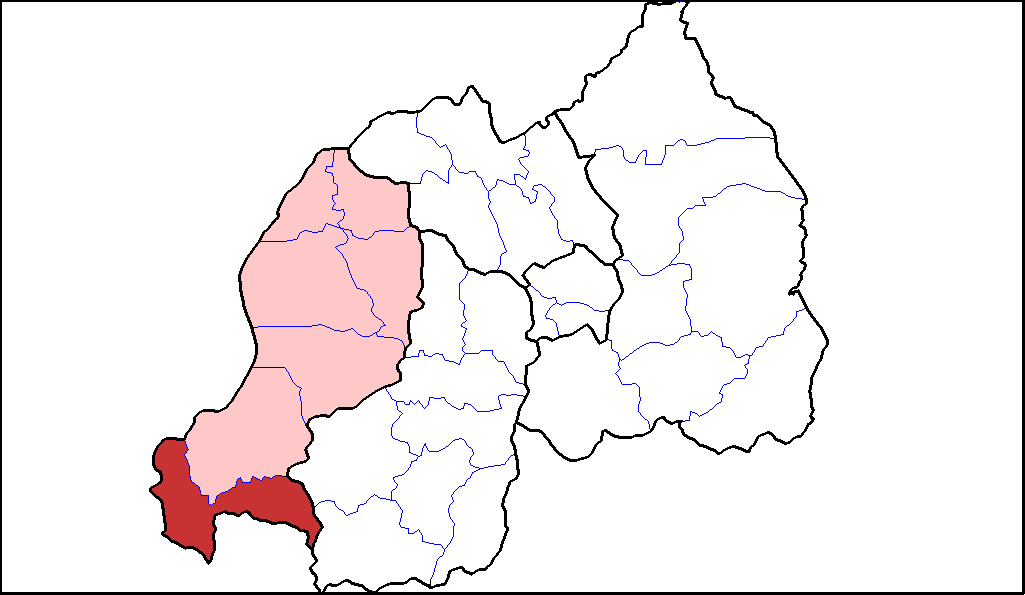
- Shown within Western Province and Rwanda
- Country: Rwanda
- Province: Western
- Capital: Kamembe

Area
  - District: 959 km^{2} (370 sq mi)

Population (2022 census)
  - District: 485,529
  - Density: 506/km^{2} (1,310/sq mi)
  - Urban: 162,165
  - Rural: 323,364

Rusizi is a district (akarere) in Western Province, Rwanda. Its capital is Kamembe, the major city of the Rwandan south-west and the district contains large parts of the former Cyangugu Province.

== Geography, flora and fauna ==
The district lies at the southern end of Lake Kivu, where it empties into the Rusizi River (after which the district is named). Rusizi's capital, Cyangugu, is one of the three major Rwandan lake ports of Lake Kivu (along with Kibuye and Gisenyi) and it contiguous with the much larger Congolese city of Bukavu. The district also contains the western half of Nyungwe Forest, a popular tourist destination, being one of the last remaining forest areas of Rwanda and home to chimpanzees and many other species of primate.

== Sectors ==
Rusizi district is divided into 18 sectors (imirenge): Bugarama, Butare, Bweyeye, Gikundamvura, Gashonga, Giheke, Gihundwe, Gitambi, Kamembe, Muganza, Mururu, Nkanka, Nkombo, Nkungu, Nyakabuye, Nyakarenzo, Nzahaha, Rwimbogo.Nkombo
