= Cyangugu Province =

Former province of Rwanda

Coordinates: 2.483°S 28.897°E

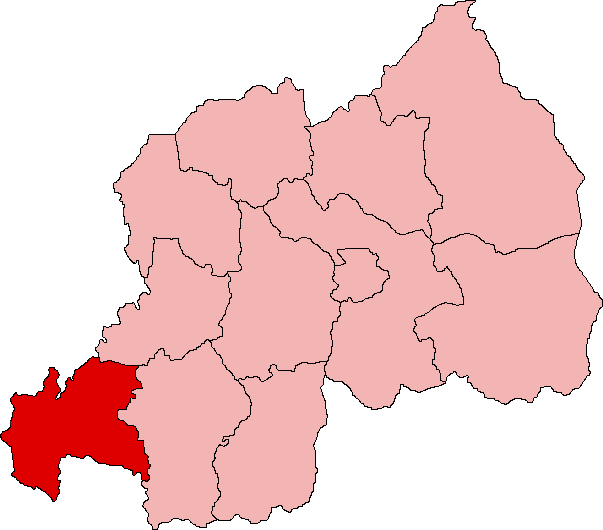
Map showing the former Cyangugu Province in Rwanda

Cyangugu Province was one of the 12 former provinces of Rwanda. In 2006, it became part of the Western Province. It bordered Bukavu, a town located in East of the Democratic Republic of Congo. Its provincial capital was Cyangugu.
