= Rubavu District =

Coordinates: 1°41′S 29°20′E

- District
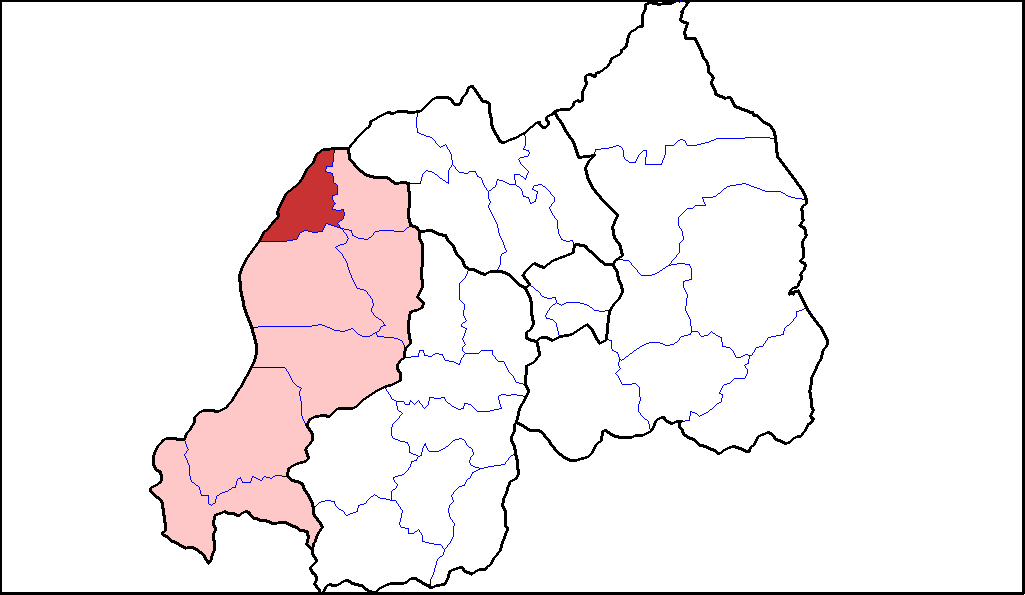
- Shown within Western Province and Rwanda
- Country: Rwanda
- Province: Western
- Capital: Gisenyi

Area
  - District: 388.4 km^{2} (150.0 sq mi)

Population (2022 census)
  - District: 546,683
  - Density: 1,408/km^{2} (3,645/sq mi)
  - Urban: 294,448
  - Rural: 252,235

Rubavu District is one of the seven districts (akarere) in Western Province, Rwanda, with a total surface area of 388.4 km^{2}. Its administrative capital is Gisenyi, a vibrant lakeside resort town and border city on Lake Kivu, directly across from Goma in the Democratic Republic of the Congo.

The Rubavu Urban area, which includes Gisenyi, Rugerero, and surrounding localities, had a population of 546,683 according to the 2022 census, making it the second most populous urban area in Rwanda.

== Geography ==
The district lies on the shores of Lake Kivu, around the city of Gisenyi, and just across the border from the Congolese city of Goma.

It is bordered in the east by Nyabihu District, west and north by the Democratic Republic of the Congo and south by Rutsiro district and is 154.7 km from the Rwandan capital Kigali. Its geographic location and related features such as Lake Kivu helps the district to be a business and tourism hub (especially through cross border trade with DRC).

Geography of the District Rainfall in Rubavu District varies between 1200 mm and 1500 mm per year. The Land of Northwest part of the District has a very rich soil, but shallow, volcanic ash and lava decomposed, while land in the south east has deep soils but poor, often acidic, sandy clay and leached by high erosion, It is also close to Mount Nyiragongo, an active volcano. On 2 May 2021, a new eruption started.

=== Congo Nile trail ===
Congo Nile is a 227 km trail along lake Kivu forming Kivu belt as it extends from Rubavu, continues through Rutsiro, then Karongi, up to Nyamasheke and ends at Rusizi District.

== Administration ==
Rubavu District is composed of 12 administrative sectors, 80 Cells and 525 Villages (Imidugudu). The 12 sectors (imirenge) are Bugeshi, Busasamana, Cyanzarwe, Gisenyi, Kanama, Kanzenze, Mudende, Nyakiliba, Nyamyumba, Nyundo, Rubavu and Rugerero.

== Demography ==
In 2012, the fourth Rwanda Population and Housing Census (PHC4), enumerated 403,662 residents in Rubavu District on a density of 1039 Inhabitants/Km2, where 51.7% of the total population are females and 48.3% are male. Total population in urban areas is 149,209 which makes 37% of the total district's population whereas 254,453 (63%) reside in rural areas. The district's population represents 3.8% of the total country's population and 16.3% of the Western Province population (2,471,239 inhabitants). The average house-hold size is 5.2 against 4.8 at national level, the population aged between 0–14 years old represented 43.8% and the population aged between 15 and 49 years old represented 47.8% while those above 50 years old represented 8.1%.

== See also ==
- Maison St Benoit
