= Cyangugu =

Cyangugu City
- City
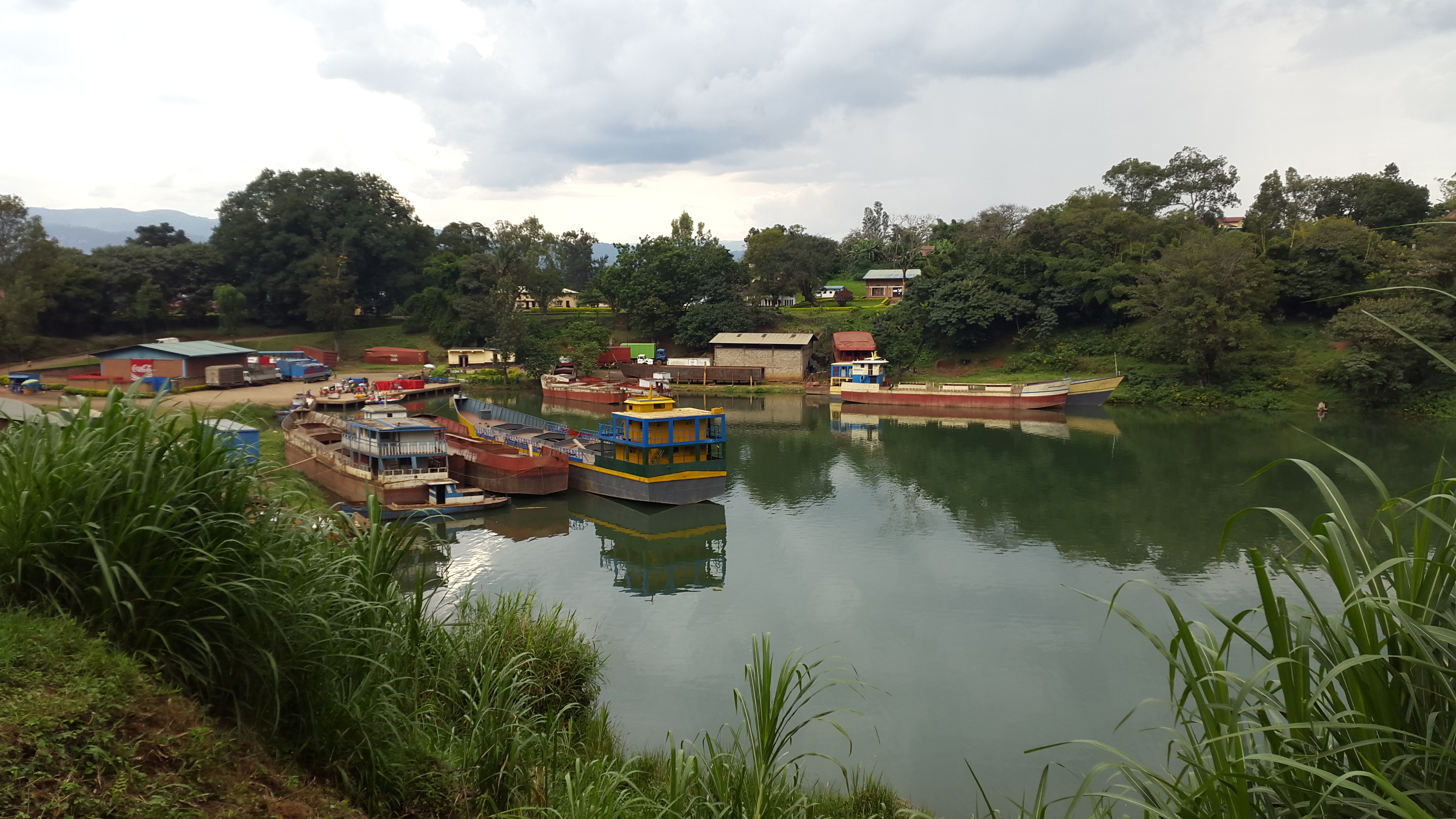

- Location in Rwanda
- Coordinates: 2°29′0″S 28°53′48″E
- Country: Rwanda
- Admin. Province: Western Province
- District: Rusizi

Population (2022 census)
  - Total: 43,866
- Climate: Aw

Cyangugu (formerly Shangugu) is a city and capital of the Rusizi District in Western Province, Rwanda. The city lies at the southern end of Lake Kivu, and is contiguous with Bukavu, Democratic Republic of the Congo, but separated from it by the Ruzizi River. Two bridges and a dam cross the river frontier.

The settlement has two main areas: Cyangugu itself is the low-density district on the lake shore, while Kamembe, the higher density industrial and transport centre is further inland and to the north. Kamembe Airport serves the city with flights 11 times a week to Kigali, operated by RwandAir.

The city lies near Nyungwe Forest, a popular tourist destination, being one of the last remaining forest areas of Rwanda and home to chimpanzees and many other species of primate.

In 2022 the city had a population of 43,866.

== Climate ==
Climate data for Cyangugu (Kamembe Airport) 1991-2020
Month	Jan	Feb	Mar	Apr	May	Jun	Jul	Aug	Sep	Oct	Nov	Dec	Year
Record high °C (°F)	30.5 (86.9)	32.3 (90.1)	30.0 (86.0)	29.0 (84.2)	29.2 (84.6)	29.0 (84.2)	30.6 (87.1)	31.6 (88.9)	31.5 (88.7)	31.0 (87.8)	29.7 (85.5)	29.5 (85.1)	32.3 (90.1)
Record low °C (°F)	11.5 (52.7)	11.0 (51.8)	8.5 (47.3)	11.5 (52.7)	12.0 (53.6)	11.6 (52.9)	11.3 (52.3)	12.0 (53.6)	11.0 (51.8)	11.5 (52.7)	11.5 (52.7)	11.5 (52.7)	8.5 (47.3)
Average precipitation mm (inches)	143.6 (5.65)	128.8 (5.07)	164.8 (6.49)	141.3 (5.56)	95.2 (3.75)	33.8 (1.33)	14.8 (0.58)	35.2 (1.39)	108.4 (4.27)	155.4 (6.12)	161.3 (6.35)	144.4 (5.69)	1,326.9 (52.24)
Average precipitation days (≥ 1.0 mm)	17.6	14.4	18.4	17.4	11.7	3.2	1.3	4.2	13.5	19.7	21.2	18.5	161.1
Source: NOAA
