= Western Province, Rwanda =

Province of Rwanda

Western Province
- Province
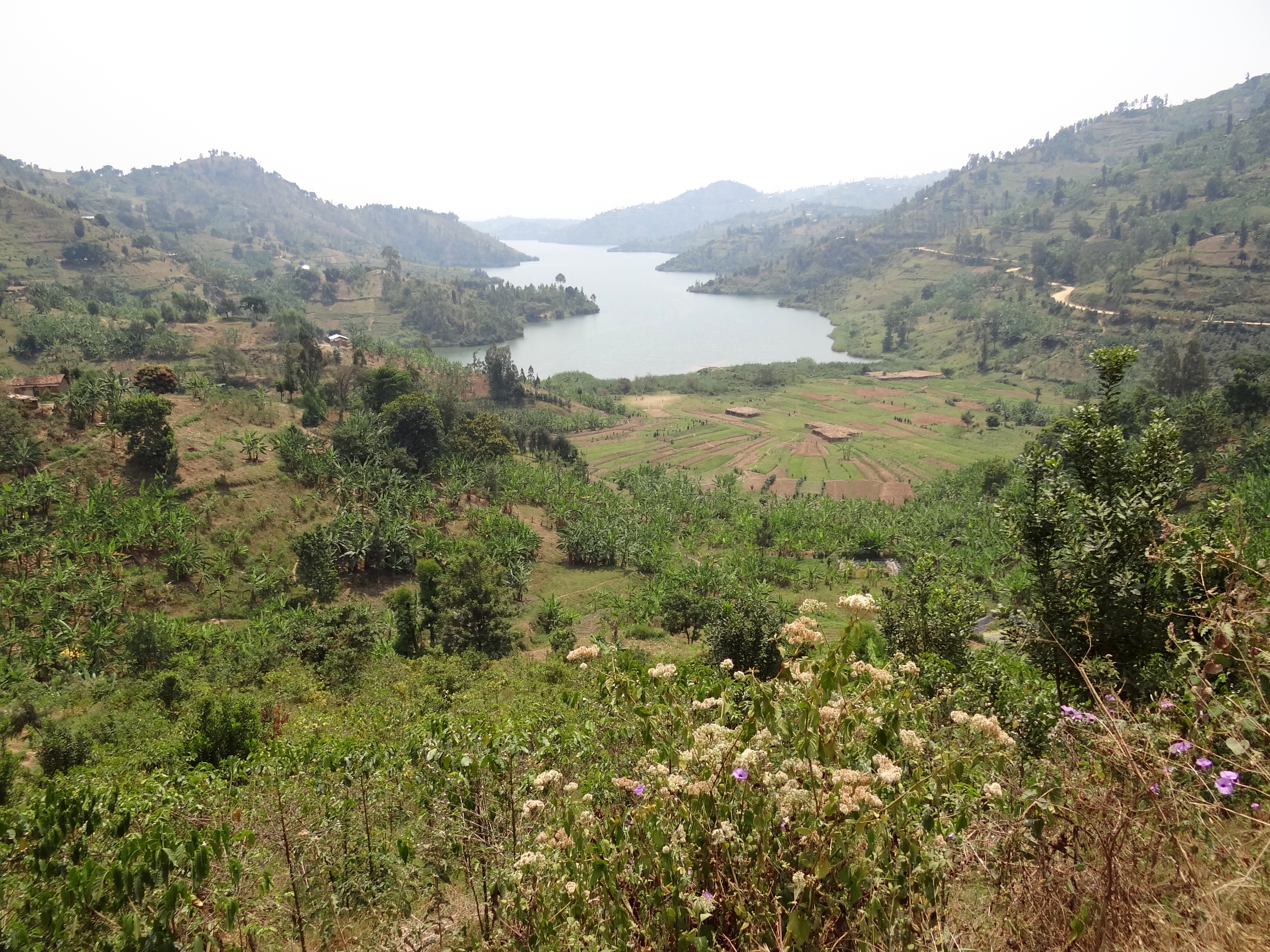
- Lake Kivu

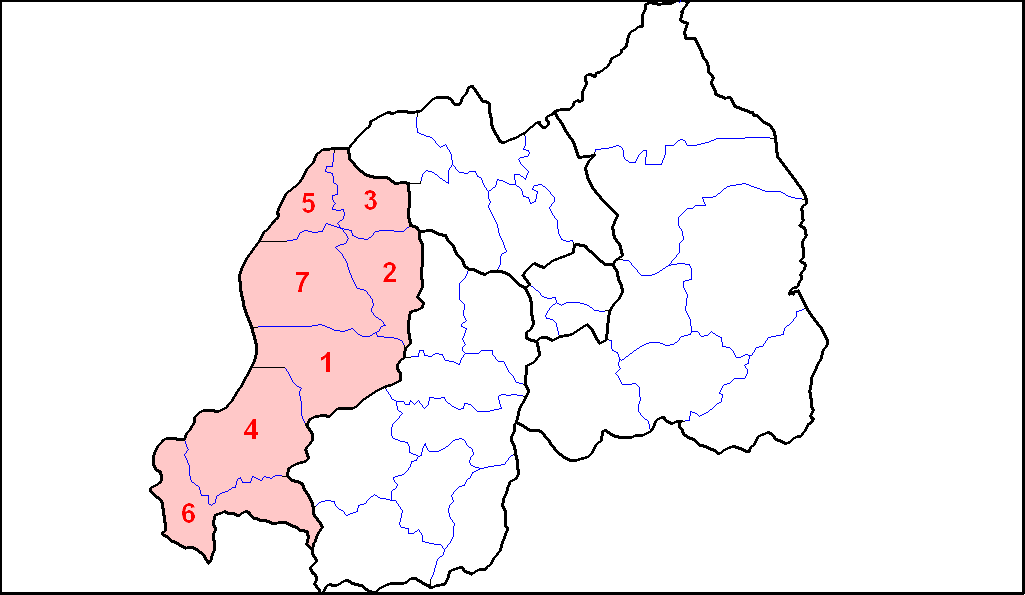
- Coordinates: 2°22′30″S 29°12′35″E
- Country: Rwanda
- Formed: 2006
- Capital: Kibuye
- Districts: List: Karongi; Ngororero; Nyabihu; Nyamasheke; Rubavu; Rusizi; Rutsiro

Government
  - Governor: Jean Bosco Ntibitura

Area
  - Province: 5,882 km^{2} (2,271 sq mi)

Population (2022 census)
  - Province: 2,896,484
  - Density: 492.4/km^{2} (1,275/sq mi)
  - Urban: 640,307
  - Rural: 2,256,177
- Time zone: UTC+02:00 (CAT)
- ISO 3166 code: RW-04
- Other settlements: Gisenyi, Cyangugu
- HDI (2023): 0.565 medium · 3rd of 5
- Website: www.westernprovince.gov.rw

Western Province (Kinyarwanda: Intara y'Iburengerazuba; French: Province de l'Ouest; Dutch: West-provincie) is one of Rwanda's five provinces. It was created in early January 2006 as part of a government decentralization program that re-organized the country's local government structures.

Western Province comprises the former provinces of Cyangugu, Gisenyi, Kibuye, and a small portion of Ruhengeri. It is divided into the districts of Karongi, Nyabihu, Rubavu, Rusizi, Ngororero, Nyamasheke, and Rutsiro. The capital city of Western Province is Kibuye.

Religion in Western Province (2012 Census)
1. Roman Catholic (35.0%)
2. Protestant (43.9%)
3. Seventh-day Adventist (14.8%)
4. Muslim (1.50%)
5. Jehovah Witness (0.70%)
6. No Religion (2.50%)
7. Other (0.30%)
8. Not Stated (1.40%)
