= 2023 African Great Lakes floods =

Disaster in DRC, Rwanda & Uganda in 2023

The 2023 African Great Lakes floods are floods in April and May 2023 that have killed hundreds of people in the Democratic Republic of the Congo, Rwanda and Uganda.

== Background. ==
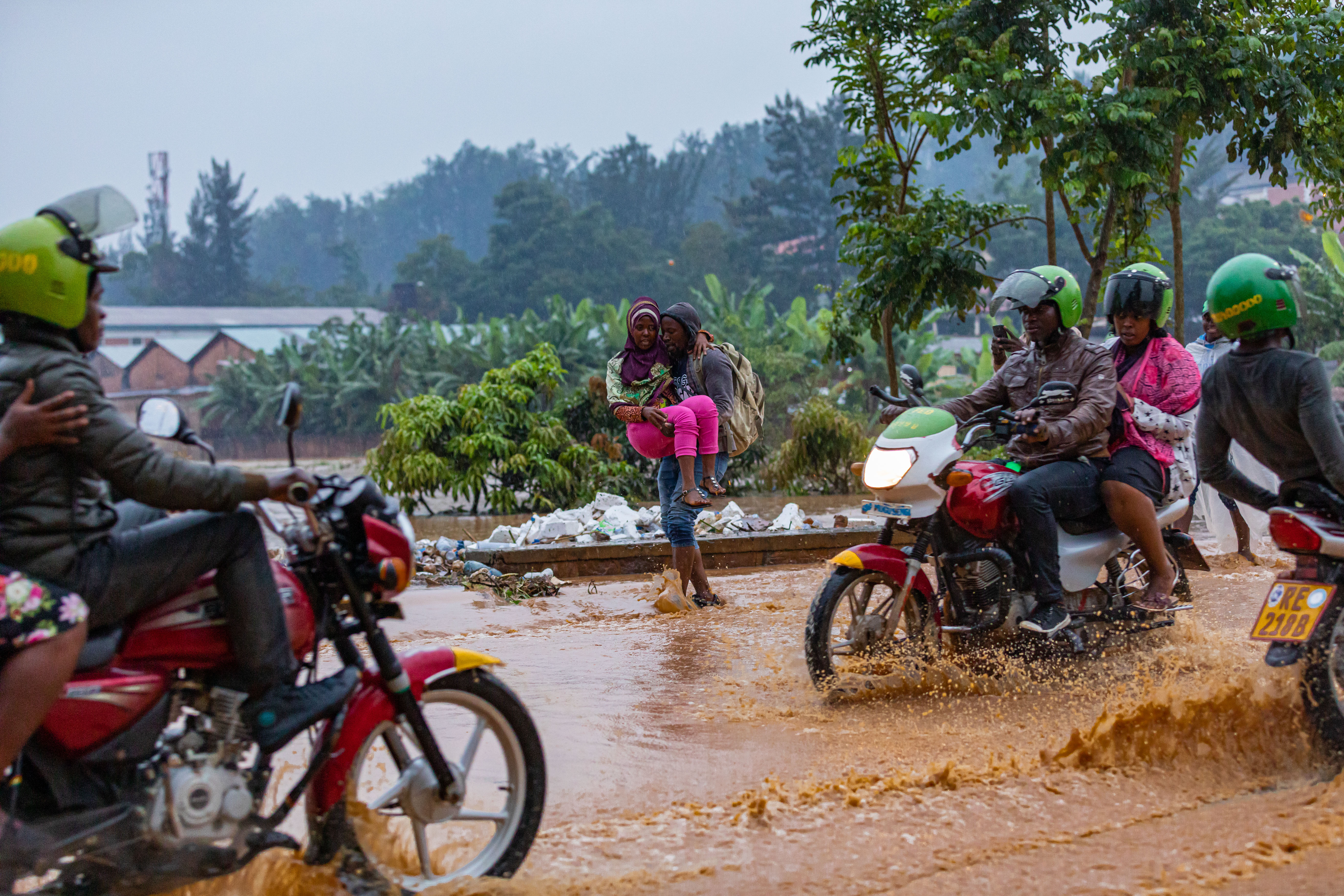
Pedestrians and motorists risk their lives to transport passengers in a flooded road in Kigali on 28 January 2020

Frequent heavy rains causing damage and casualties between March and May are common in East Africa – in May 2020 around 80 people were killed by floods in Rwanda. Floods and droughts have increased in Rwanda over a 30-year period. Rwanda's weather authority attributes the unusual rainfall patterns to climate change.

In 2023, several rounds of heavy rain saturated the ground, increasing the likelihood of flooding. Between January and April 2023, the Ministry of Emergency Management reported that weather-related disasters caused 60 fatalities, destroyed over 1,205 homes and damaged 5,000 acres of land across Rwanda. On 2 May, the Rwanda Meteorology Agency predicted above-average forecast rainfall for the next 10 days.

Uganda also experienced heavy rain beginning in March, which caused landslides that destroyed homes and displaced hundreds of people.

== Democratic Republic of the Congo ==
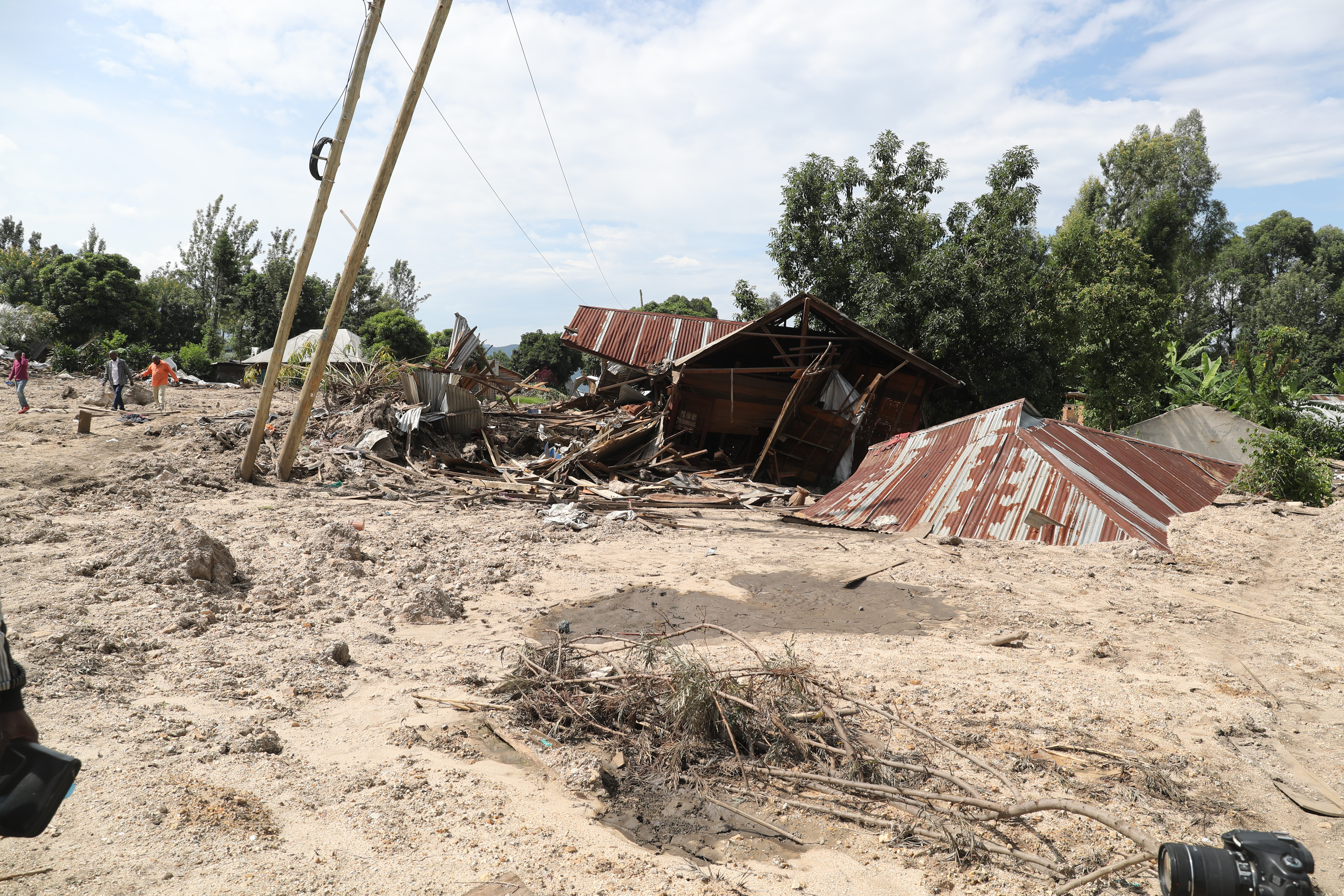
Kalehe floods 2023 South Kivu, DRC: The Special Representative of the United Nations Secretary General in the DRC Bintou Keita was in Kalehe in South Kivu on 18 May 2023, where a natural disaster claimed the lives of several people on 4 May 2023. She was accompanied by the MONUSCO Police commissioner, the Head of office of MONUSCO in South Kivu as well as senior leadership of other UN agencies in the DRC. She visited the scene of the incident and met with local authorities and survivors. Photo MONUSCO/Michael Ali

At least 440 people were killed and over 2,500 others were left missing by floods in the villages of Bushushu and Nyamukubi in South Kivu, Democratic Republic of the Congo since 5 May. In response to the flooding, President of the Democratic Republic of the Congo Félix Tshisekedi announced a national day of mourning for 8 May. Two landslides hit North Kivu Province, killing ten people in Lubero and at least six people at the Songambele mine, and leaving dozens of miners missing. 100 workers were at the mine at the time of the landslide.

== Rwanda ==
2023 Rwanda floods
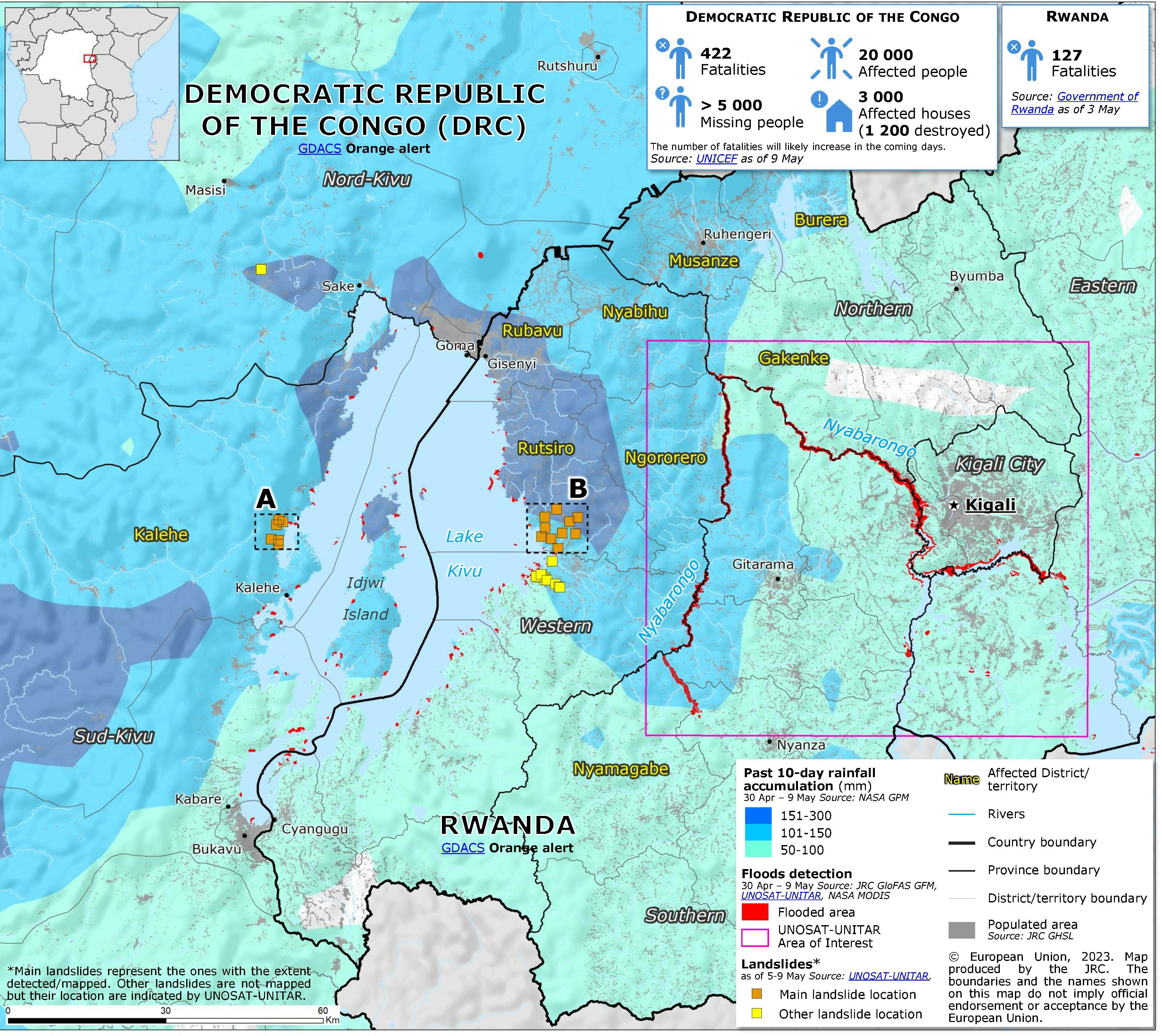
- ECDM 20230510 FL DRC Rwanda (cropped main)
- Date: April–May 2023
- Location: north-western Rwanda
- Deaths: 130 individuals as of May 3, 2023

The 2023 Rwanda floods occurred in April and May 2023. Heavy rain caused flooding and landslides in north-western Rwanda. In late April and early May, the Rwanda Metrology Agency predicted rainfall between 50mm and 200mm across the country within the first 10 days of May. In the north-western region, heavy rain ranging from 175mm to 200mm was anticipated.

Particularly heavy rain started around 16:00 UTC (6 p.m. local time) on 2 May 2023 and continued throughout the night, killing at least 135 people. Landslides also caused roads to be closed on 2 May. At least one person was missing, 110 people were injured and 20,000 people were displaced. The Sebeya River burst its banks. The most affected areas in Rwanda were Rutsiro, Nyabihu, Rubavu, and Ngororero. The Karongi district was also affected, with forecasts indicating that Rurindo, Gakenke and Gicumbi Districts were also likely to experience similarly heavy rains in the following days. According to François Habitegeko, the governor of Rwanda's Western Province, people were crushed by the collapse of several houses; landslides made the main roads in the area impassable and flooded fields. Most of the deaths in Western Province were near Lake Kivu. 4,100 livestock were killed as well. Floods also affected Rwanda's Northern and Southern Provinces. Landslides and flooding destroyed 26 bridges and 17-20 roads, 12 power stations, eight water treatment plants, five health centers, two health posts, and a hospital. 5,100-5,963 homes were destroyed and an additional 2,500 were damaged.

Marie-Solange Kayisire, the Minister of Emergency Management, said that relief efforts started immediately. However, continued disruptions by heavy rain hampered efforts to help bury victims of the floods and to provide supplies to victims whose homes were inundated. According to Governor Habitegeko, some people were rescued and transported to hospitals. The Red Cross assisted with relief efforts. Kayisire called on local residents to increase patrols, especially at night.

Rwandan Prime Minister Edouard Ngirente attended a burial service in Rubavu District on May 4, where he said that authorities would "continue to ensure that you [victims] have shelter and basic needs".

The Government established a command center. to coordinate relief efforts by deploying a team of rescue officials from affected provinces The ministry of emergency and Management, The ministry of local government and the police and provided medical treatment for those who were affected, provided food and shelter The humanitarian organization like HOT, through Open Street Map Rwanda supported with tools like FMTM and youth involvement in data collection to facilitate the Districts in future data driven decision making, Red Cross Rwanda Organizations provided funds for The rapid response from FAO, WFP, WHO. The emergency relief coordinator Martin Griffiths has allocated $1.5 millions from the central emergency response fund CFRF to support the government led response

Many flood victims were buried in mass burials.

== Uganda ==
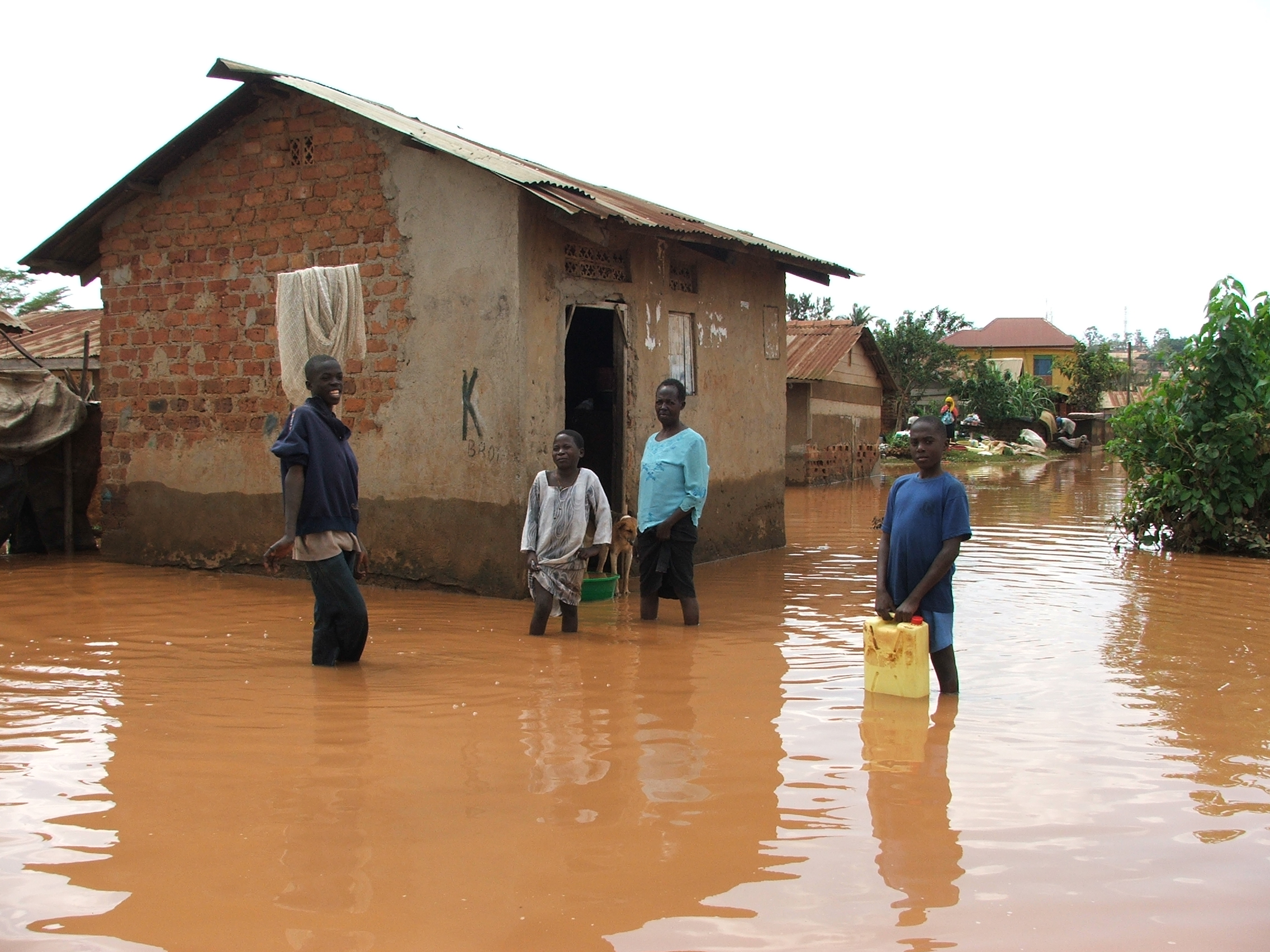
Flooding in Bwaise a Kampala Suburb

From 24 April to 3 May, at least 18 people were killed in Uganda, including five members of a family who were killed in a landslide; three were injured and three were left missing by floods. Heavy rain caused flooding and landslides in Kasese, Mbale and Rukungiri Districts. Many houses were damaged or destroyed in the country. On 17 May, the National Environment Management Authority of Uganda said that 23 people died and 16 were injured due to landslides and floods in Ntokoro and Kigezi Districts. The Katonga River flooded and submerged Uganda's major trans-national road.
