= List of Rwanda districts by population =

This is a list of the districts of Rwanda by population as of August 15, 2012, the date of the 2012 Rwanda population and housing census. Gasabo District of Kigali City is the most populous district with more than half a million people, while Nyarugenge of Kigali City is the least populous. This list compares the results from 2012 census with the results from 2002 when the last census was held.

== Districts by population ==
Rank in Rwanda Districts, 2012	Rank in Rwanda Districts, 2002	District	Province	Population August 15, 2012	Population, August 15, 2002	Population Change 2002-2012 (%)	Population Density 2012 (per km^{2})	Population Density Rank, 2012
1	6	Gasabo	Kigali City	530,907	320,516	65.6	1237	3
2	20	Nyagatare	Eastern Province	466,944	255,104	83.0	243	29
3	10	Gatsibo	Eastern Province	433,997	283,456	53.1	275	28
4	2	Rusizi	Western Province	404,278	331,950	21.9	422	19
5	8	Rubavu	Western Province	404,278	292,653	38.1	1041	4
6	1	Gicumbi	Northern Province	397,871	359,716	10.6	480	16
7	3	Nyamasheke	Western Province	383,138	325,032	17.9	326	22
8	7	Musanze	Northern Province	368,563	307,078	20.0	695	5
9	15	Bugesera	Eastern Province	363,339	266,775	36.2	282	28
10	29	Kayonza	Eastern Province	346,751	209,723	65.3	179	30
11	19	Kamonyi	Southern Province	342,792	261,336	31.2	523	8
12	12	Nyamagabe	Southern Province	342,112	280,007	22.2	314	23
13	24	Ngoma	Eastern Province	340,983	235,109	44.0	390	20
14	4	Gakenke	Northern Province	338,586	322,043	5.1	481	15
15	26	Kirehe	Eastern Province	338,562	229,468	48.6	288	25
16	5	Burera	Northern Province	336,455	320,759	4.9	522	9
17	11	Ngororero	Western Province	334,413	282,249	18.5	493	12
18	13	Karongi	Western Province	331,571	278,944	18.9	334	21
19	16	Huye	Southern Province	328,605	265,446	23.8	565	6
20	27	Nyanza	Southern Province	323,388	225,209	43.6	481	14
21	17	Rutsiro	Western Province	323,251	264,360	22.3	279	27
22	18	Gisagara	Southern Province	322,803	262128	23.1	475	17
23	22	Ruhango	Southern Province	322,021	245,833	31.0	514	10
24	30	Kicukiro	Kigali City	319,661	207819	53.8	1918	2
25	9	Muhanga	Southern Province	318,965	287,219	11.1	492	13
26	28	Rwamagana	Eastern Province	310,238	220,502	40.7	455	18
27	14	Nyabihu	Western Province	295,580	268,367	10.1	556	7
28	25	Nyaruguru	Southern Province	293,424	231,496	26.8	290	24
29	21	Rulindo	Northern Province	288,452	252,266	14.8	509	11
30	23	Nyarugenge	Kigali City	284,860	236,990	20.2	2127	1

== See also ==
- List of cities in Rwanda
