= List of roads in Rwanda =

The following is a list of national roads in Rwanda. These primary highways are under the jurisdiction of the Rwanda Transport Development Agency (RTDA) under the Ministry of Infrastructure.

The legal framework for these roads is established by the Law N°55/2011 of 14/12/2011 Governing Roads in Rwanda, which classifies national roads as international roads linking Rwanda with neighbouring countries, roads linking districts, or those connecting areas of national importance such as ports and airports.

Following a reclassification process that culminated in the mid-2010s, Rwanda transitioned its road numbering from a French-based system (Route Nationale, RN) to an English-based system (National Road, NR). This change reflects the country's broader administrative shift toward English as an official language following its entry into the Commonwealth of Nations.

== National roads ==
The Rwandan national road network is governed by Law N°55/2011 of 14/12/2011 Governing Roads in Rwanda, which classifies national roads as those linking the country to neighbouring states, connecting districts, or serving areas of significant economic and tourist importance.

The network uses the prefix NR. The primary roads (NR1–NR5) form a radial system originating from Kigali, connecting the capital to major towns and international borders. The remaining routes extend this network further, either as spurs from regional hubs such as Musanze and Muhanga, or as cross-routes linking districts and international borders without passing through Kigali.

List of national roads in Rwanda
Number	Route	Length	Surface
NR1	Kigali – Muhanga – Nyanza – Huye – Akanyaru (border with Burundi)	157.839 km (98.077 mi)	Paved
NR2	Kigali – Musanze – Rubavu (border with the Democratic Republic of the Congo)	150.015 km (93.215 mi)	Paved
NR3	Kigali – Rukoma – Gatuna (border with Uganda)	78.010 km (48.473 mi)	Paved
NR4	Kigali – Rwamagana – Kayonza – Rusumo (border with Tanzania)	169.339 km (105.222 mi)	Paved
NR5	Kigali – Nyamata – Nemba (border with Burundi)	61.980 km (38.513 mi)	Paved
NR6	Ngoma – Sake – Ramiro – Kibugabuga – Ruhuha – Gasoro – Nyanza – Gitwe	144.157 km (89.575 mi)	Paved and unpaved
NR7	Rugobagoba – Kinazi – Ruhango – Gitwe – Buhanda – Kirinda – Birambo – Karongi	111.606 km (69.349 mi)	Unpaved
NR8	Nyamiyaga – Gisagara – Akanyaru Bas (border with Burundi)	90.720 km (56.371 mi)	Mostly unpaved
NR9	Huye – Kibeho – Ndago – Munini – Bitare (border with Burundi)	77.236 km (47.992 mi)	Paved and unpaved
NR10	Huye – Nyamagabe – Kitabi – Buhinga	115.274 km (71.628 mi)	Paved
NR11	Ruhwa (border with Burundi) – Bugarama – Rusizi – Buhinga – Karongi – Rusiro – Rubavu	270.406 km (168.022 mi)	Paved and unpaved
NR12	Kitabi – Musebeya – Gishyita	83.759 km (52.045 mi)	Unpaved
NR13	Musebeya – Kaduha – Buhanda – Kirengeri	68.915 km (42.822 mi)	Unpaved
NR14	Nyamagabe – Rukondo – Musange – Mukungu – Gasenyi – Kibuye	112.240 km (69.743 mi)	Unpaved
NR15	Muhanga – Nyange – Rubengera	61.454 km (38.186 mi)	Paved
NR16	Muhanga – Ngororero – Kabaya – Mukamira	98.764 km (61.369 mi)	Paved
NR17	Cyakabili – Nyabikenke – Musanze – Cyanika (border with Uganda)	123.603 km (76.803 mi)	Paved and unpaved
NR18	Musanze – Kinigi – Kabatwa – Busasamana – Petite Barrière (border with the DRC)	94.046 km (58.437 mi)	Paved and unpaved
NR19	Base – Kiruri – Miyove – Kisaro – Gicumbi – Nyagatare – Ryabega	141.897 km (88.171 mi)	Paved and unpaved
NR20	Kiruri – Butaro	36.368 km (22.598 mi)	Unpaved
NR21	Kidaho – Butaro – Kivuye – Gicumbi	74.872 km (46.523 mi)	Unpaved
NR22	Maya – Rushaki – Kiyombe – Karama – Buziba – Rwempasha – Kizinga (border with Uganda)	83.478 km (51.871 mi)	Unpaved
NR23	Rwesero – Rwankuba – Kiramuruzi	51.155 km (31.786 mi)	Unpaved
NR24	Kayonza – Kiramuruzi – Kabarore – Gabiro – Kagitumba (border with Uganda)	116.261 km (72.241 mi)	Paved
NR25	Rukara – Murundi – Mwiri – Rwinkwavu – Nyankora – Nasho – Mpanga – Nyamugali	175.441 km (109.014 mi)	Unpaved
Total		2,748.835 km (1,708.047 mi)	

== District roads ==
District roads in Rwanda are classified under Law N°55/2011 of 14/12/2011 Governing Roads in Rwanda into two classes:

- Class 1 (D1): roads linking different sector headquarters within the same district, or roads used within a single sector.
- Class 2 (D2): arterial roads connecting district roads to rural community centres inhabited as an agglomeration.

District roads are managed by the infrastructure unit of each district, with technical oversight from RTDA. In rural areas, D1 and D2 roads typically only accommodate small trucks during the dry season, with capacity further reduced during the rainy season due to the country's mountainous terrain.

The network uses the prefix DR. There are 108 classified D1 roads, numbered DR1 to DR108, with a combined length of 3,906 km (2,427 mi), of which only 58 km (36 mi) are paved. Nearly all D1 roads branch off national roads or other district roads, extending the network into rural areas. A full list of classified D1 roads is maintained by the Rwanda Transport Development Agency.

== See also ==
- Economy of Rwanda
- Transport in Rwanda
