= Busengo =

Busengo may mean one of the following:

- Busengo, Democratic Republic of the Congo
- Busengo, Rwanda
- Busengo, Uganda
