= Muhoza =

- Sector
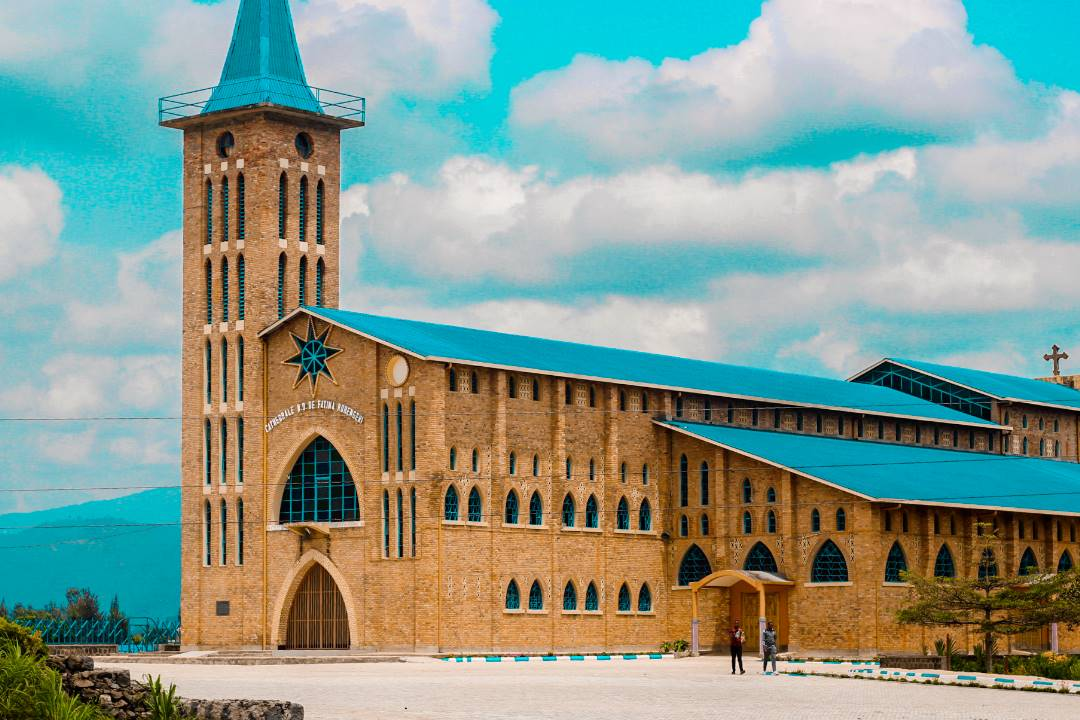
- Cathedrale Fatima

- Location in Rwanda
- Coordinates: 1°30′S 29°38′E
- Country: Rwanda
- Province: Northern Province
- District: Musanze

Area
  - Sector: 8.2 sq mi (21.2 km^{2})

Population (2022 census)
  - Sector: 69,741
  - Density: 8,520/sq mi (3,290/km^{2})
  - Urban: 65,700
- Time zone: UTC+2 (CAT)

Location of Muhoza (red) within Musanze district (grey)

Muhoza one of the sectors in Musanze District

Muhoza (Kinyarwanda: Umurenge wa Muhoza) is one of the 15 sectors in Musanze District in Rwanda's Northern Province. It is the district's administrative center.

== Geography ==
Muhoza covers an area of 21.2 km² and lies at an altitude of about 1,900 meters. The sector forms part of the urban area of Ruhengeri. It is divided into four cells: Cyabararika, Kigombe, Mpenge and Ruhengeri. Neighboring sectors are Cyuve to the north, Gacaca to the east, Rwaza to the southeast, Muko to the southwest, Kimonyi to the west, and Musanze to the northwest.

== Demographics ==
According to the census of 2022, the population was 69,741. Ten years earlier, it was 51,878, which corresponds to an annual population increase of 3.0 percent between 2012 and 2022.

== Culture and places of interest ==
Places of interest in the sector include the Cathedral of Notre Dame de Fatima and the Isaac Falls.

One of the sports facilities is the Stade Ubworoherane, the home ground of the Musanze FC football club, which has a capacity of 4,000.

== Healthcare ==
Muhoza is also home to the Ruhengeri Hospital, which was built in 1939 during the Belgian colonial era. Due to population growth, the hospital's capacity is no longer sufficient, so an expansion is planned as part of a 91 million euro infrastructure project signed in 2023 with the Agence Française de Développement (AFD, the French state development aid agency). This should increase the number of beds from 320 to 550.

== Prison ==
The Musanze Correctional Facility is located in the sector. The penal institution was built in 1935 with a capacity for around 800 prisoners. After the genocide against the Tutsi in 1994, it was expanded to a capacity of over 2200 people.

== Transportation ==
National highways 2 and 17 intersect in the sector. Ruhengeri Airport is located in the north of the sector. East of the airport, national highway 18 runs for a short distance, turning north out of national highway 17.
