= Gashaki =

- Town and Sector
- Location in Rwanda
- Coordinates: 1°33′S 29°45′E
- Country: Rwanda
- Province: Northern Province
- District: Musanze
- Time zone: UTC+2 (CAT)

Gashaki one of the sectors in Musanze District

Gashaki is a town and sector in the Musanze district of Northern Province, Rwanda.
