= Murambi =

Coordinates: 1.8133°S 30.0456°E

- Sector
- Interactive map of Murambi
- Country: Rwanda
- Province: Northern Province
- District: Rulindo

Area
  - Total: 59.77 km^{2} (23.08 sq mi)

Population (2022 census)
  - Total: 38,498
  - Density: 644.1/km^{2} (1,668/sq mi)
- Time zone: UTC+2 (CAT)

Murambi is a sector in Rulindo District

Murambi is a sector in the Rulindo district of Northern Province, Rwanda.

== See also ==
- Murambi Genocide Memorial Centre
