= Shyorongi =

- Town and sector
- Location in Rwanda
- Coordinates: 1.85330°S 29.96884°E
- Country: Rwanda
- Province: Northern Province
- District: Rulindo

Area
  - Town and sector: 46.69 km^{2} (18.03 sq mi)

Population (2022 census)
  - Town and sector: 43,744
  - Density: 936.9/km^{2} (2,427/sq mi)
  - Urban: 23,266
- Time zone: UTC+2 (CAT)

Shyorongi is a sector in Rulindo District

Shyorongi is a town and sector in the Rulindo district of Northern Province, Rwanda.
