= Kagitumba–Kayonza–Rusumo Road =

Road in Rwanda

Route information
- Length: 129 mi (208 km)
- History: Completion in 2019

Major junctions
- North end: Kagitumba
- Kayonza
- South end: Rusumo

Location
- Country: Rwanda

Highway system
- Transport in Rwanda

The Kagitumba–Kayonza–Rusumo Road is a road in the Eastern Province of Rwanda, connecting the urban centers of Kagitumba, at the border with Uganda to Kayonza, the district headquarters of Kayonza District and to Rusumo, at the border wirth Tanzania. The road connects the Northern Corridor in Uganda to the Central Corridor in Tanzania.

== Location ==
The road starts at Kagitumba at the international border with Uganda. It follows a general southerly direction, through Kayonza, to end in Rusumo, at the international border with Tanzania, a total distance of 208 kilometres (129 mi). The town of Kayonza is an approximate midpoint on the road, located 123 kilometres (76 mi) south of Kagitumba and 85 kilometres (53 mi) north of Rusumo.

== Overview ==
Prior to 2018 this transport corridor, which lies entirely within Rwanda, was gravel-surfaced in varying stages of disrepair. Using funds provided by the government of Rwanda, together with loans and donations from development partners, the road was widened and improved to class II bitumen standard, with shoulders, drainage channels and culverts.

== Upgrading to bitumen ==
In 2018, the upgrade of the road to grade II bitumen standard, with culverts, shoulders and drainage channels began. By the end of 2018, an estimated 75 percent of the work was complete, with total completion expected during the fourth quarter of 2019. At that time, the cost of improvements was quoted as €187,210,000 (approx. US$212,000,000).

== Funding ==
The road widening and rehabilitation benefitted from funding by the following entities (a) Government of Rwanda (b) African Development Bank (c) European Union Africa Infrastructure Fund and (d) Japan International Cooperation Agency.

== See also ==
- List of roads in Rwanda
- Economy of Rwanda
