= Rukozo =

Coordinates: 1.6169°S 29.9533°E

- Town and Sector
- Interactive map of Rukozo
- Country: Rwanda
- Province: Northern Province
- District: Rulindo
- Time zone: UTC+2 (CAT)

Rukozo is a town and sector in the Rulindo district of Northern Province, Rwanda.
