= Rusiga =

- Town and Sector
- Location in Rwanda
- Coordinates: 1°49′S 29°55′E
- Country: Rwanda
- Province: Northern Province
- District: Rulindo
- Time zone: UTC+2 (CAT)

Rusiga is a town and sector in the Rulindo district of Northern Province, Rwanda.
