= Tare, Rwanda =

Tare
- Sector and town
- Location in Rwanda
- Coordinates: 1°42′56″S 29°54′52″E
- Country: Rwanda
- Province: Northern Province
- District: Rulindo
- Time zone: UTC+2 (CAT)

Tare is a town and sector and capital of Rulindo district of Northern Province, Rwanda.

In April 1994 it had a population of 3,426. It is the birthplace of Grégoire Kayibanda, the first president of Rwanda.
