= Cyuve =

- Sector and town
- Location in Rwanda
- Coordinates: 1°29′S 29°39′E
- Country: Rwanda
- Province: Northern Province
- District: Musanze

Area
  - Sector and town: 12.80 sq mi (33.16 km^{2})

Population (2022 census)
  - Sector and town: 62,179
  - Density: 4,857/sq mi (1,875/km^{2})
  - Urban: 16,847
- (2012 census)
- Time zone: UTC+2 (CAT)

Cyuve one of the sectors in Musanze district

Cyuve is a sector and town in the Musanze district of Northern Province, Rwanda.
