= 2023 Africa floods =

Meteorological history
- Duration: 5 February 2023 – 28 December 2023

Flood

Overall effects
- Fatalities: 2,683 (Note: At least 1,456 deaths were caused by tropical cyclones which caused flooding.)
- Injuries: 2,158 (Note: At least 2,004 injuries were from floods caused by tropical cyclones.)
- Missing: 2,658
- Areas affected: Angola, Cameroon, Democratic Republic of the Congo, Ethiopia, Kenya, Madagascar, Malawi, Mozambique, Rwanda, Sierra Leone, Somalia, South Africa, Tanzania, Uganda, Zimbabwe
- Houses destroyed: 146,066

From February to late-December 2023, floods killed over 2,600 people in 15 countries across Africa.

== Background ==
Frequent heavy rains causing damage and casualties between March and May are common in East Africa – in May 2020 around 80 people were killed by floods in Rwanda. Floods and droughts have increased in Rwanda over a 30-year period. Rwanda's weather authority attributes the unusual rainfall patterns to climate change.

In 2023, several rounds of heavy rain saturated the ground, increasing the likelihood of flooding. Between January and April 2023, the Ministry of Emergency Management reported that weather-related disasters caused 60 fatalities, destroyed over 1,205 homes and damaged 5,000 acres of land across Rwanda. On 2 May, the Rwanda Meteorology Agency predicted above-average forecast rainfall for the next 10 days. The Rwandan government previously asked residents living in wetlands and other dangerous areas to relocate.

Uganda had also experienced heavy rain since March, which had caused landslides that destroyed homes and displaced hundreds of people.

== Impact ==
Floods formed by various causes killed 1,216 people in Malawi, 552 in the Democratic Republic of the Congo, 198 in Mozambique, 186 in Kenya, 160 in Somalia, 135 in Rwanda, 95 in Tanzania, 40 in Madagascar, 29 in Ethiopia, 18 in Uganda, 15 in South Africa and another in Cameroon.

=== Algeria ===
In early September, floods caused by torrential rain killed at least eight people in western Algeria.

=== Angola ===
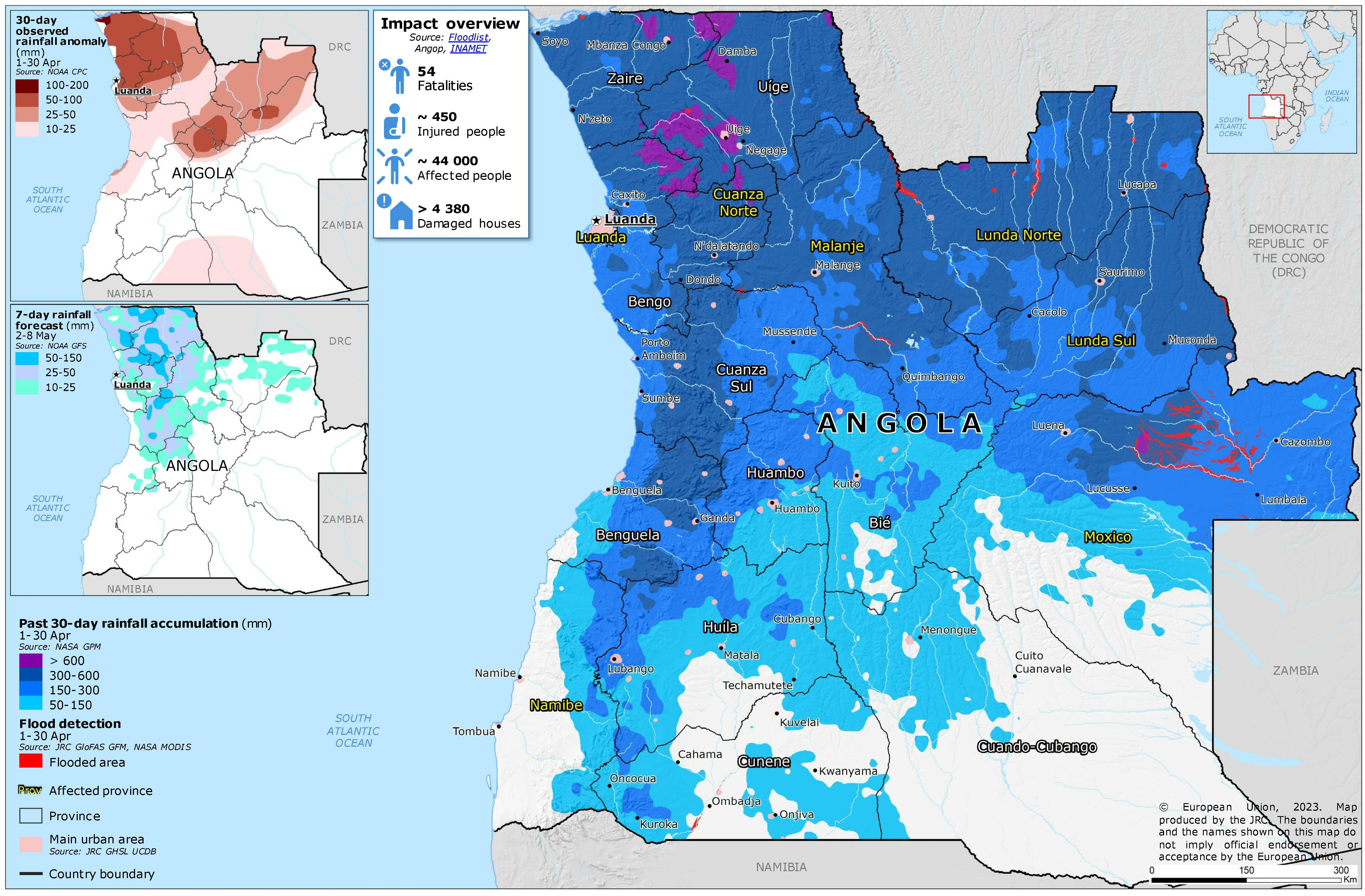
Rainfall and floods in Angola

In Angola, at least 20 people died and 2,900 homes were destroyed by flooding in April.

=== Cameroon ===
One person died, five were injured and six were missing as a result of floods that struck Buea, Cameroon in March.

=== Democratic Republic of the Congo ===
Floods and landslides in Rwanda and the DRC around Lake Kivu

On 3 April, a landslide killed 30 people and left several missing in North Kivu Province. Another landslide hit North Kivu Province on 8 May, killing six and leaving dozens of miners missing.

At least 440 people were killed and over 2,500 others were left missing by floods in the villages of Bushushu and Nyamukubi in South Kivu, Democratic Republic of the Congo on 5 May. In response to the flooding, President of the Democratic Republic of the Congo Felix Tshisekedi announced a national day of mourning for 8 May. Two landslides hit North Kivu Province on 9 May, killing ten people in Lubero and at least six people at the Songambele mine, and leaving dozens of miners missing. 100 workers were at the mine at the time of the landslide.

Southeastern parts of the country were affected by flooding on 28 December, killing 60 people, leaving 16 others missing, destroying over 100 houses and damaging 1,400 others, mostly in the Bukavu area.

=== Ethiopia ===
Floods affected parts of Ethiopia in March, killing 29 people and affecting 240,000 others.

=== Ghana ===
A NADMO report shows that 35,857 people in the Volta Region were affected by floods after the Akosombo Dam released excess water on October 14, 2023. Over 21,000 people were displaced, seven injured, and one hospital evacuated. Flooded roads isolated some communities, and the situation worsened with more rain.

=== Kenya ===
Floods affected several regions of Kenya in late March, killing 12 people, injuring five and displacing 812 families.

In April, four people died and around 36,400 people were affected by flooding in the west and northeast regions of Kenya.

Throughout November, the northern part of the country was affected by the worst flooding observed in Kenya for over a century. At least 170 people and tens of thousands of livestock were killed and over 600,000 others were displaced.

=== Madagascar ===
Cyclone Cheneso killed 33 people and left 20 missing in Madagascar, with many homes affected.

At least 17 people died and three were missing due to floods caused by Cyclone Freddy. A total of 6,706 houses were destroyed by the cyclone.

=== Malawi ===
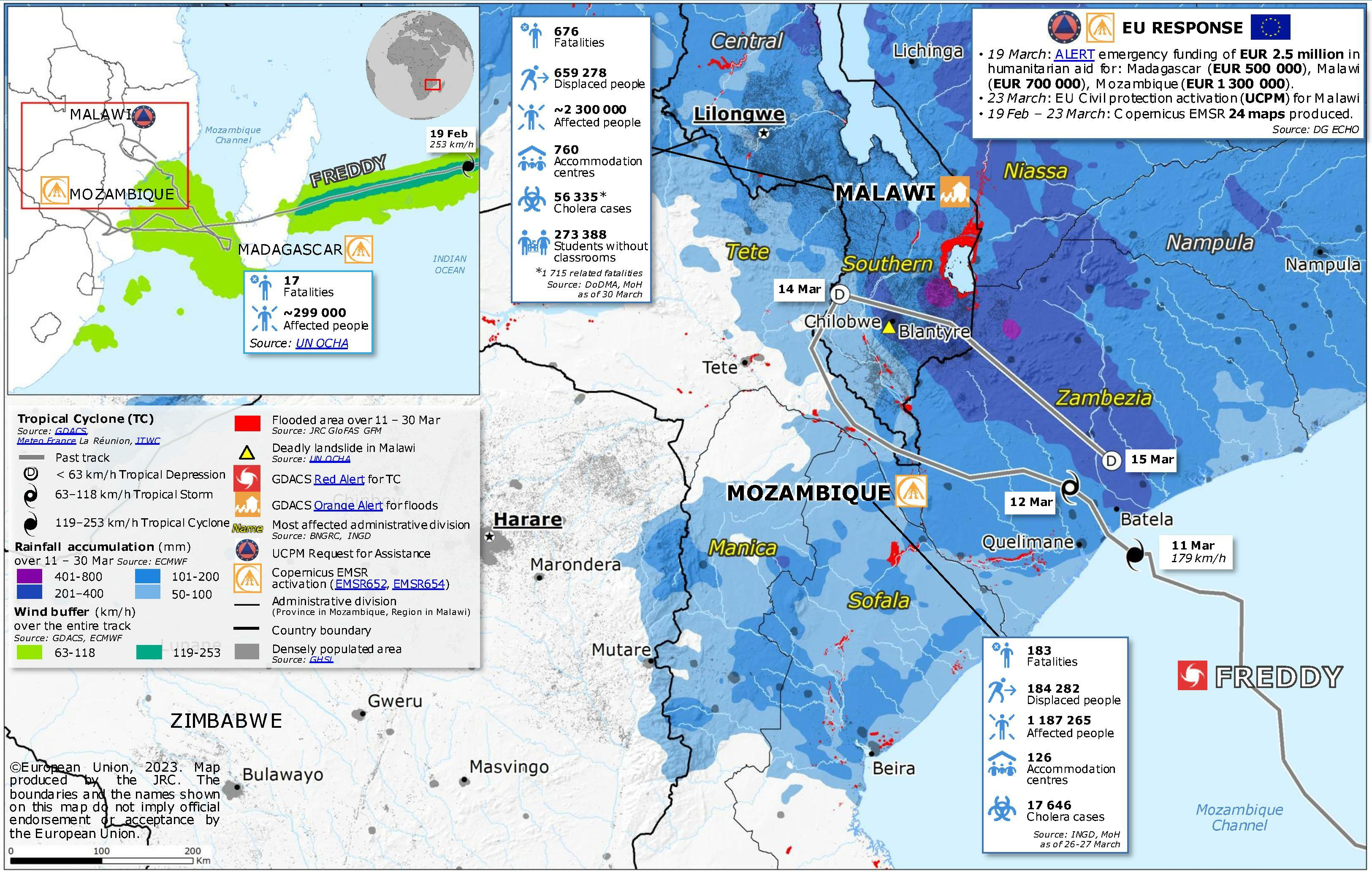

In March, the long-lived Cyclone Freddy hit Malawi, causing flooding which killed 1,216 people, including 537 missing and presumed dead, injured 1,724 others and affected over 500,000 residents in the country.

=== Mozambique ===
Due to Cyclone Freddy, at least 198 people died and 201 were injured by flooding in Mozambique. At least 131,300 homes destroyed in the country.

=== Niger ===
Floods in Niger

Thirty-two people died, 30 were injured and 110,000 more were affected by floods caused by torrential rains between June and September.

=== Rwanda ===
Heavy rain started around 16:00 UTC (6 p.m. local time) on 2 May 2023 and continued throughout the night, killing at least 135 people. The Sebeya River burst its banks. The most affected areas in Rwanda were Rutsiro, Nyabihu, Rubavu, and Ngororero. More rainfall is expected during the rest of the month. According to François Habitegeko, the governor of Rwanda's western province, people were crushed by the collapse of several houses, and landslides made the main roads in the area impassable, along with flooded fields. 4,100 livestock were killed as well. Landslides and flooding destroyed 26 bridges and 17 roads, five health centers, two health posts, and a hospital. 5,100 homes were destroyed and an additional 2,500 were damaged. Rwanda's public broadcaster RBA stated that the number of casualties may increase as floodwaters continue to rise.

=== Sierra Leone ===
A storm brought heavy rain from 9 to 10 May, which caused floods and mudslides that killed at least seven people in the capital Freetown.

=== Somalia ===
In Somalia, hundreds of homes were damaged and there were 20 deaths (including a mother and her two children), two injuries and 8,000 people were affected due to floods in Bardhere District on March 24.

Flooding in May killed an additional 22 people and over 460,000 people were affected.

Throughout October and November, floods killed 118 people, damaged 224 schools and displaced 1.2 million people across the country.

=== South Africa ===
There were 15 deaths and four missing in eastern South Africa due to floods that lasted from February to March.

=== Tanzania ===
In April 2023, seven people died, six were missing, 1,400 were displaced and 60 houses were destroyed by floods in Rukwa. In December 2023, dozens were killed in floods. The floods affected the Hanang region.

In early December, floods and landslides in Hanang District killed 88 people, injured 139 others, damaged or destroyed 1,245 houses, and affected 10,090 people.

=== Uganda ===
Accumulated rainfall, floods and landslides in Uganda between April 30 and May 16

At least 23 people were killed, including five from a landslide, three were injured and three were left missing by floods in Uganda. Many houses were damaged or destroyed in the country.

=== Zimbabwe ===
Two people were killed in Zimbabwe after Cyclone Freddy hit the country.

== Aftermath ==
=== Rwanda ===
Marie-Solange Kayisire, the Minister of Emergency Management, said that relief efforts started immediately. However, continued disruptions by heavy rain hampered efforts to help bury victims of the flooding disaster and providing supplies to victims whose homes were inundated. The Rwanda Meteorological Agency warned that additional rainfall is likely. According to Francois Habitegeko, some people were rescued and transported to hospitals. The Red Cross assisted with relief efforts. Marie-Solange Kayisire, the minister in charge of the emergency department, called on local residents to increase patrols and law enforcement.

== See also ==
- Weather of 2023
