= Cyungo =

Town and sector in Rwanda

- Town and Sector
- Location in Rwanda
- Coordinates: 1°37′23″S 29°57′15″E
- Country: Rwanda
- Province: Northern Province
- District: Rulindo
- Time zone: UTC+2 (CAT)

Cyungo is a town and sector in the Rulindo district of Northern Province, Rwanda.

== Demographics ==
In 2012, the population of Cyungo was 13,489. In 2022, the population was 15,350, a 1.3% increase. The gender makeup is 53% male and 47% female.
