= Burega =

- Town and Sector
- Location in Rwanda
- Coordinates: 1°40′S 29°42′E
- Country: Rwanda
- Province: Northern Province
- District: Rulindo
- Time zone: UTC+2 (CAT)

Burega is a sector in Rulindo district

Burega is a town and sector in the Rulindo district of Northern Province, Rwanda.
