= Buyoga =

- Town and Sector
- Location in Rwanda
- Coordinates: 1°41′24″S 30°0′49″E
- Country: Rwanda
- Province: Northern Province
- District: Rulindo
- Time zone: UTC+2 (CAT)

Buyoga is a town and sector in the Rulindo district of Northern Province, Rwanda.
