= Mbogo =

- Town and Sector
- Location in Rwanda
- Coordinates: 1°45′52″S 29°58′12″E
- Country: Rwanda
- Province: Northern Province
- District: Rulindo
- Time zone: UTC+2 (CAT)

Mbogo is a town and sector in the Rulindo district of Northern Province, Rwanda.
