= Masoro, Rwanda =

Masoro Colline Masoro
- Town and Sector
- Location in Rwanda
- Coordinates: 1°50′S 30°3′E
- Country: Rwanda
- Province: Northern Province
- District: Rulindo
- Time zone: UTC+2 (CAT)

UMURENGE WA MASORO MUKARERE KA RULINDO

Masoro is a town and sector in the Rulindo district of Northern Province, Rwanda. It is characterized by its mountainous terrain, which has inhibited the development of infrastructure. Masoro is home to several cooperatives and community-based organizations. During the late 2010s and continuing today, new roads have allowed Masoro and the region to become better connected to larger towns and cities such as Kigali.

Masoro and the surrounding region have been the focus of a series of building projects. The Masoro Project is an ongoing project run by General Architecture Collaborative using earthbag construction to create easy-to-build one and two floor houses for the people of Masoro. The Masoro Health Center is a healthcare and wellness center that operates as a community-focused and accessible campus. The Learning and Sports Center combines sports leagues, fitness programs and classes with continuing education, technical training and internet-based instruction. The facility also provides spaces for concerts, plays, group events, as well as a library and sports fields.
