= Busengo, Rwanda =

Rwandan settlement

Busengo
- Location in Rwanda
- Coordinates: 01°40′13″S 29°39′52″E
- Country: Rwanda
- Province: Northern Province
- District: Gakenke
- Elevation: 1,788 m (5,866 ft)
- Time zone: UTC+2 (CAT)
  - Summer (DST): UTC+2 (not observed)

Busengo Sector, located in Gakenke District, is mainly characterized by agriculture and livestock farming.

Busengo is one of the nineteen sectors (imirenge) in Gakenke District, in the Northern Province of Rwanda.

== Location ==
Cyabingo lies to the north of Busengo. Kivuruga lies to the north-east. Gakenke Town lies to the south-east. Janja lies to the south, and Rusasa lies to the west of Busengo. This is approximately 95 kilometres (59 mi) north-west of Kigali, the capital and largest city of Rwanda. The geographical coordinates of Busengo, Rwanda are 01°40'13.0"S, 29°39'52.0"E (Latitude:-1.670278; Longitude:29.664444). Busengo, Rwanda lies at an average elevation of 1,788 metres (5,866 ft) above sea level.

== Overview ==
Busengo is the location of Busengo Maternity Unit, built in 2013, with assistance of the New York City-based Deerfield Foundation.

Also located here is the Lycee Polytechnique de Busengo, a public vocational school, administered by the Rwanda Ministry of Education.
