= Cyumba =

Coordinates: 1°27′50″S 30°01′00″E

- Sector
- Interactive map of Cyumba
- Country: Rwanda
- Province: Northern Province
- District: Gicumbi District

Area
  - Total: 21.47 km^{2} (8.29 sq mi)

Population (2022 census)
  - Total: 17,218
  - Density: 802.0/km^{2} (2,077/sq mi)

Cyumba is a sector in Gicumbi District, Northern Province in Rwanda with a population of 17,218 and an area of 21.47 square kilometers. The sector is 100% rural but contains the small settlement of Gatuna at the Rwanda-Uganda border.
