= Tumba, Rwanda =

Tumba
- Town and Sector
- Location in Rwanda
- Coordinates: 1°41′40″S 29°56′54″E
- Country: Rwanda
- Province: Northern Province
- District: Rulindo
- Time zone: UTC+2 (CAT)

TUMBA Sector

Tumba ni umurenge mu Karere ka Rulindo

Tumba ni umurenge mu Karere ka Rulindo

Tumba is a village and sector in the Rulindo district of Northern Province, Rwanda.
