= Mulindi =

Village in Northern Province, Rwanda

- Village
- Location in Rwanda
- Coordinates: 1°28′35″S 30°2′25″E
- Country: Rwanda
- Province: Northern
- District: Gicumbi
- Sector: Kaniga

Greetings from Mulindi

Mulindi is a village in the Gicumbi District of the Northern Province, Rwanda.

President Paul Kagame led the Rwandan Patriotic Front during the Rwandan Civil War from Mulindi. In December 2012 construction of the National Liberation Struggle Museum was started at the site of the Rwandan Patriotic Front headquarters from August 1992 to July 1994.
