= Tumba =

Tumba may refer to:

== Places ==
- Tumba, Sweden, a town and the seat of Botkyrka Municipality in Stockholm County, Sweden
- Tumba, Rwanda, a village and sector in Rulindo District, Rwanda
- Tumba (Skopje), an ancient Neolithic settlement in North Macedonia
- Tumba (Vranje), a village in the Vranje municipality of southern Serbia
- Tumba Peak (Šar), a mountain peak in south-east Kosovo
- Tumba Peak (Belasica), a mountain peak where the borders of Bulgaria, Greece and the Republic of Macedonia meet
- Tumba (Czerna Gora), a mountain peak in western Bulgaria
- Lake Tumba, a lake in the Democratic Republic of the Congo
- Bara Tumba, an ancient living area from Neolithic times in the Republic of Macedonia
- Veluška Tumba, an ancient living area from Neolithic times in the Republic of Macedonia
- La Tumba (Caracas), an underground detention facility in Caracas, Venezuela
- Tumba Church, a church building in Tumba, Botkyrka, Sweden
- Tumba Ice Cap, covering the western half of Chavdar Peninsula

== Music ==
- Tumba (music), a native musical form that is played in Aruba and Curaçao
- Tumba (drum), a kind of long, thin drum
- Tumbi, also called tumba, a traditional Punjabi musical instrument
- Tumba francesa (French tumba), a style of music brought from Haiti to Cuba following the Haitian slave rebellion of 1791
- Tumba or toomba, a resonator on Indian musical instruments such as the sitar and sarod

== People ==
- Kevin Tumba (born 1991), Belgian basketball player
- Sven Tumba (1931–2011), former Swedish ice hockey and golf player
- Tumba Silva, Angolan boxer

== Sports ==
- IFK Tumba FK, Swedish football club
- IFK Tumba Hockey, Swedish ice hockey club

== Other ==
- Tumba Bruk, the printing company responsible for manufacturing of the Swedish krona banknotes, located in Tumba, Sweden
- Tumba (drink), a Nepalese alcoholic beverage made from fermented millet or other cereals
- Tumba (Kongo), stone figures that the Kongo people placed on the graves of powerful people
- La Tumba, Caracas, Venezuela
- La Tumba (novel), a 1964 novel by José Agustín
- Tumba, a dialect of Gogo language in Tanzania

== See also ==
- Thumba, India's first rocket launching site
