= Green Gicumbi =

Governmental climate project in Rwanda

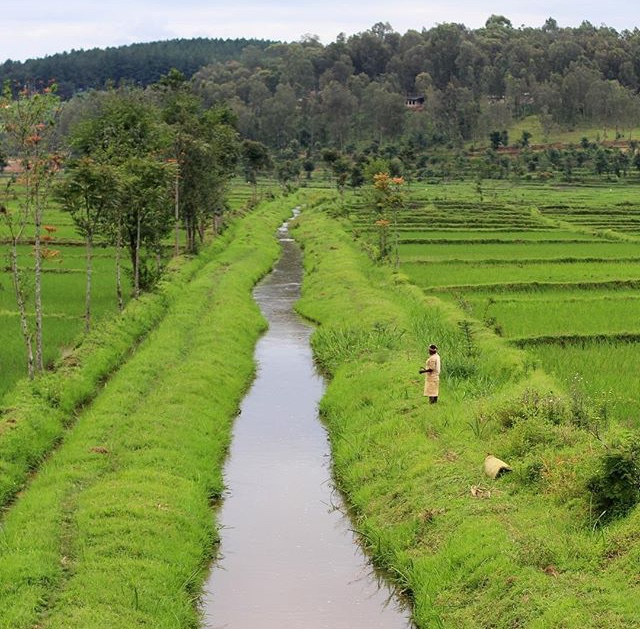
Gicumbi Environment

Strengthening climate resilience of rural communities in Northern Rwanda, commonly known as the Green Gicumbi Project, is a six-year governmental project, launched on 26 October 2019 by the Government of Rwanda, through the Ministry of the Environment and the Rwanda Green Fund (FONERWA) with the target of strengthening climate resilience of rural communities in Northern Rwanda, especially in Gicumbi District.

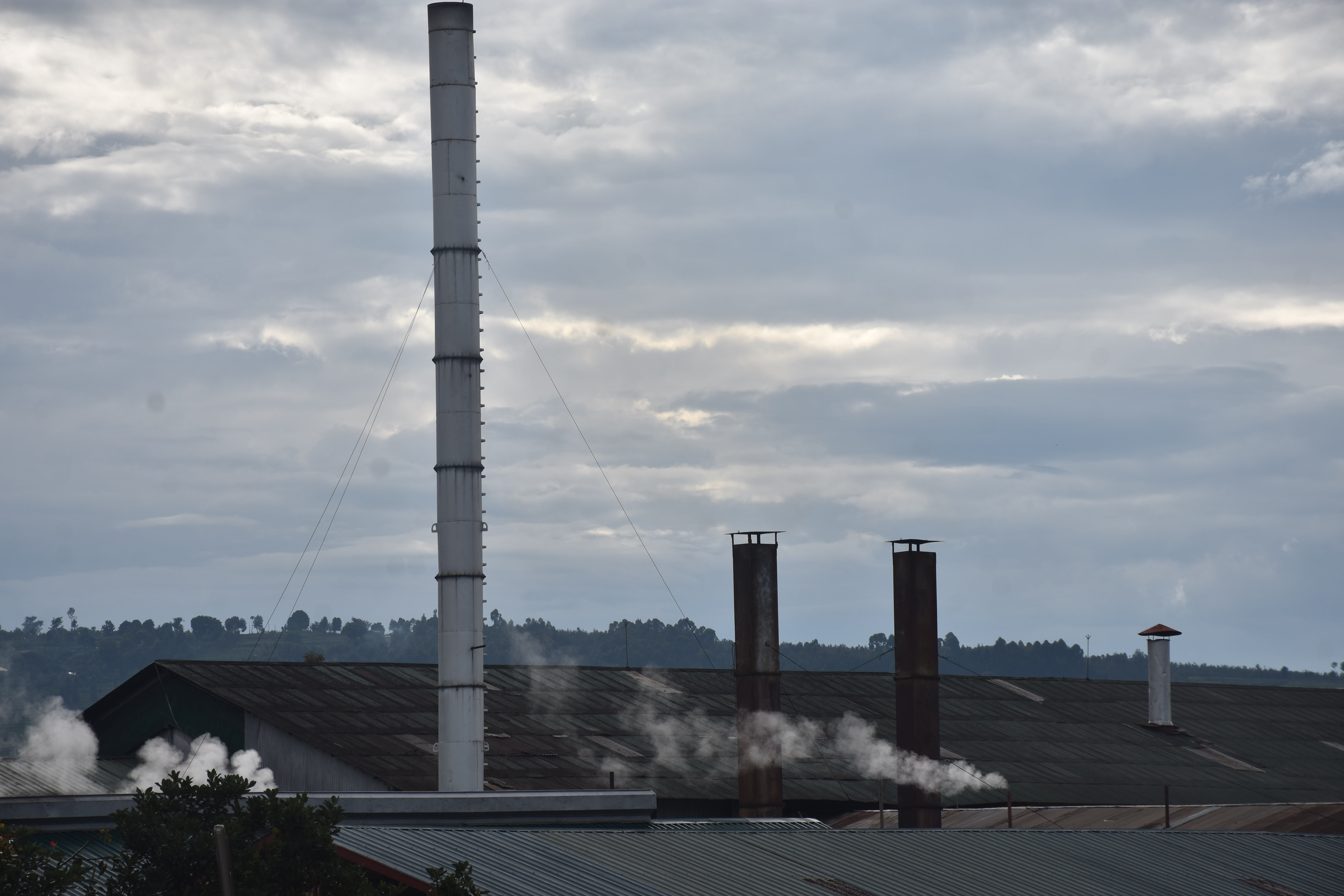
Climate exposures in Gicumbi

== Background ==
The project is to be implemented by the National Fund for the Environment. Jean Marie Vianney Kagenza is Project Director.

== Project Components ==
According to Ministry of environment of Rwanda, Green Gicumbi Project includes the following components:

1. Watershed protection and climate resilient agriculture
2. Forest management and sustainable energy
3. Climate resilient settlements
4. Knowledge development and transfer and mainstreaming

== Implementations ==
In January 2022, the Government of Rwanda, through the Green Gicumbi Project, has started constructing 200 green and climate resilient houses for Gicumbi residents, most relocated citizens will be in Ubudehe category I and category II, high risk zones. The green housing project is located in the Rubaya and Kaniga sectors, and is considered a model village where beneficiaries will receive additional support such as cows and the resources to start horticulture farms around the village, the Project Director has stated.

== Ongoing results ==
- Controlled soil erosion, thus increasing productivity before there were land affected by erosion but now the green gicumbi is solution to control soil erosion and increasing productivity by farmers.
- Climate resilient settlement is a third component of the Green Gicumbi project is “Climate Resilient Settlements”. So far 40 climate-resilient houses have been constructed and occupied by most vulnerable beneficiaries from high-risk zones in Rubaya sector, while 60 more houses are under construction in Kaniga sector, Mulindi cell to host the most vulnerable families living in high-risk zones in the same sector. Their construction progress is currently at 70% and construction activities are expected to be completed by July 2023.
- Sustainable forest management : Sustainable Forest management and sustainable energy, Green Gicumbi project has rehabilitated 1,107 hectares of degraded forests in the past three years as well as disseminated 19,900 clean cookstoves in a bid to reduce pressure on the forests and reduce carbon emissions.
