= Gatuna =

- Settlement
- Location in Rwanda
- Coordinates: 1.43333°S 30.01518°E
- Country: Rwanda
- Province: Northern Province
- District: Gicumbi District
- Sector: Cyumba Sector
- Elevation: 5,970 ft (1,820 m)
- Climate: Cwb

Gatuna is a small settlement in Cyumba Sector in northern Rwanda. It is located at the northern border adjacent to the town of Katuna, in neighboring Uganda.

== Overview ==
Gatuna is the busiest border crossing in Rwanda, a landlocked country. It handles most of Rwanda's imports and exports, since most Rwandan imports and exports via the coast pass through Uganda. The border at Gatuna and Katuna is open 24 hours a day.

== Location ==
Gatuna is located in Gicumbi District, Northern Province, at the border with the Republic of Uganda. Its location is about 80 kilometres (50 mi), by road, north of Kigali, Rwanda's capital and largest city.

== Points of interest ==
The following points of interest lie within the settlements limits or close to the edges of the settlement:

- Offices of Gatuna Town Council
- Gatuna Central Market
- The International Border Crossing between Rwanda and Uganda - The border crossing is open 24 hours daily.
- A branch of the Bank of Kigali

== See also ==
- Katuna
- Burera District
- Northern Province, Rwanda
- Katuna
- Bank of Kigali
