= Ngoma, Rulindo =

Ngoma is one of the sectors of Rulindo District in the northern province of Rwanda. The sector office is built between Busizi and Kiboha. It is on the top hill going from Jali of Gasabo District in the City of Kigali to Mugote and Remera (also known as Remera y'abaforongo)

Ngoma sector is situated at a distance of 24 km from Kigali city centre. Ngoma Sector is now home of the Rutongo Hospital, built at Mugote.

== Demographics ==
According to the 2022 census, the sector has a population of 12,703 people.
