= Musanze District =

Coordinates: 1°30′S 29°36′E

- District
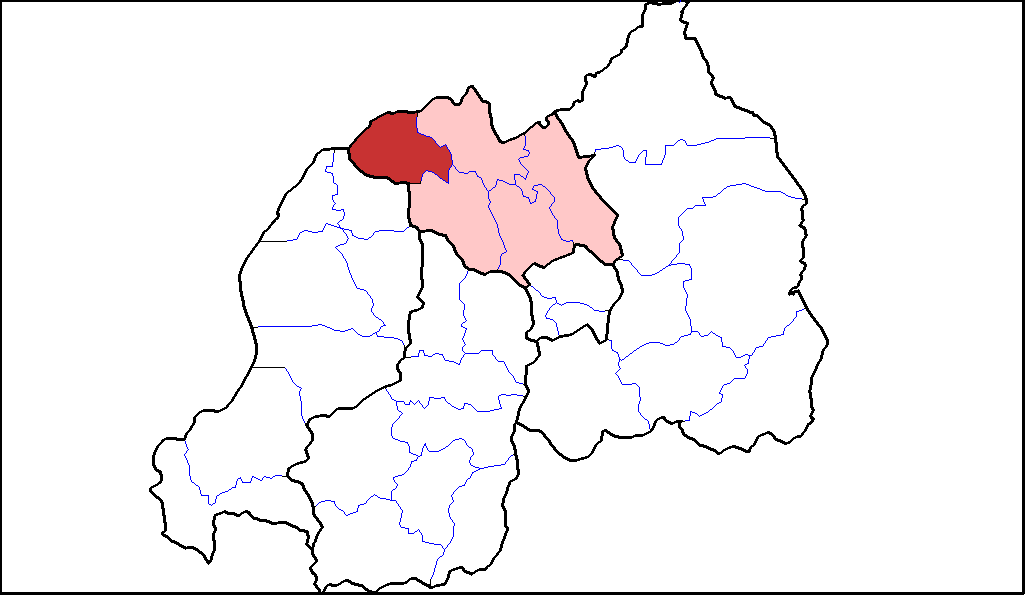
- Shown within Northern Province and Rwanda
- Country: Rwanda
- Province: Northern
- Capital: Muhoza

Area
  - District: 530.3 km^{2} (204.7 sq mi)

Population (2022 census)
  - District: 476,522
  - Density: 898.6/km^{2} (2,327/sq mi)
  - Urban: 234,258
  - Rural: 242,264

mpenge centre

AKARERE KA MUSANZE

Musanze is a district in the Northern Province of Rwanda. Its capital city is Ruhengeri.

== Geography and tourism ==
Musanze is Rwanda's most mountainous district, containing the largest part of the Volcanoes National Park, and its head office at Kinigi. Five of the eight volcanoes of the Virunga chain (Karisimbi, Bisoke, Sabyinyo, Gahinga and Muhabura) are within the district boundaries. It is also in this district that most of Rwanda's mountain gorillas are found, making it the most popular tourist destination in the country.

== Sectors ==
Musanze district is divided into 15 sectors (imirenge): Busogo, Cyuve, Gacaca, Gashaki, Gataraga, Kimonyi, Kinigi, Muhoza, Muko, Musanze, Nkotsi, Nyange, Remera, Rwaza and Shingiro. But Musanze district is not entirely covering the whole area of former Ruhengeri province. 68 cells, and 432 umudugudus/villages, with a population of 398,986.

== Irish Potatoes plantation ==
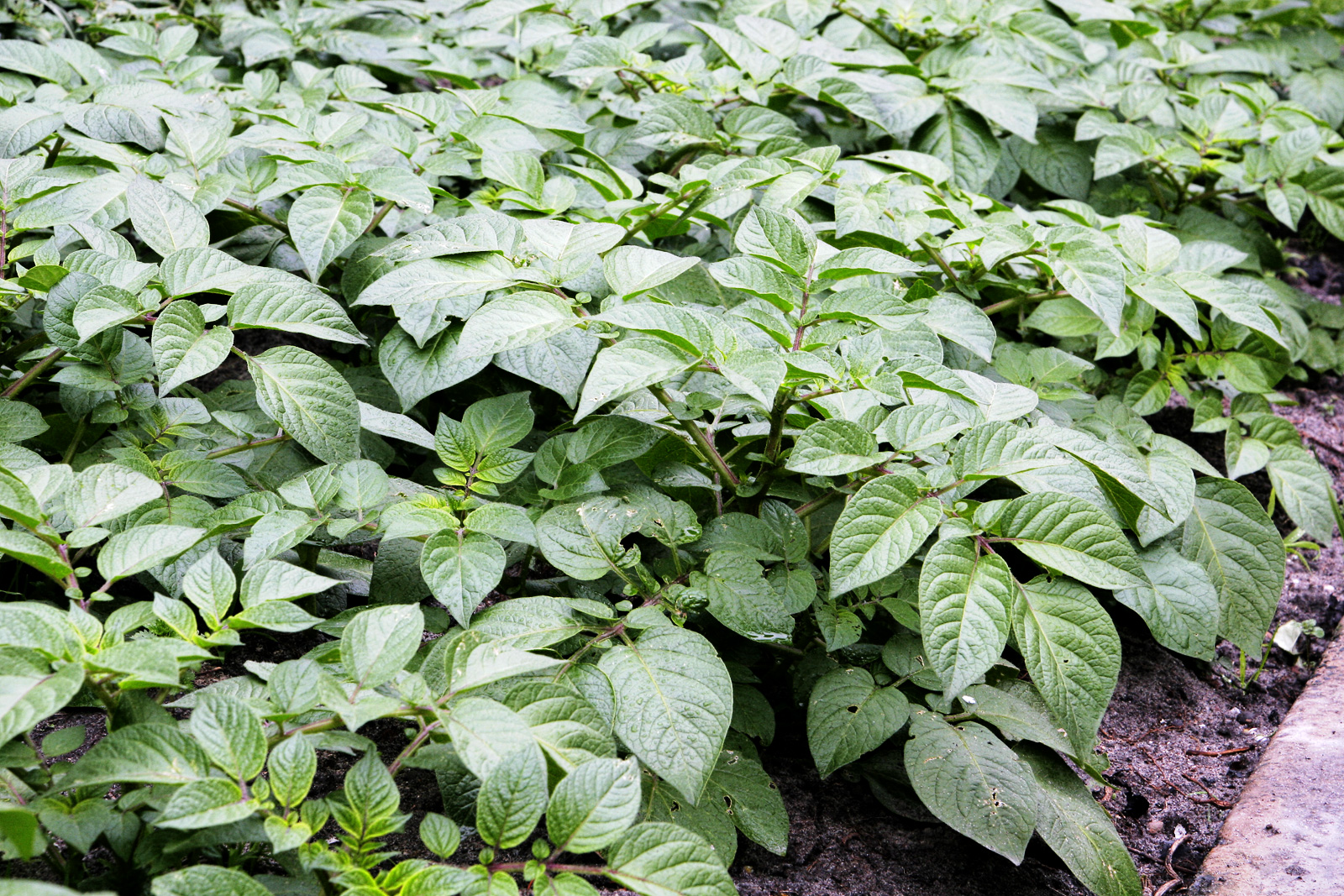
Potato plants

Irish potatoes are mainly grown in Burera, Musanze, Nyabihu and Rubavu districts and this program is expected to harmonize the Irish potato trading locally and turn it into export-oriented business

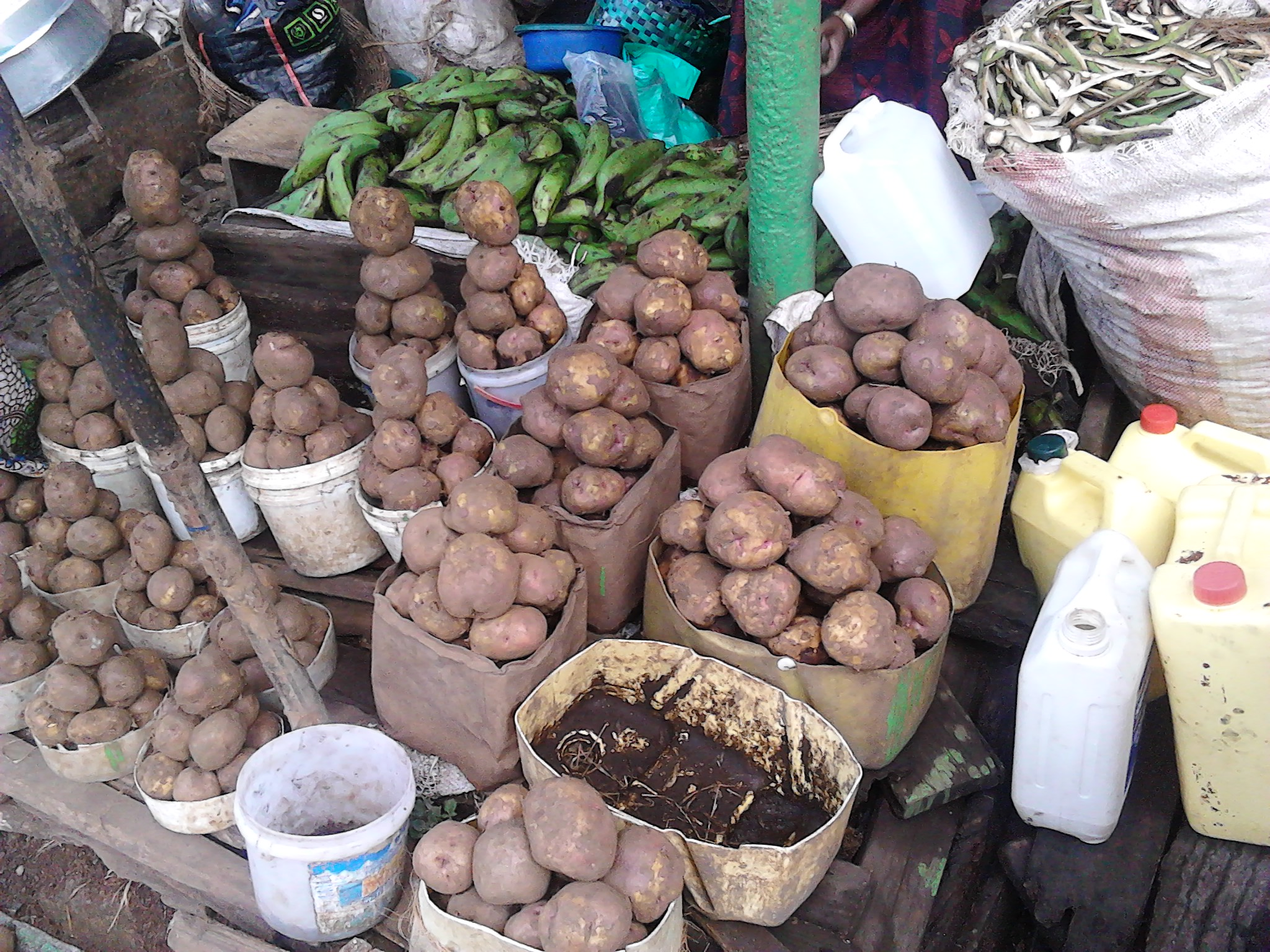
Irish potatoes in the market
