= Francois Habitegeko =

Rwandan politician

Francois Habitegeko is a Rwandan politician. He is the governor of the Western Province and former governor of the Northern Province of Rwanda.

== Career ==
Habitegeko governed the country's Northern Province beginning in February 2011 and left that post in 2021 after serving two terms. He has credited himself for vastly increasing the quality of life in Northern Province, bringing the percentage of households with electricity from 0.8% in 2011 to 90% at the end of his career.

He was appointed Governor of the Western Province on 15 March 2021, but was removed from office on 28 August 2023 by President Paul Kagame.

He supported Rwanda during the 2022 Democratic Republic of the Congo–Rwanda tensions. He supports the disarmament of the Democratic Forces for the Liberation of Rwanda, or FDLR.
