= Busengo, Democratic Republic of the Congo =

Settlement in the Democratic Republic of the Congo

Busengo
- Location within Democratic Republic of the Congo
- Coordinates: 01°09′37″S 29°34′53″E
- Country: Democratic Republic of the Congo
- Province: North Kivu
- Territory: Rutshuru Territory
- Time zone: UTC+2 (CAT)
- National language: Swahili
- Climate: Aw

Busengo is a settlement in the North Kivu Province of the Democratic Republic of the Congo. The town sits across the international border from Busengo, Uganda.

== Location ==
Busengo is located only 15 kilometres (9 mi) (as the crow flies), east of Rutshuru, the headquarters of Rutshuru Territory, in which this settlement lies. However, due to the steep terrain travel on a relatively less steep road involves driving nearly 42 kilometres (26 mi), taking more than one hour. The geographical coordinates of the settlement of Busengo, Democratic Republic of the Congo are 01°09'37.0"S, 29°34'53.0"E (Latitude:-1.160278; Longitude:29.581389).

== Overview ==
Busengo is a border crossing between Uganda and the Democratic Republic of the Congo, although not as busy as the Bunagana crossing, approximately 25 kilometres (16 mi) to the south.

== See also ==
- Beni
- Goma
