= Transport in Rwanda =

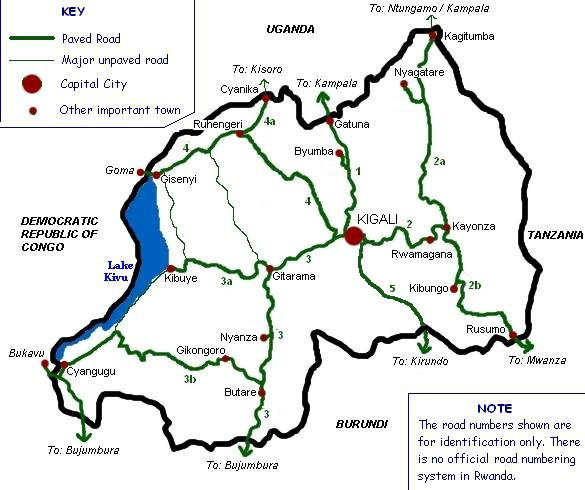
Map showing principal routes in Rwanda.

The transport system in Rwanda centres primarily around the road network. Paved roads lie between the capital, Kigali, and most other major cities and towns in the country. Rwanda is also linked by road with other countries in the African Great Lakes, via which the majority of the country's imports and exports are made.

The country has an international airport at Kigali, serving one domestic and several international destinations, and also has limited transport between the port cities on Lake Kivu.There are currently no railways in Rwanda.

A large amount of investments in the transport infrastructure has been made by the government since the 1994 genocide, with aid from the European Union, China, Japan and others.

== The road network ==
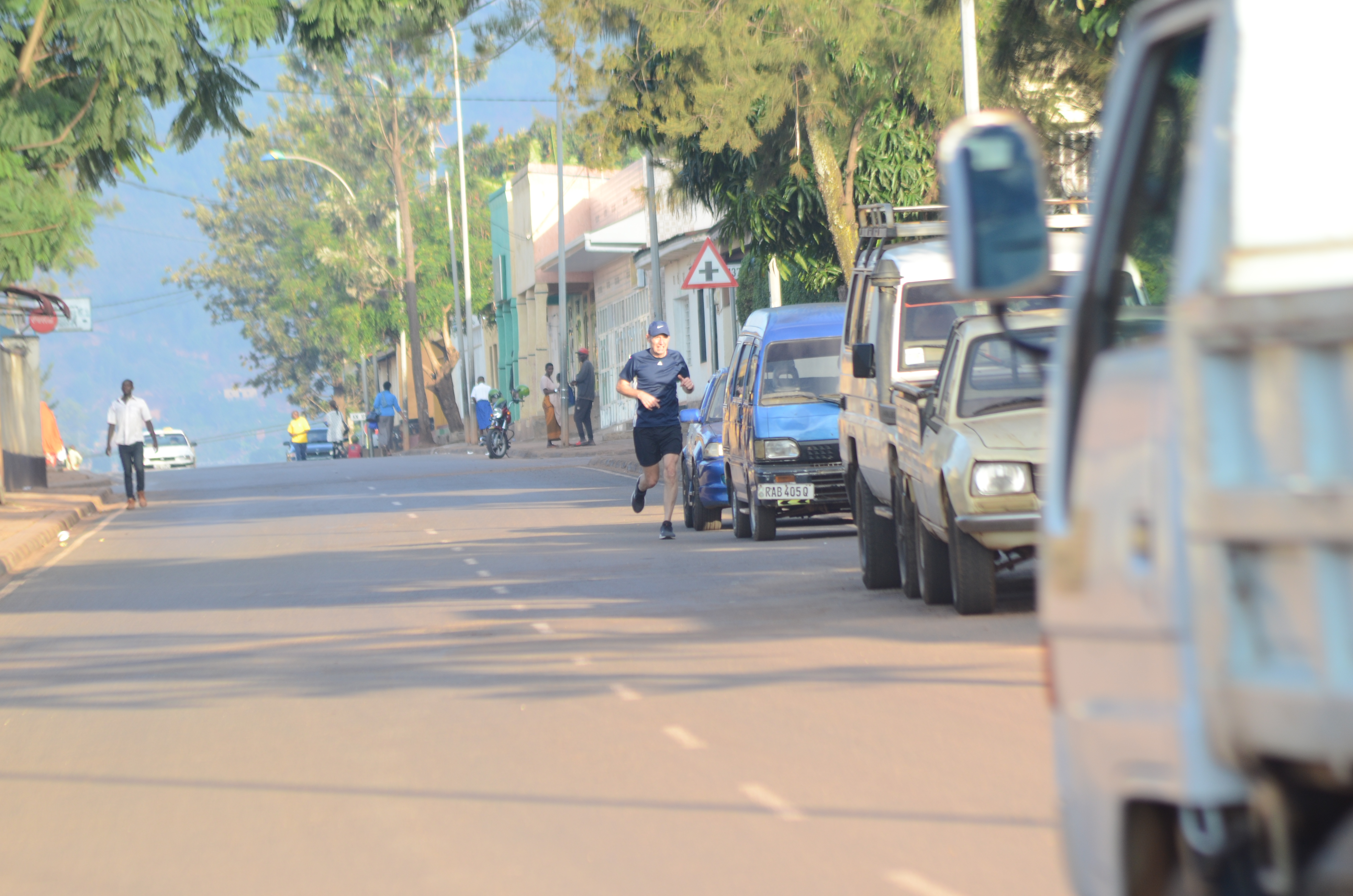
road in kigali

Rwanda has a total of 12,000 km (7,500 mi) of roads, of which 1,000 km (620 mi) are paved. The remainder are dirt roads with quality varying from smooth hard surfaces with drainage to rutted, extremely uneven tracks passable only with a four-wheel drive vehicle.

Vehicles in the country drive on the right-hand side of the road. However, the three largest members of the East African Community (EAC) to which Rwanda is a part of, including neighbouring Tanzania and Uganda, drive on the left. It is significantly cheaper to import vehicles designed to drive on the left than on the right, possibly due to the second hand market from India and Japan being cheaper than that of Europe, so more of these cars were imported until the government banned their import in 2005 due to safety concerns. Due to the difference in car price, and the potential to better economically integrate with other EAC and Common Market for Eastern and Southern Africa countries, the government has considered switching the country to driving on the left.

=== Paved roads ===
Most of the main towns in the country are now connected by paved road. The condition of these roads was until recently very poor, with numerous pot-holes and vehicles often driving on the dirt verges since these were deemed smoother than the road itself. A recent government programme of upgrading and resurfacing means that most major routes are now in good condition.

The major urban arteries of Kigali, as well as the high streets in Ruhengeri, Kibuye, and Gisenyi are dual carriageways, but all national long distance roads are single carriageway. There are no motorways in Rwanda.

The principal routes are (refer to map for number references):

#	Start	End	Via	Description
1	Kigali	Gatuna (Uganda border)	Byumba	The main road through the north of the country, this is the main route to Kabale and Kampala in Uganda
2	Kigali	Kayonza	Rwamagana	Leads east from the capital. Resurfacing of this road was recently completed, and it features Rwanda's first proper bypass around the town of Rwamagana
2a	Kayonza	Kagitumba (Uganda border)	Nyagatare	A continuation of road 2, running to the far northeast of the country. Prior to 1994, most of this road was within the Akagera National Park, but the area has now been settled, largely by refugees who returned from Uganda after the war.
2b	Kayonza	Rusumo (Tanzania border)	Kibungo	The main route into Tanzania, running down to the far southeast of the country. The border is a high bridge over the Kagera River (which is also part of the most distant headwater of the Nile)
3	Kigali	Fugi (Burundi border)	Gitarama, Butare	The road linking the main two cities of Rwanda as well as being the main link to Bujumbura, the largest city and former capital of Burundi. The section south of Gitarama was resurfaced in 2004.
3a	Gitarama	Kibuye, Rwanda		This road was surfaced for the first time by Chinese engineers within the last decade, running through very hilly terrain and crossing the Nile/Congo watershed.
3b	Butare	Cyangugu (DRC border)	Gikongoro	A very stretch of road running through the heart of Nyungwe Forest and ending on the shores of Lake Kivu. It also links to the Congolese city of Bukavu.
4	Kigali	Gisenyi (DRC border)	Ruhengeri	A road that passes first through the hilly areas around Mount Kabuye and then turns west to head along the southern edge of the Virunga volcano chain, before ending up at Gisenyi, on the shores of Lake Kivu. The road continues into Goma in the DRC.
4a	Ruhengeri	Cyanika (Uganda border)		A road linking to Ruhengeri to Kisoro in Uganda. Passes very close to Mount Muhabura and has a vista right along the Virunga chain.
5	Kigali	Burundi border	Nyamata	The road was paved a fairly recently since the government of Rwanda is considering building a new international airport near the town of Nyamata.

There is also one road that is currently a quite poor-quality dirt road, but it may soon be upgraded to paved status:

- The road running along Lake Kivu between Cyangugu, Kibuye and Gisenyi, since these towns are now linked politically in by the newly formed Western Province.

== Public transport ==
=== International ===
There are several daily coach services from Rwanda to destinations in the African Great Lakes:

- Jaguar Executive Coaches, which connects Kigali to Kampala, the Ugandan capital, via Gatuna (road 1 on the map above) or via Kayonza and Kagitumba (roads 2 and 2a).
- Regional Coach Services, which runs services to Kampala (8 hours), Nairobi, Kenya (20 hours) and Dar es Salaam, Tanzania (36 hours), all via the Gatuna border crossing. These buses are usually air-conditioned.
- Trinity Coach - a Rwandan service using quite basic buses, running between Kigali and Kampala.
- Modern Coast, a Kenyan coach and courier service which connects Gisenyi/Goma and Kigali through Gatuna to Kampala and Nairobi. It offers online booking and payment, three seat classes and in some busses personal TVs and 240 V / USB sockets.
- Yahoo Car Express - A minibus service running between Kigali and Bujumbura, Burundi. This service has been subject to ambush in the past by rebels in Burundi, although the new government claim to have sorted out this problem now.

In addition the national express share taxi services (see below) to Gisenyi and Cyangugu often cross the DRC border to carry passengers to Goma and Bukavu respectively.

=== National ===
The main form of public transport within Rwanda is the express bus, which has superseded the share taxi on the main routes.

==== Share taxi ====
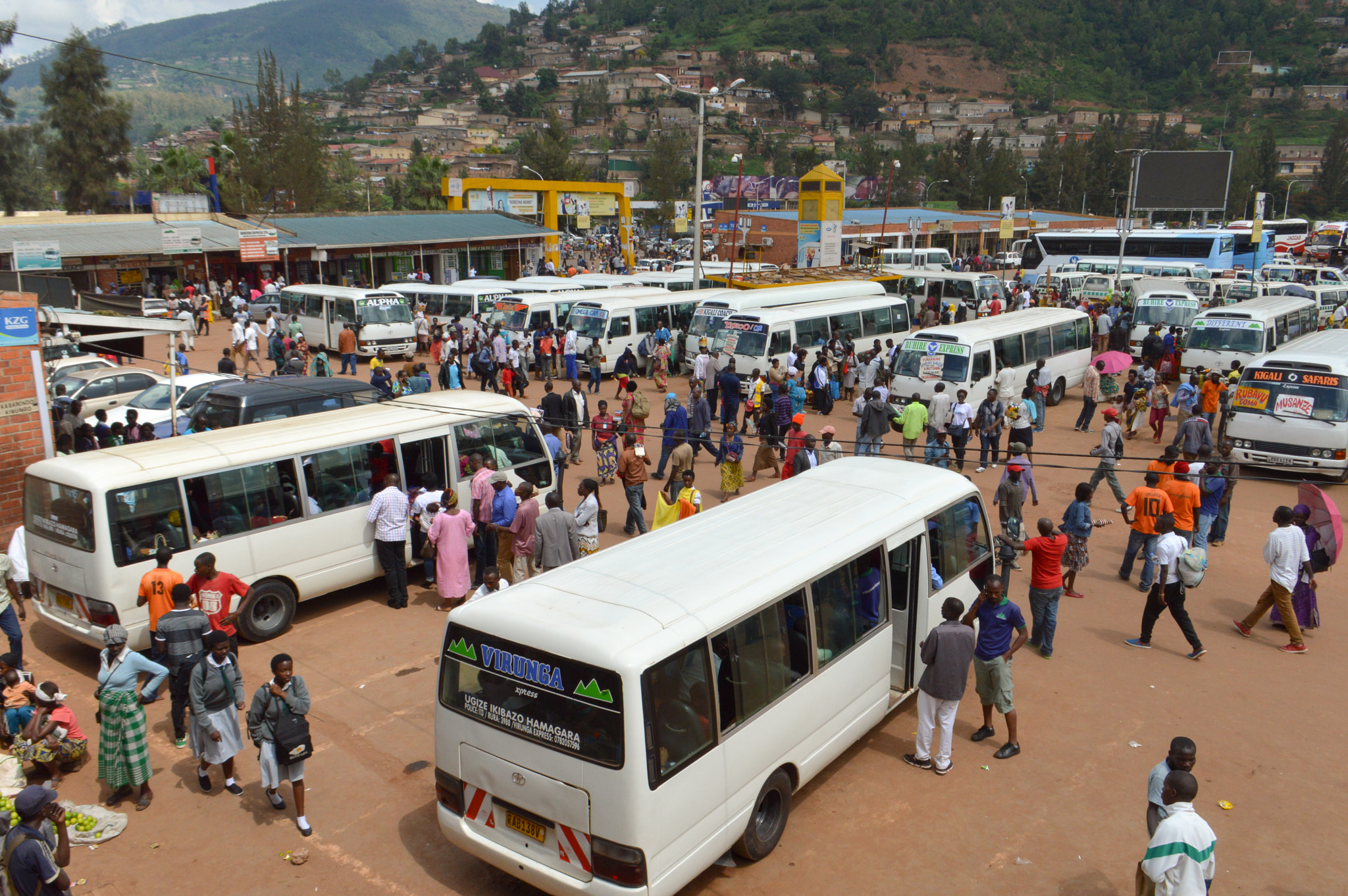
Nyabugogo Bus Station

Share taxis run between two termini (known as taxi parks), but stop frequently en route to pick up and drop off passengers. They are known locally simply as taxi or, colloquially, twegerane, which means 'let's sit together' in the Kinyarwanda language (a conventional private taxi is referred to as a special hire or taxi voiture).

They almost always wait until full before departing, and can also wait for long periods in locations along the route if not enough people are on board.

The vehicles are usually Toyota minibuses owned by a private individual who employs a driver (Fr: chauffeur) and a conductor (Fr: convoyeur) to operate and maintain the vehicle on a day-to-day basis. Most have four rows of seats, each of which seats four adults (babies and children not being counted as they are expected to sit on the lap of an adult). Additionally there are two front passenger seats, so the vehicle can carry a total of up to eighteen passengers, in addition to the driver and the conductor.

The conductor is responsible for opening and closing the main sliding door and collecting money from passengers, and will stand in the space by the door if all seats re occupied. No tickets are issued on this form of taxi.

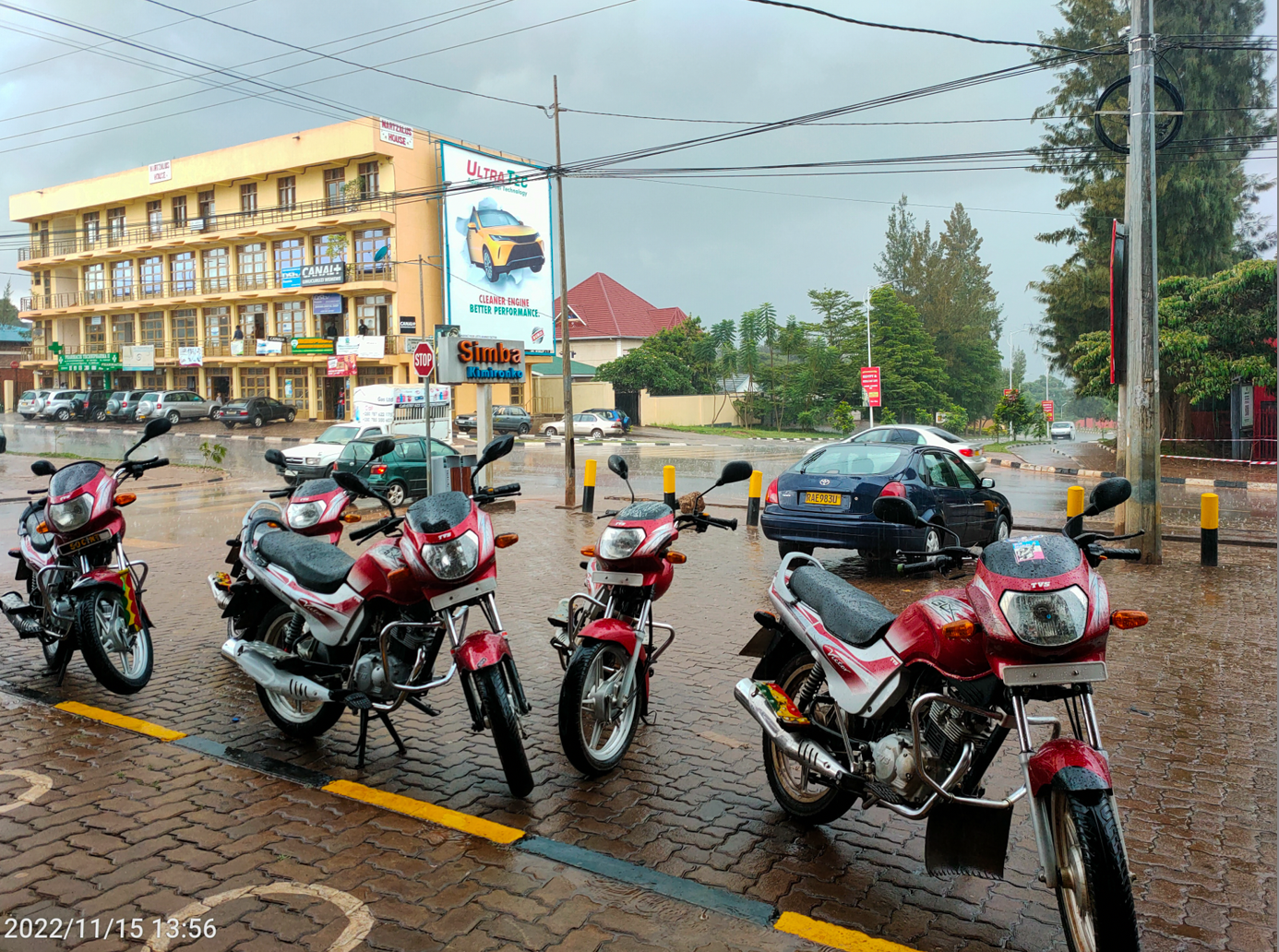
Moto taxis in Kigali (November 2022)

Moto taxis

A large portion of the vehicles on roads in Rwanda, especially Kigali, are moto taxis. A motorbike or scooter is driven and a single passenger can hop on and off the back and pay the required fare.

==== Express bus ====
These run to a set timetable (usually each 30 minutes) between major towns, only stopping at official stops near the destination(s). Even if alighting earlier, the price to the next major stop has to be paid. Almost all routes pass through Nyabugogo in Kigali.

The buses are run by private companies and issue tickets in advance with a price set by the government. As tickets are paid and printed at the offices (major stops) or by an employee along the road (smaller stops), there is no need for a conductor to collect the money in the bus. Tickets can be issued in advance, so they might be sold out quickly at busy times (especially Fridays, Sundays and at the beginning/end of school holidays).

In contrast to the Share Taxi, this form of transport respects the schedule rather than waiting to be full. Also, they are almost never overfilled and rather depart earlier.

The size ranges from Toyota Coaster to big coaches. Most coaches are run by Ritco, on which the government holds a share. It is also the only company to have stops all across the country, while its private competitors are limited to specific regions. When it was founded it replaced Onatracom, another public company.

==== Comparison ====
As of 2018, share taxis are still the main form of transport in remote areas, while express buses are used wherever available. This is due to the almost equal price and increased comfort and speed of the express buses.

=== Urban ===
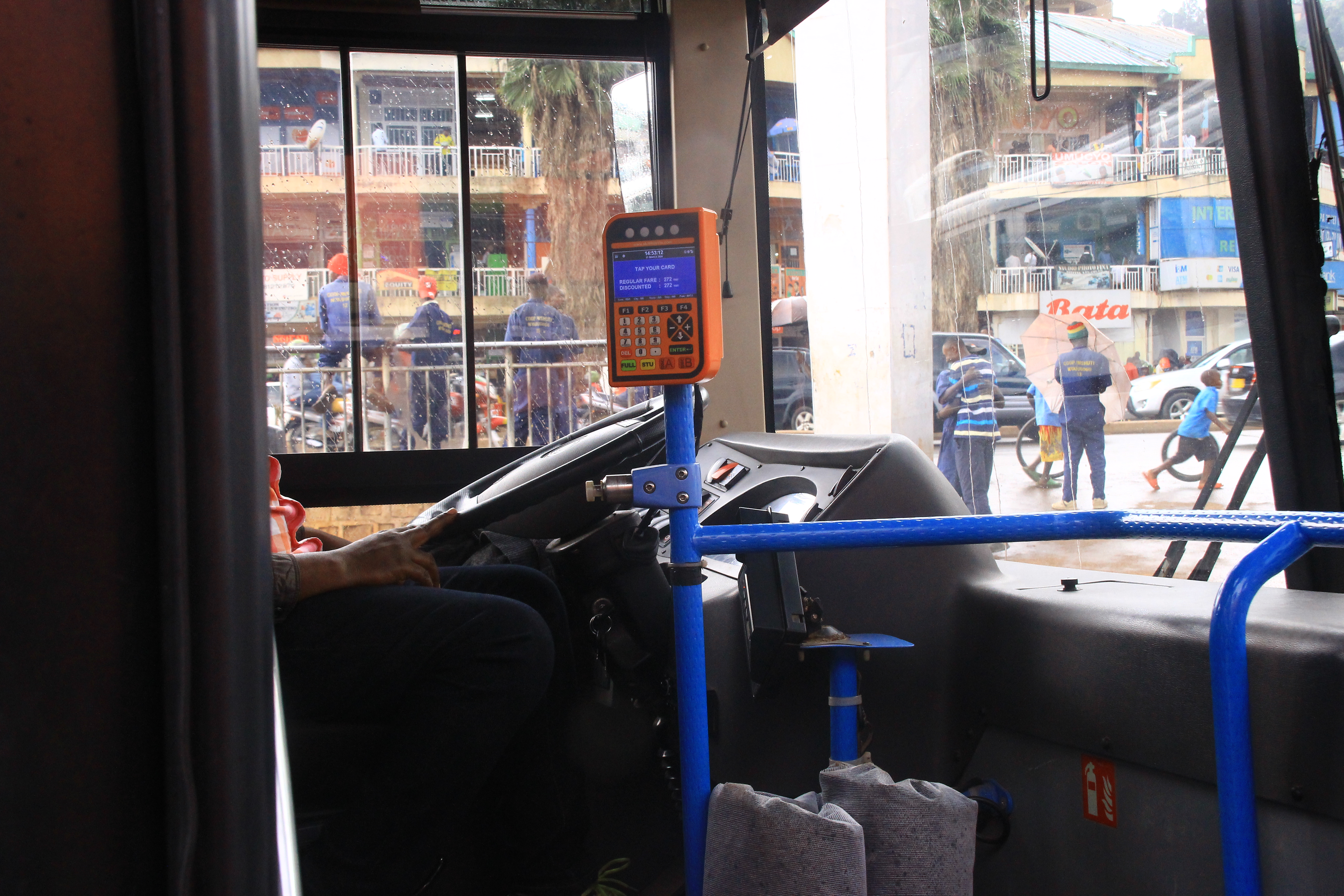
Tap&Go system used on buses.

Public transport in Kigali takes the form of the stopping share taxis mentioned above, but running much more frequently due to greater demand. While the national ones are typically unmarked, Kigali taxis have a yellow stripe running round the vehicle, on which is imprinted the start and end points of its route. Most services start or finish either in the city centre or at Nyabugogo, the city's main national bus station.

A recent survey carried out by the Transport Companies Association in Kigali gives us the following statistics: There are 19 bus companies operating a total of 1633 buses of various makes, models and sizes in various parts of Rwanda. In Kigali City itself there are 622 buses operating. Of these 622, 90.6% of them are small Toyota Hiace vehicles, mostly more than 10 years old, and many much older. Of the larger type vehicles carrying up to 30 passengers or so there are 58 units of which 34.4% are new vehicles owned and operated by Kigali Bus Services Ltd.

== Air transport ==
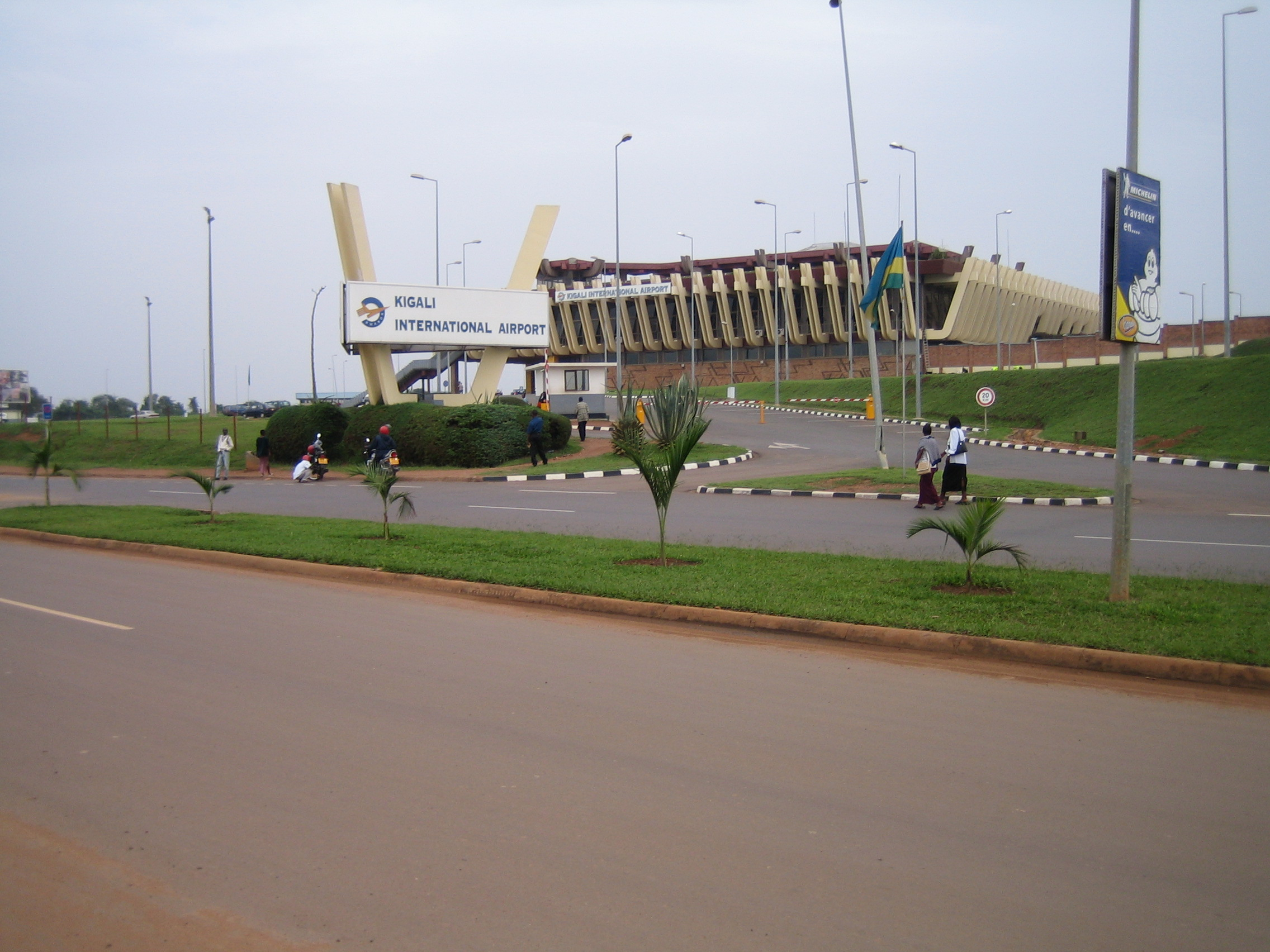
Kigali International Airport

The country's main aviation hub is Kigali International Airport, which is located at Kanombe, a suburb approximately 10 km (6 mi) from Kigali city centre. The airport has international flights to: Lagos, Brazzaville, Dubai, Nairobi, Entebbe, Addis Ababa, Bujumbura, Johannesburg, Amsterdam, Brussels and Doha and is the main airport for the national carrier RwandAir.

There are plans being discussed to build a new airport at Nyamata in Bugesera district, approximately 40 km (25 mi) from Kigali which would be larger and could act as a hub for the entire region. The only other airport in the country with passenger service is Kamembe Airport, which is in the city of Cyangugu. RwandAir operates a service between Kigali and Kamembe, which serves southwestern Rwanda and the Congolese city of Bukavu.

== Water transport ==
=== Lake Kivu ===
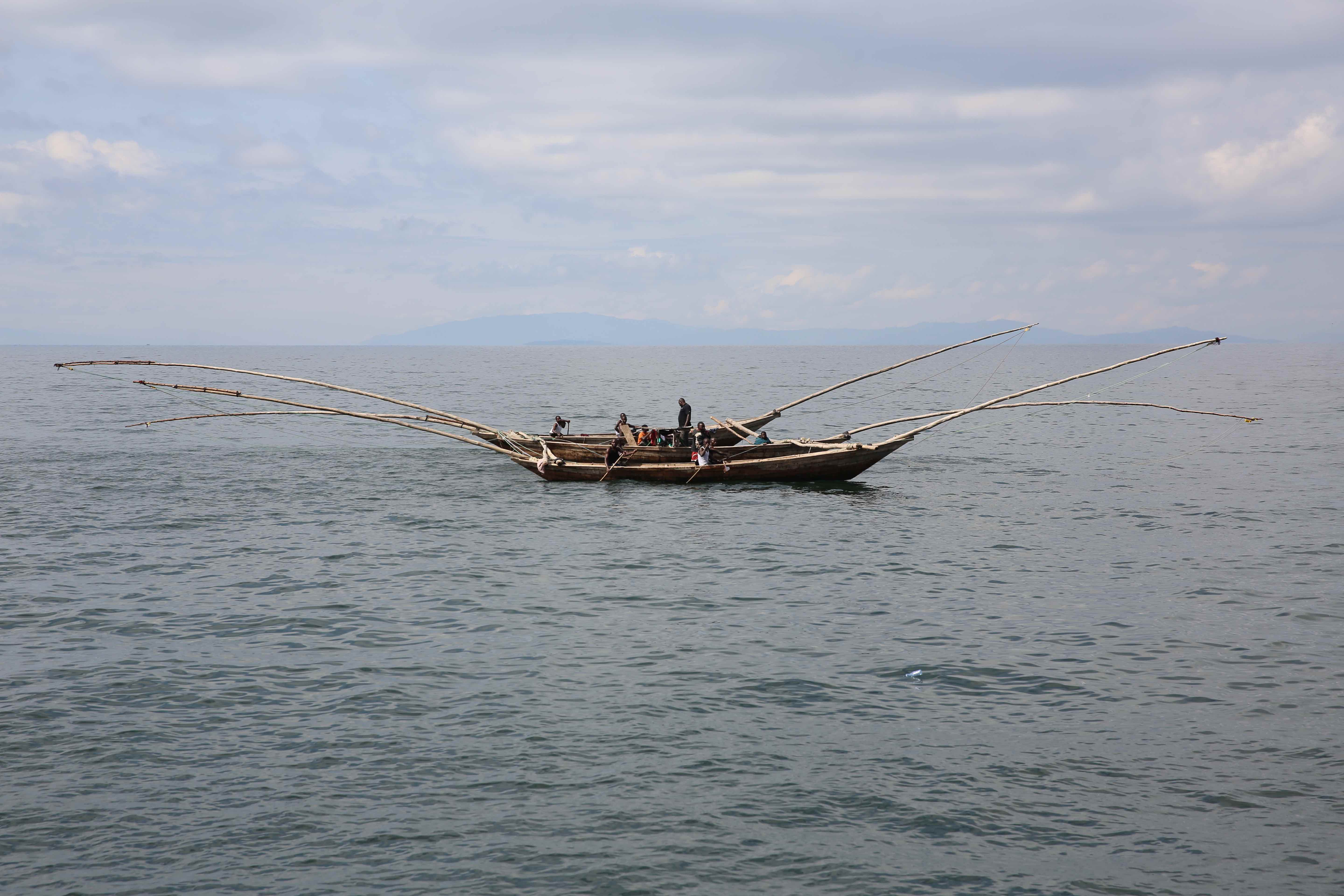
A traditional fishing boat on Lake Kivu.

This is by far the largest of Rwanda's lakes, forming the border with the Democratic Republic of Congo (DRC). There are occasional boat services between the major ports of Cyangugu, Kibuye and Gisenyi but these do not run to a regular timetable and often have to be chartered. There are also boats used to ferry people to some of the islands in the lake, but these also do not run regularly. Local fishermen operate along the entirety of the lakeshore, usually in dug-out canoes or other hand-crafted boats. The Rwandan navy operates a few boats on the lake to protect the country against infiltrators from the Congolese side.

=== Other lakes ===
Transport on Rwanda's other major lakes is mostly limited to ferries, usually local boats similar to those used to fishing, which transport people from one side to the other. Some lakes have resort bars and hotels, such as Jambo Beach on Lake Muhazi, which can offer a pleasure cruise to their customers in their own speed boat. Local fishermen operate on most lakes.

== Railways ==
There are currently no railways in Rwanda.

== See also ==
- Rwanda
- East African Railway Master Plan
