= Busengo, Uganda =

Settlement in Western Region, Uganda

- Map of Uganda showing the location of Busengo.
- Coordinates: 01°09′43″S 29°35′03″E
- Country: Uganda
- Region: Western Region of Uganda
- Sub-region: Kigezi sub-region
- District: Kisoro District
- Elevation: 2,044 m (6,706 ft)
- Time zone: UTC+3 (EAT)

Busengo is a settlement in the Western Region of Uganda. It is one of the urban centers in Kisoro District. The town lies across the international border from Busengo, Democratic Republic of the Congo.

== Location ==
Busengo is approximately 14 kilometres (9 mi), by road, northwest of Kisoro, where the district headquarters are located. This is approximately 89 kilometres (55 mi), by road, west of Kabale, the largest city in the Kigezi sub-region.

The coordinates of Busengo, Uganda are 01°09'43.0"S, 29°35'03.0"E (Latitude:-1.161944; Longitude:29.584167). Busengo, Uganda sits at an average elevation of 2,044 metres (6,706 ft) above sea level.

== Overview ==
At Busengo, Uganda the major road continues into the Democratic Republic of the Congo, through Busengo, DRC and it joins the N2 Road in Rutshuru. A smaller road travels north in the DR Congo from Busengo, Uganda, re-enters Uganda and loops back to Kisoro Town, passing to the east of Lake Mutanda.

Busengo, Uganda is the location of Busengo Primary School.

== See also ==
- List of cities and towns in Uganda
