= Imidugudu =

Imidugudu, meaning villages (sing. umudugudu), are the smallest administrative divisions of Rwanda. Imidugudu are the result of a forced villagization program that was launched on 13 December 1996 by a decision of the Rwandan Cabinet which set out to concentrate the entire rural population in such villages.

Rwanda today has more than 14,000 imidugudu, each of which houses about a hundred families.

== Background ==
In the aftermath of the Rwandan Civil War and the subsequent genocide of 1994, Rwanda experienced an influx of an estimated 1 million so-called 'old caseload' refugees following in the trails of Rwanda Patriotic Front's victory. These were mainly Tutsi exiles who had fled earlier outbursts of violence decades earlier. However, the need for housing was not immediate thanks to an exodus of 'new caseload' refugees accompanying the end of the genocide. This changed following the Rwandese invasion of Zaire in September 1996 which precipitated the First Congo War, after which hundreds of thousands of new caseload refugees were repatriated.

== Implementation ==
The Imidugudu program was initially launched in order to make better use of land and to ensure the obedience of the populace. It was later reorganized twice, first to cater for the needs of the returning new caseload refugees, and then as a security measure to cope with an insurgency in Rwanda's northwestern region in 1997–1998.

The program was implemented with substantial support from organizations such as the UNHCR and numerous NGOs. These international organizations helped to build 250 communities with 85,000 houses in the four years following the start of the program. Many more were built with local means only.

== Criticism ==
Human Rights Watch surveys have found that people's approval for the Imidugudu program has varied widely depending on the location. In Cyangugu, a prefecture on the Congolese border, about half of the people surveyed by a Dutch NGO supported the resettlement. Only 7 percent of residents in Gitarama were willing to move, however. In concluding a report on the Imidugudu program from 2001 titled Uprooting The Rural Poor In Rwanda, Human Rights Watch wrote:

The imidugudu program, generally understood by international actors to address the housing crisis, encapsulated also an effort to deal with the broader issues of economic development. Whether rural reorganization offers an effective solution to this major problem is debatable. What is not debatable is that the implementation of this program resulted in human rights abuses for tens of thousands of Rwandans.
