= Rulindo District =

District in Rwanda

Coordinates: 1°44′S 30°00′E

- District
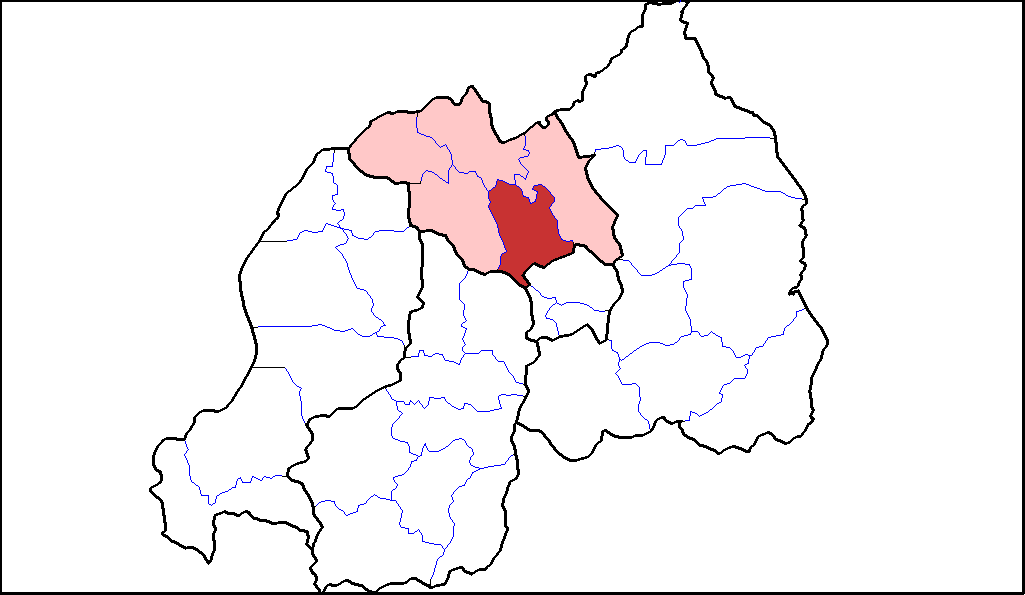
- Shown within Northern Province and Rwanda
- Country: Rwanda
- Province: Northern
- Capital: Tare

Area
  - District: 566.7 km^{2} (218.8 sq mi)

Population (2022 census)
  - District: 360,144
  - Density: 635.5/km^{2} (1,646/sq mi)
  - Urban: 38,110
  - Rural: 322,034

Rulindo is a district (akarere) in Northern Province, Rwanda. Its capital is Tare.

== Geography ==
The district lies roughly halfway between Kigali and Ruhengeri, and is very mountainous, containing Mount Kabuye. Its principal town, Tare (more commonly known as Nyirangarama), serves as a rest and refreshment stop for most long distance bus services between Kigali and Gisenyi and Goma.

== Economy ==
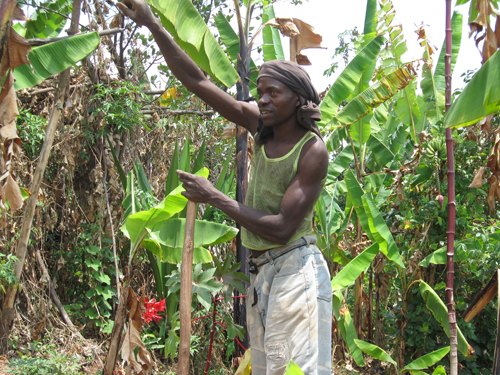
A farmer in Rulindo

Rulindo district is home to Agashya, Rwanda's leading manufacturer of passion fruit squash. Kinihira Sector is home to the Sorwathe Tea Factory.

== Sectors ==
Rulindo district is divided into 17 sectors (imirenge): Base, Burega, Bushoki, Buyoga, Cyinzuzi, Cyungo, Kinihira, Kisaro, Masoro, Mbogo, Murambi, Ngoma, Ntarabana, Rukozo, Rusiga, Shyorongi and Tumba.
