= Sebeya River =

Location
- Country: Rwanda
- Province: Western

Physical characteristics
- Source
  - location: Just south of Rurembo
- Mouth
  - coordinates: 1.705783°S 29.26083°E
  - elevation: 1,460 m (4,790 ft)
- Length: 110 km (68 mi)
- Basin size: 286 km^{2} (110 sq mi)

The Sebeya River is a river in Western Province, Rwanda that empties into Lake Kivu just south of the town of Gisenyi.

== Location ==
The Sebeya river originates in the mountains of Rutsiro District. It measures 110 km in length watershed includes 286 square kilometres (110 sq mi) of the districts of Rutsiro, Ngororero and Rubavu. It flows past the mission of Nyundo, established in 1901 on the banks of the river about 12 kilometres (7.5 mi) upstream from Gisenyi. Below Rubavu the river powers a hydroelectric system that provides electricity to the town of Gisenyi and to the local brewery.

== Mining operations ==
The Belgians began mining along the river in 1962. Later the mining operations were transferred to REDEMI and then to Natural Resources Development (NRD). There is some illegal mining. In 2012 all mining activity along the river was suspended due to environmental damage. The mining companies were mainly engaged in extracting Wolfram and Coltan. Their activity had polluted the river, and in some cases the river had been diverted. The mining releases large volumes of silt into the river, upsetting the natural balance. More than 300 employees lost their jobs for the duration of the ban. The suspension affected eight companies and mining cooperatives that had been violating environmental protection regulations.

== Conservation ==
Forests absorb and then gradually release water. The effect of upstream forest clearance and siltation has been to cause the river to flood over its banks onto fields and roads during the rainy seasons, and for insufficient water to flow during the dry seasons. In February 2010 plans were announced to expand the Gishwati National Conservation Park from 3,018 to 3,665 acres (1,221 to 1,483 ha), reforesting 647 acres (262 ha) of land in the Kinyenkanda area of Rutsiro District. About 150 families had moved into this area and cleared land on the steep slopes for small-scale farming. The result was rapid erosion, depositing silt into the Sebeya River. The families were relocated.

Efforts to protect the banks of the river from erosion by growing new trees are handicapped by residents who let their cattle graze near the banks, and by farmers who grow crops too close to the river. In 2013 the government provided assistance to families relocated out of the river protection zone, which was being rehabilitated. 42 families got new houses built by the government, and another 86 were given construction materials.
