= Gakenke District =

Coordinates: 1°42′S 29°47′E

- District
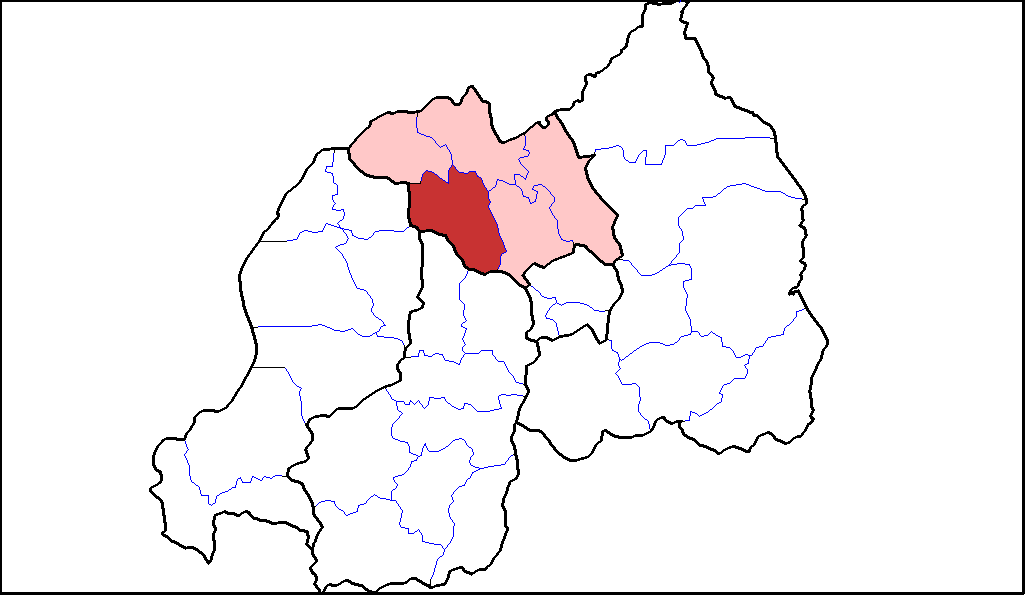
- Shown within Northern Province and Rwanda
- Country: Rwanda
- Province: Northern
- Capital: Gakenke

Area
  - District: 703.9 km^{2} (271.8 sq mi)

Population (2022 census)
  - District: 365,292
  - Density: 519.0/km^{2} (1,344/sq mi)
  - Urban: 14,788
  - Rural: 350,504

akarere ka Gakenke

Gakenke district is one of the thirty districts within the Nation of Rwanda. It is located in the Northern Province of the country. This district has started implementing a building plan with demarcation for land usage and public facilities.

== Sectors ==
Gakenke district is divided into 19 sectors (imirenge): Busengo, Coko, Cyabingo, Gakenke, Gashenyi, Mugunga, Janja, Kamubuga, Karambo, Kivuruga, Mataba, Minazi, Muhondo, Muyongwe, Muzo, Nemba, Ruli, Rusasa and Rushashi.
