= Musanze =

- Sector
- Country: Rwanda
- Province: Northern Province
- District: Musanze

Area
  - Sector: 32.9 km^{2} (12.7 sq mi)

Population (2022 census)
  - Sector: 47,720
  - Density: 1,451/km^{2} (3,760/sq mi)
  - Urban: 9,597
- (2012 census)

Musanze one of the sectors in Musanze District

Musanze is a sector, located in the district of the same name, in Northern Province, Rwanda, with a population of 47,720 (2022 census).
