= Kayonza =

- Town
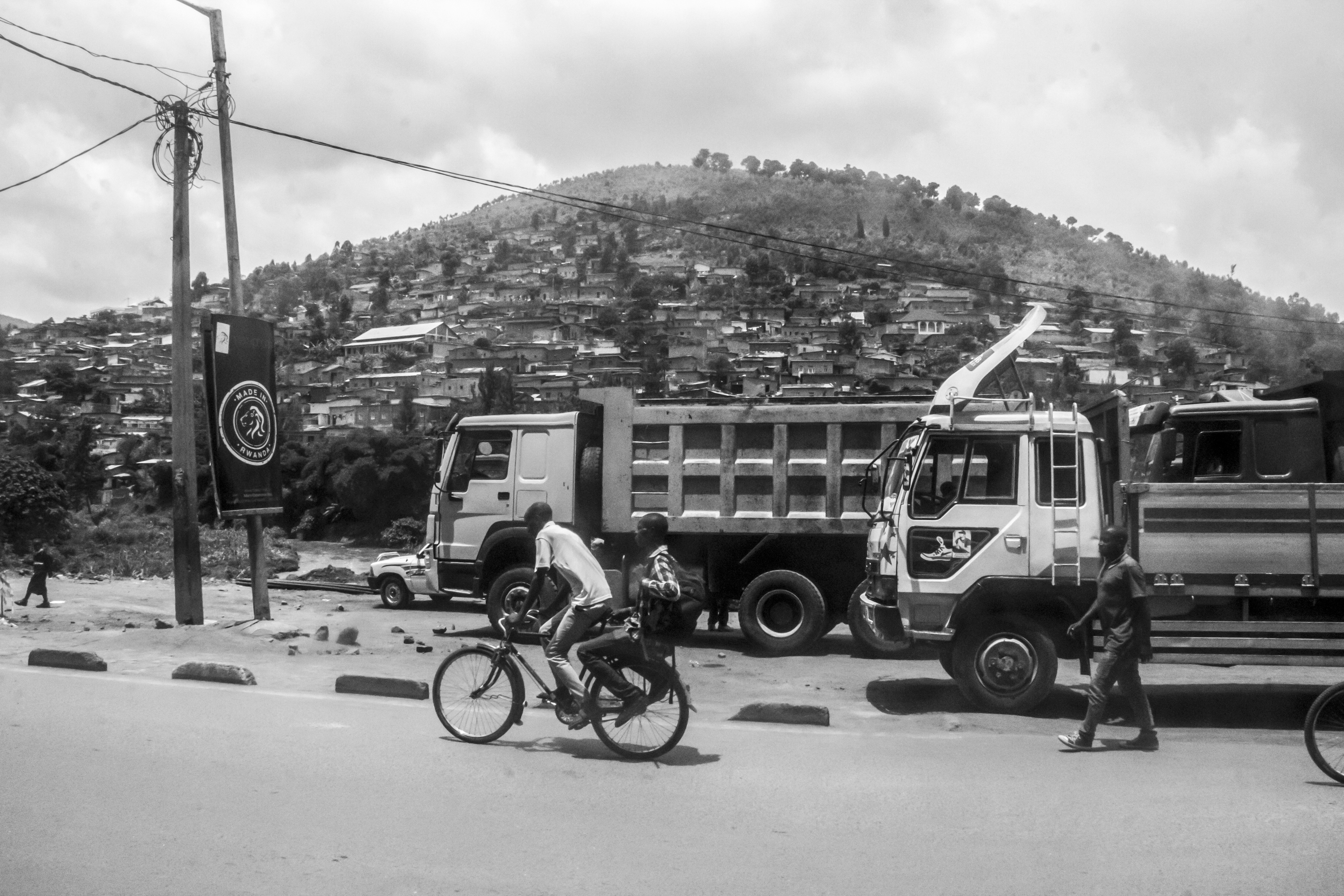
- Bike taxi driver takes commuter to his destination in Kayonza

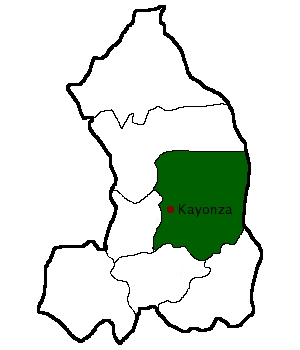
- The district and town of Kayonza in Eastern Province

- Location in Rwanda
- Coordinates: 1.90210°S 30.50729°E
- Country: Rwanda
- Admin. Province: Eastern Province
- District: Kayonza

Population (2012 census)
  - Total: 21,482

Kayonza is a small town in Kayonza district, Eastern Province, Rwanda.

The town is centred on a roundabout, where the road east from Kigali splits into the road running north to the Ugandan border, and the road south to Tanzania. It is a major transport hub because of this junction, where a sizeable taxi-minibus park and terminus offers the Okapi, Atraco and Stella express services. It is also used as an overnight rest stop for truck drivers from Tanzania to Kigali and beyond. A small hotel provides basic accommodation, and there are two petrol pumps, a conference centre, a twice-weekly market and various bars and television halls.

It is also one of the sites the company Zipline uses for delivering supplies to medical centres around the area using drones.

Kayonza now has a Women's Opportunity Center. It was designed by architect Sharon Davis, with funding provided by Women for Women International which is based in Washington D.C. The November 2013 issue of the magazine Architectural Digest shares the story and images from Kayonza.
