= Gicumbi District =

Coordinates: 1°37′S 30°07′E

- District
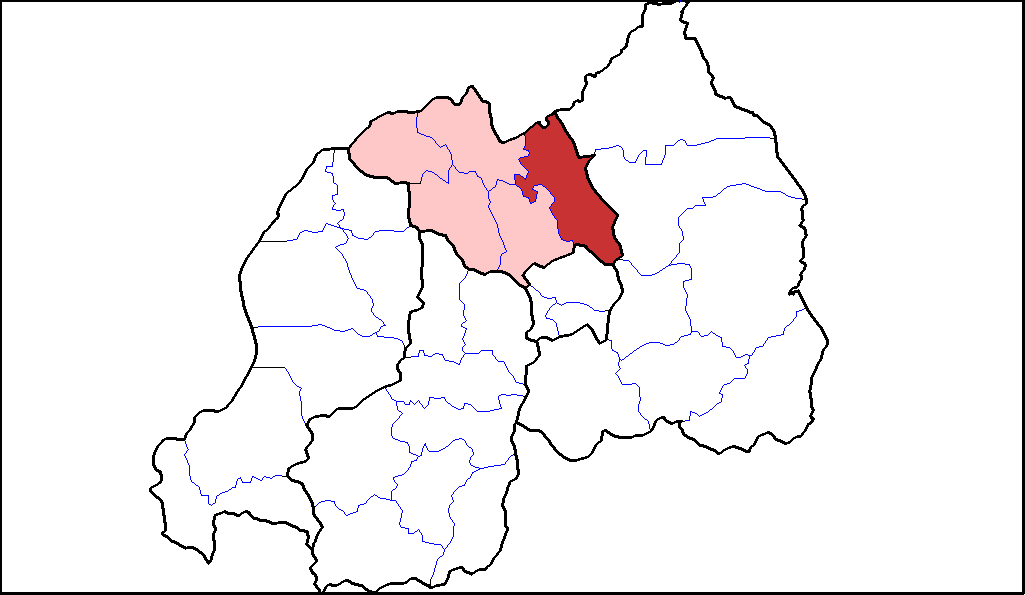
- Shown within Northern Province and Rwanda
- Country: Rwanda
- Province: Northern
- Capital: Byumba

Area
  - District: 828.9 km^{2} (320.0 sq mi)

Population (2022 census)
  - District: 448,824
  - Density: 541.5/km^{2} (1,402/sq mi)
  - Urban: 28,131
  - Rural: 420,693

AKARERE KA GICUMBI

Gicumbi is a district (akarere) in Northern Province, Rwanda. Its capital is Byumba, which is also the provincial capital.

== Geography ==
The district lies due-north of Kigali, straddling the major road from Kigali to Kampala. It is a hilly district.

== Sectors ==
Gicumbi district is divided into 20 sectors (imirenge): Bukure, Bwisige, Byumba, Cyumba, Giti, Kaniga, Manyagiro, Miyove, Kageyo, Mukarange, Muko, Mutete, Nyamiyaga, Nyankenke II, Rubaya, Rukomo, Rushaki, Rutare, Ruvune, Rwamiko and Shangasha.

== Gihembe refugee camp ==
Gihembe was a camp of Congolese refugees located in Gicumbi District and was home to 12,904 residents that are currently moved to Mahama refugee Camp in Kirehe District

On 15 December 2014, Gihembe Refugee Camp in Gicumbi District received a visit from Howard G. Buffett, who pledged funding to assist with repatriation of Congolese refugees.

== Climate ==
The Köppen climate classification subtype for this climate is subtropical highland climate or Cfb.

Climate data for Gicumbi, Rwanda (1961-1990)
Month	Jan	Feb	Mar	Apr	May	Jun	Jul	Aug	Sep	Oct	Nov	Dec	Year
Mean daily maximum °C (°F)	24.1 (75.4)	24.0 (75.2)	23.8 (74.8)	23.0 (73.4)	22.6 (72.7)	22.9 (73.2)	23.3 (73.9)	24.4 (75.9)	24.6 (76.3)	24.4 (75.9)	23.4 (74.1)	23.5 (74.3)	23.7 (74.6)
Daily mean °C (°F)	18.6 (65.5)	18.6 (65.5)	18.5 (65.3)	18.1 (64.6)	17.9 (64.2)	17.8 (64.0)	18.0 (64.4)	18.9 (66.0)	18.9 (66.0)	18.8 (65.8)	18.2 (64.8)	18.3 (64.9)	18.4 (65.1)
Mean daily minimum °C (°F)	13.1 (55.6)	13.2 (55.8)	13.2 (55.8)	13.1 (55.6)	13.2 (55.8)	12.6 (54.7)	12.6 (54.7)	13.3 (55.9)	13.2 (55.8)	13.1 (55.6)	13.0 (55.4)	13.1 (55.6)	13.1 (55.5)
Average rainfall mm (inches)	70.6 (2.78)	77.7 (3.06)	140.0 (5.51)	159.3 (6.27)	122.0 (4.80)	20.0 (0.79)	81 (3.2)	56.7 (2.23)	95.2 (3.75)	111.4 (4.39)	115.9 (4.56)	71.2 (2.80)	1,121 (44.14)
Average rainy days	9	10	15	20	15	3	1	6	13	16	16	12	136
Source: World Meteorological Organization

== See also ==
- Mulindi - Mulindi Tea Plantation, National Liberation Struggle Museum
