= Districts of Rwanda =

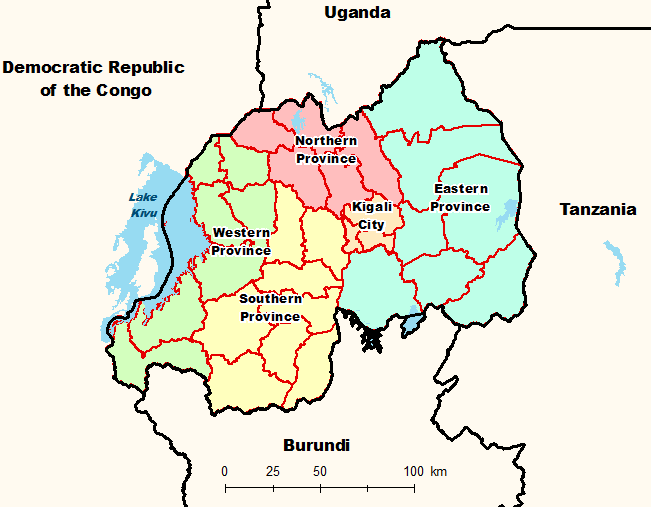
Districts of Rwanda

The five provinces of Rwanda are divided into 30 districts (Kinyarwanda: uturere, sing. akarere). Each district is in turn divided into sectors (Kinyarwanda: imirenge, sing. umurenge), which are in turn divided into cells (Kinyarwanda: utugali, sing. akagali), which are in turn divided into villages (Kinyarwanda: imidugudu, sing. umudugudu).

Prior to 2002, Rwanda was composed of prefectures, subprefectures (which were sometimes called "districts") and 154 communes (Kinyarwanda: imijyi, sing. umujyi). In 2002, communes were replaced by two kinds of divisions called districts and municipalities (Kinyarwanda: akarere and umujyi). In 2006, the number of districts was reduced from 106 to 30.

The districts are listed below, by province.

== Current list of districts by province ==
=== Eastern Province ===
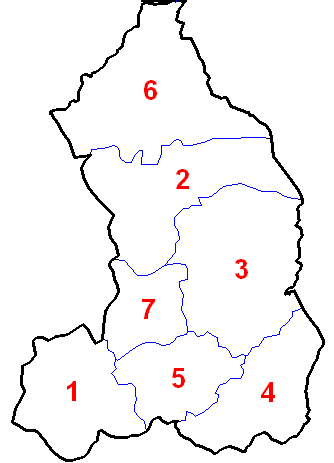
Districts of East province

1. Bugesera
2. Gatsibo
3. Kayonza
4. Kirehe
5. Ngoma
6. Nyagatare
7. Rwamagana also being the headquarters of eastern province

=== City of Kigali ===
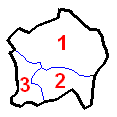
Districts of the City of Kigali

1. Gasabo
2. Kicukiro
3. Nyarugenge

=== Northern Province ===
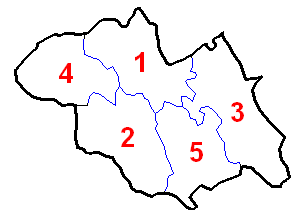
Districts of North province

1. Burera
2. Gakenke
3. Gicumbi
4. Musanze
5. Rulindo

=== Southern Province ===
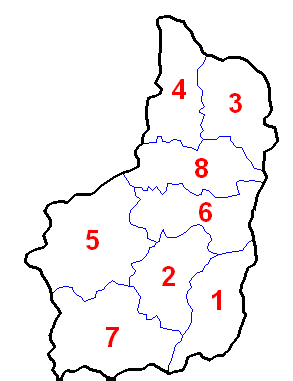
Districts of South province

1. Gisagara
2. Huye
3. Kamonyi
4. Muhanga
5. Nyamagabe
6. Nyanza
7. Nyaruguru
8. Ruhango

=== Western Province ===
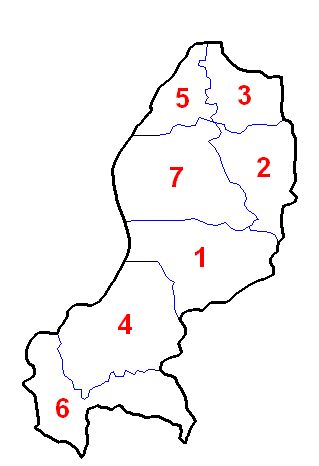
Districts of West province

1. Karongi
2. Ngororero
3. Nyabihu
4. Nyamasheke
5. Rubavu
6. Rusizi
7. Rutsiro

== Former list of districts by province (2002–2006) ==
=== Kigali City ===
1. Nyarugenge
2. Nyamirambo
3. Butamwa
4. Gisozi
5. Kacyiru
6. Kanombe
7. Kicukiro
8. Gikondo

=== Kigali Rural Province ===
1. Kabuga Town
2. Bicumbi
3. Gashora
4. Ngenda
5. Nyamata
6. Shyorongi
7. Rushashi
8. Rulindo
9. Buliza
10. Gasabo

=== Gitarama Province ===
1. Gitarama Town
2. Ruyumba
3. Ntongwe
4. Ruhango Town
5. Kabagari
6. Ntenyo
7. Muhanga
8. Ndiza
9. Kayumbu
10. Kamonyi

=== Butare Province ===
1. Butare Town
2. Save
3. Mugombwa
4. Kibingo
5. Nyakizu
6. Maraba
7. Kiruhura
8. Nyanza Town
9. Nyamure
10. Gikonko

=== Gikongoro Province ===
1. Gikongoro Town
2. Mubuga
3. Nshili kivu
4. Mudasomwa
5. Mushubi
6. Kaduha
7. Karaba
8. Rwamiko

=== Cyangugu Province ===
1. Cyangugu Town
2. Impala
3. Nyamasheke
4. Gatare
5. Bukunzi
6. Bugarama
7. Gashonga

=== Kibuye Province ===
1. Kibuye Town
2. Gisunzu
3. Rutsiro
4. Budaha
5. Itabire
6. Rusenyi

=== Gisenyi Province ===
1. Gisenyi Town
2. Cyanzarwe
3. Mutura
4. Gasiza
5. Kageyo
6. Nyagisagara
7. Gaseke
8. Kayove
9. Kanama
10. Nyamyumba

=== Ruhengeri Province ===
1. Ruhengeri Town
2. Bugarura
3. Nyarutovu
4. Bukonya
5. Buhoma
6. Mutobo
7. Kinigi
8. Bukamba
9. Butaro
10. Cyeru
11. Nyamugali

=== Byumba Province ===
1. Byumba Town1
2. Kisaro
3. Kinihira
4. Bungwe
5. Rushaki
6. Rebero
7. Ngarama
8. Humure
9. Rwamiko

=== Umutara Province ===
1. Umutara Town
2. Bugaragara
3. Kabarore
4. Gabiro
5. Rukara
6. Murambi
7. Kahi
8. Muvumba

=== Kibungo Province ===
1. Kibungo Town
2. Kigarama
3. Mirenge
4. Rwamagana Town
5. Muhazi
6. Kabarondo
7. Cyarubare
8. Rukira
9. Nyarubuye
10. Rusumo

== Communes of Rwanda (pre-2002) ==
Communes of Rwanda in 1983. The only difference from 1994 is the prefecture of Kigali-Ville, which was created in 1990.

Communes of Rwanda in 1994.

Communes of Rwanda after the formation of Umutara prefecture in 1996.

== See also ==
- List of Rwanda districts by population
- Provinces of Rwanda
