= Northern Province, Rwanda =

Province of Rwanda

Northern Province
- Province
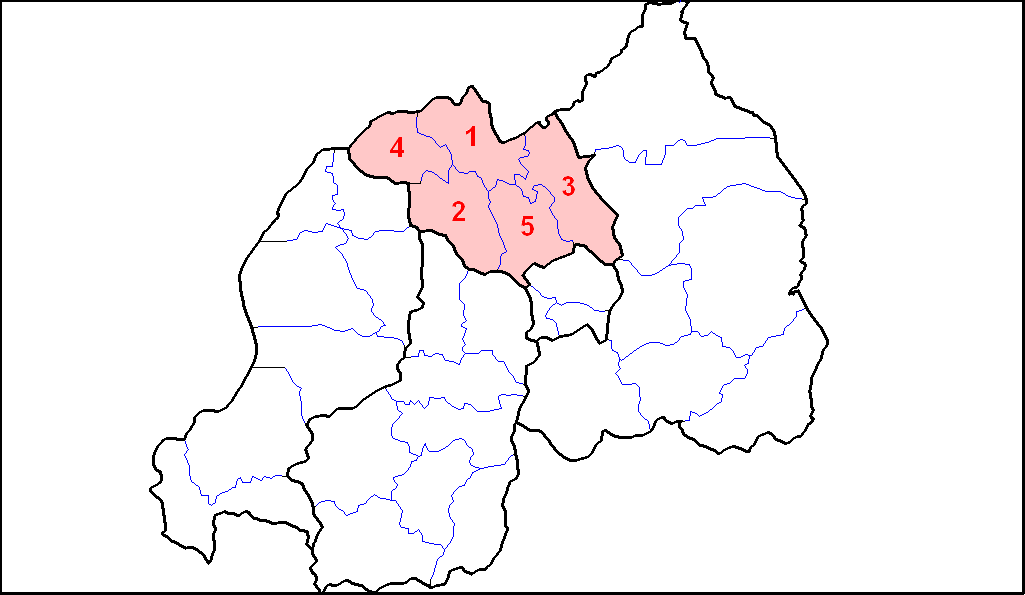
- Coordinates: 1°34′5″S 29°54′37″E
- Country: Rwanda
- Formed: 2006
- Capital: Byumba
- Districts: List: Burera; Gakenke; Gicumbi; Musanze; Rulindo

Government
  - Governor: Maurice Mugabowagahunde

Area
  - Province: 3,276 km^{2} (1,265 sq mi)

Population (2022 census)
  - Province: 2,038,511
  - Density: 622.3/km^{2} (1,612/sq mi)
  - Urban: 353,729
  - Rural: 1,684,782
- Time zone: UTC+02:00 (CAT)
- ISO 3166 code: RW-03
- Other settlements: Ruhengeri
- HDI (2023): 0.555 medium · 5th of 5
- Website: www.northernprovince.gov.rw

Religion in Northern Province (2012 Census)
1. Roman Catholic (56.8%)
2. Protestant (28.3%)
3. Seventh-day Adventist (9.80%)
4. Muslim (0.80%)
5. Jehovah Witness (0.50%)
6. No Religion (2.50%)
7. Other (0.20%)
8. Not Stated (1.00%)

Northern Province (Kinyarwanda: Intara y'Amajyaruguru; French: Province du Nord; Dutch: Noordelijke Provincie) is one of Rwanda's five provinces. It was created in early January 2006 as part of a government decentralization program that re-organized the country's local government structures.

Northern Province comprises most of the former provinces of Ruhengeri and Byumba, along with northern portions of Kigali Rural. It is divided into the districts of Burera, Gicumbi, Gakenke, Musanze, and Rulindo.

The capital city of Northern Province is Musanze.

The province's official languages are English, French and Kinyarwanda.

The governor, appointed by presidential decree, is currently Hon. Maurice MUGABOWAGAHUNDE.

The preceding governors of Northern province were Dancilla Nyirarugero, Gatabazi Jean Marie Vianney, Claude Musabyimana, Bosenibamwe Aimée, Boniface Rucagu, formerly governor of Ruhengeri Province.
