= 2020 East Africa floods =

Persistent floods from torrential raining in East Africa

- Date: March–May 2020
- Location: Rwanda Kenya Somalia Burundi Ethiopia Uganda Democratic Republic of the Congo Djibouti Tanzania
- Deaths: 453 in total: 237 in Kenya; 97 in Rwanda; 44 in the Democratic Republic of the Congo; 34 in Ethiopia; 21 in Somalia; 11 in Uganda; 8 in Djibouti; 1 in Burundi

The 2020 East Africa floods were a natural disaster in Rwanda, Kenya, Somalia, Burundi, Ethiopia, Uganda, Democratic Republic of Congo, Djibouti and Tanzania, affecting at least 700,000 people. They began when excessive rains began falling in March, leading to massive flooding and landslides. They caused more than 430 deaths, notably in Kenya and Rwanda. In the fall another round of floods hit the African Sahel.

Floods are the most frequent type of natural disaster and occur when an overflow of water submerges land that is usually dry. Floods are often caused by heavy rainfall, rapid snowmelt or a storm surge from a tropical cyclone or tsunami in coastal areas. Disastrous floods have caused millions of fatalities in the twentieth century, tens of billions of dollars of direct economic loss each year, and significant disruption to global trade.

== Impact by country ==
=== Rwanda ===
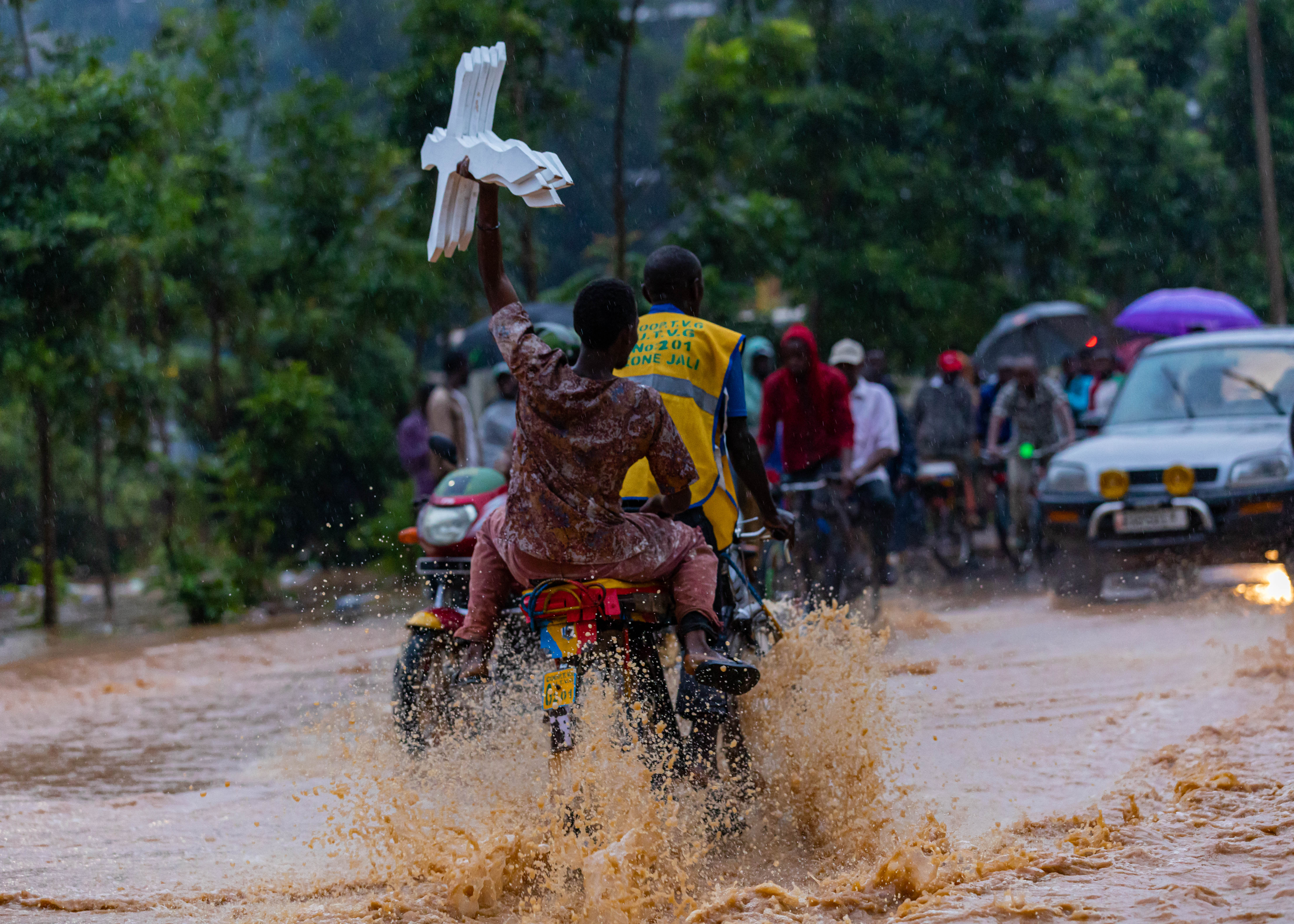
A bicycle rider carrying a passenger with crosses hustles his way through a flooded road in Kigali on 28 January 2020. Emmanuel Kwizera

Heavy rain, lighting and thunderstorms affected the country between 2 and 4 March, causing 5 fatalities, with floods reported in Kigali and Southern provinces. Two people died in flooding in Ruhango district, Southern Province and one person in Gasabo District, Kigali City. One person also died as a result of lightning strikes in Rulindo district, Northern Province and another one in Nyanza District, Southern Province. A total of 13 people were injured and 42 houses destroyed. Roads and bridges were also damaged or destroyed. On 7 March 5 people died after heavy rain caused a river to overflow and flood a cave in Nyamagabe district in Southern Province.

In April, 6 people died after heavy rain triggered landslides in Gicumbi district in Northern Province. The worst affected areas are Nyankenke and Kageyo Sectors. Property, infrastructure and livestock have all been damaged or destroyed. Authorities urged residents in high-risk zones to relocate to safer areas. Heavy rain also affected parts of Eastern province 19 and 20 April where media said at least 3 people had died in separate flood incidents in Gatsibo district. Flooding has also caused damage to crops in the district.

Heavy rain across the country from 1 to 3 May caused severe damages and 8 fatalities. 70 people have died in floods and landslides after torrential rain. The Byimana weather station in Ruhango District recorded 140 mm of rainfall in 24 hours on 7 May. The rain and floods also destroyed 91 houses, 5 bridges, and washed away crops.

=== Kenya ===
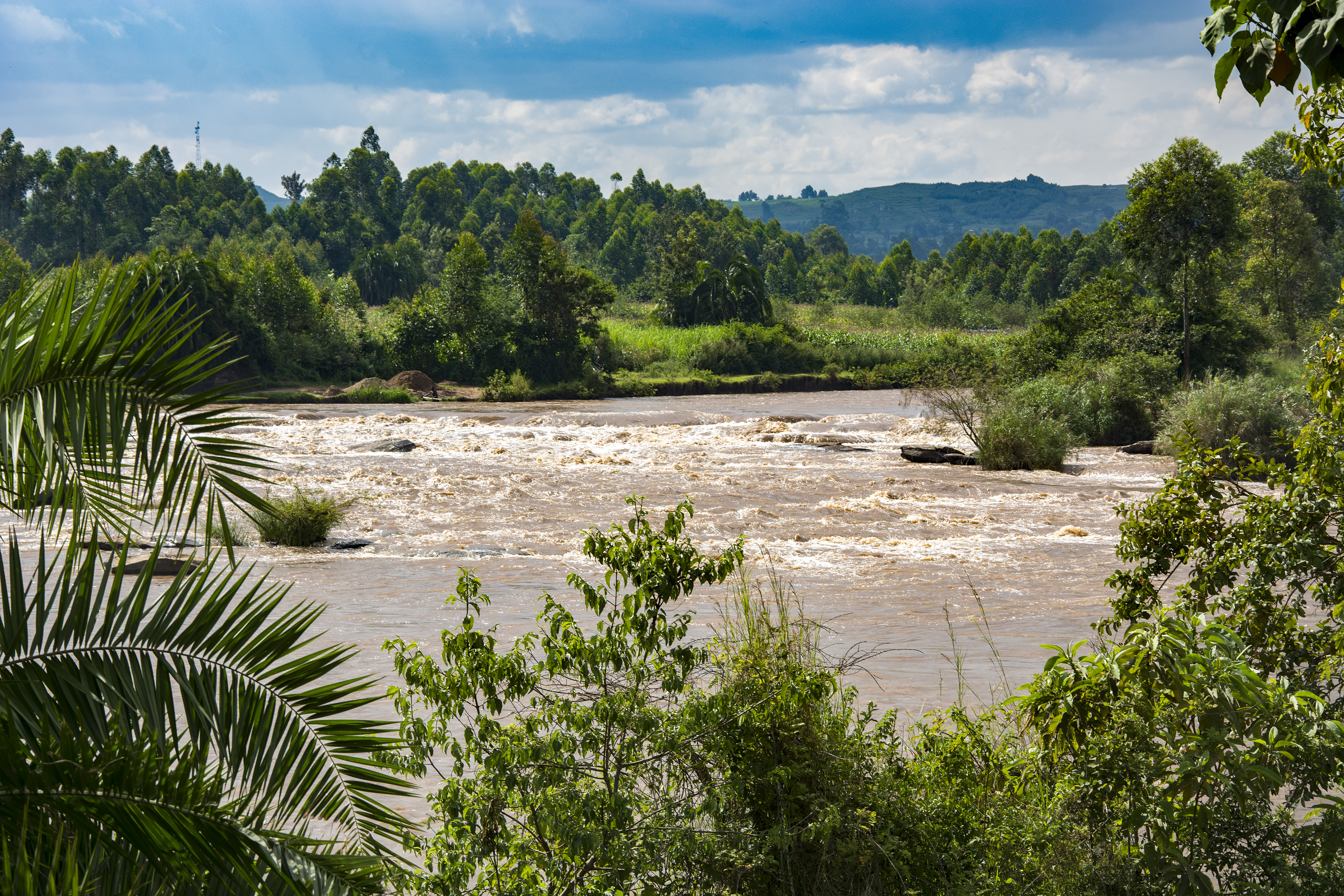
Nzoia river, July 2016

237 people have died in flooding in Kenya in April and May while over 100,000 have been displaced. Flooding has affected 29 of the country's 47 counties. Wide areas of land are under water in Busia and Siaya counties, western Kenya, after the Nzoia river overflowed. More than 800,000 Kenyans in 161,000 households have been adversely affected by the effects of the ongoing heavy rains.

Some of the effects of the 2020 floods in the country lead to displacements of people in Budalangi Constituency in Western part of Kenya who live at the shores of Nzoia River. In April 2020, extreme heavy rains caused landslide in West Pokot and Elgeyo Marakwet Counties which lead to death of 19 people, missing people, homes destroyed and dead of livestock.

=== Somalia ===
Heavy rain has affected wide areas of Somalia from 20 April, causing rivers to rise and flash flooding. On 27 April, massive flash flooding swept through the city of Gardo in the northeastern Bari region, part of the autonomous Puntland state. 16 people have died, 546,103 affected and 216,895 displaced. Hundreds of families have reportedly lost their homes. In addition five people died when the rain caused a house to collapse on 11 May.

=== Burundi ===
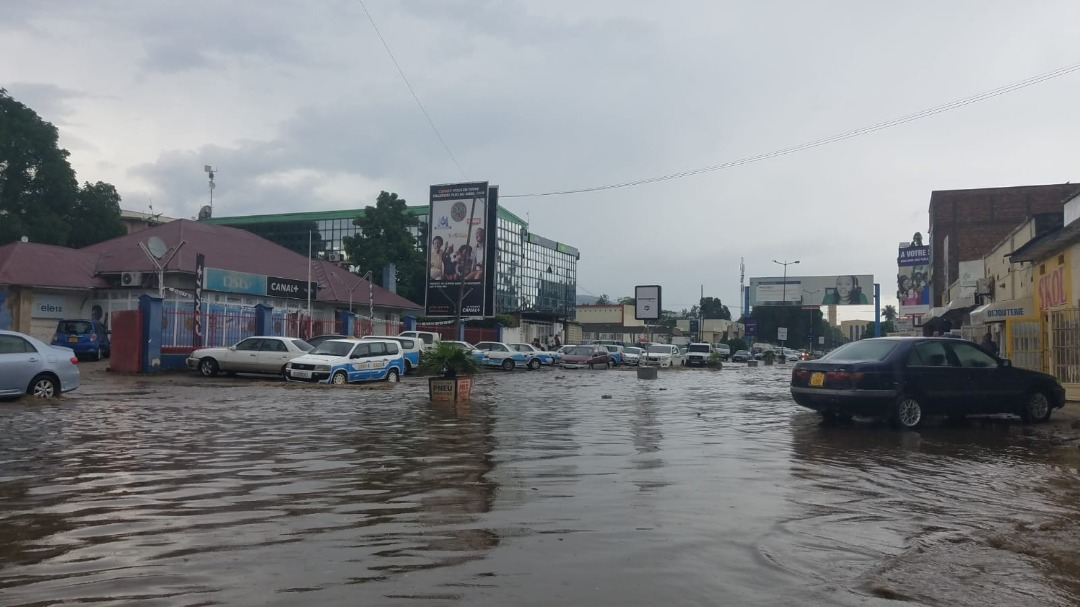
Flooding in Bujumbura, Burundi, December 2019

Burundi is susceptible to future water-related disasters, but examining the influence of climate change on regional hydroclimatic features is challenging due to a lack of local data and adaptation planning. 1 person died and 280 were displaced after severe weather in Burundi during the period 2 to 8 March.

=== Djibouti ===
8 people have died in flash flooding in Djibouti. Djibouti city and surrounding areas were the worst affected after flash flooding struck on 21 April after overnight heavy rain. The UN in Djibouti said initial estimates indicate that some 18,000 households (approximately 110,000 persons) were affected across Djibouti city and its suburb of Balbala.

=== Ethiopia ===
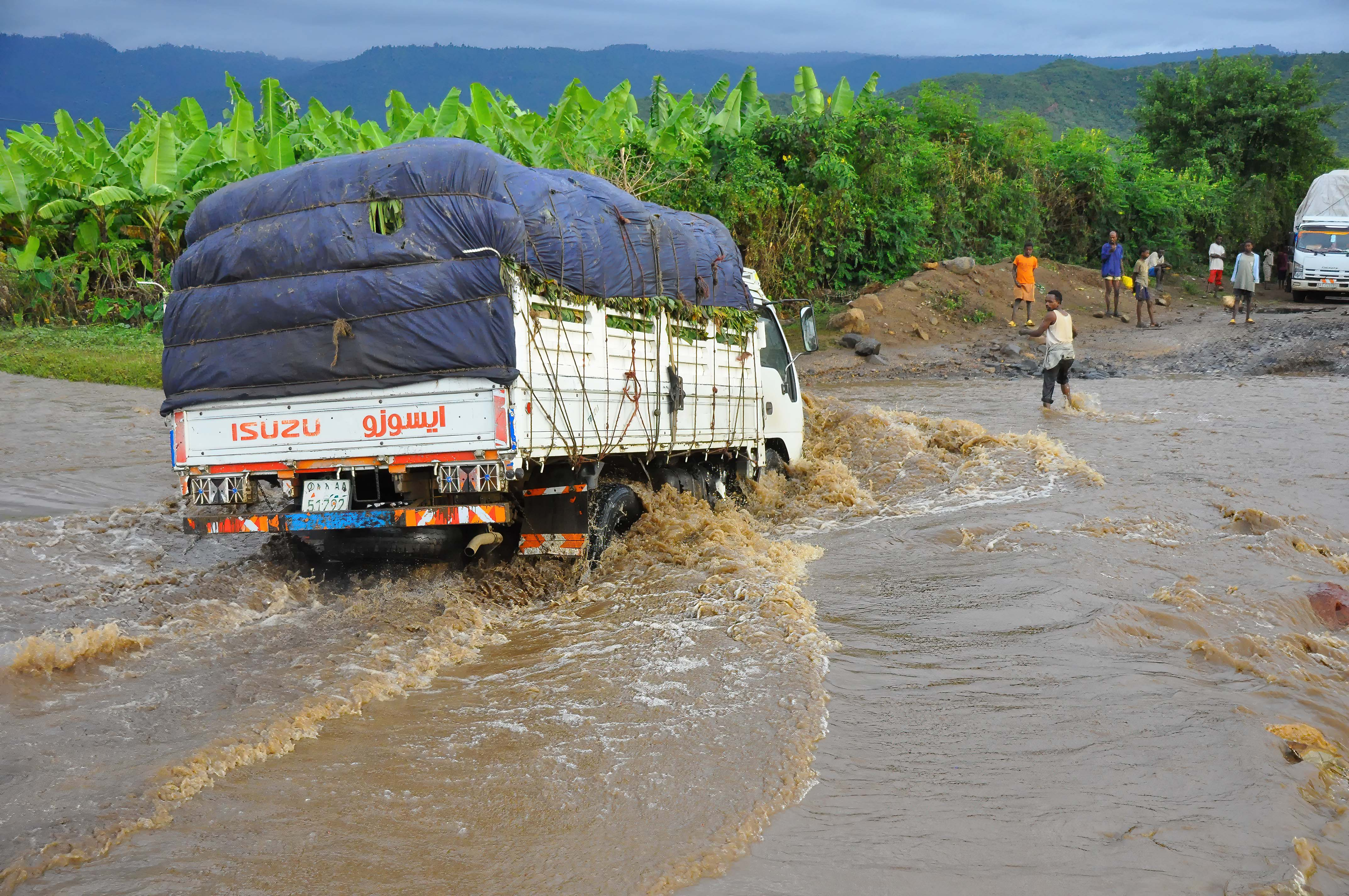
Flooded highway in Ethiopia

As many as 12 people are thought to have died in a landslide triggered by heavy rain in Ethiopia. The landslide struck in Ale Special Woreda in Southern Nations Nationalities and Peoples Region (SNNP). Six houses were completely destroyed and several families displaced. Seven bodies have been found, with 5 still missing. Search operations were continuing but has been hindered by unstable terrain. Eight people died in Gamo zone in a period 11 to 18 April. Flooding in Jinka town on 25 April damaged infrastructure and livestock. Other areas of the country have also seen heavy rain since late April. Flash floods on 24 April left at least 4 people dead in Dire Dawa. On 29 May landslide killed 10 people in Gamo Zone.

=== Uganda ===
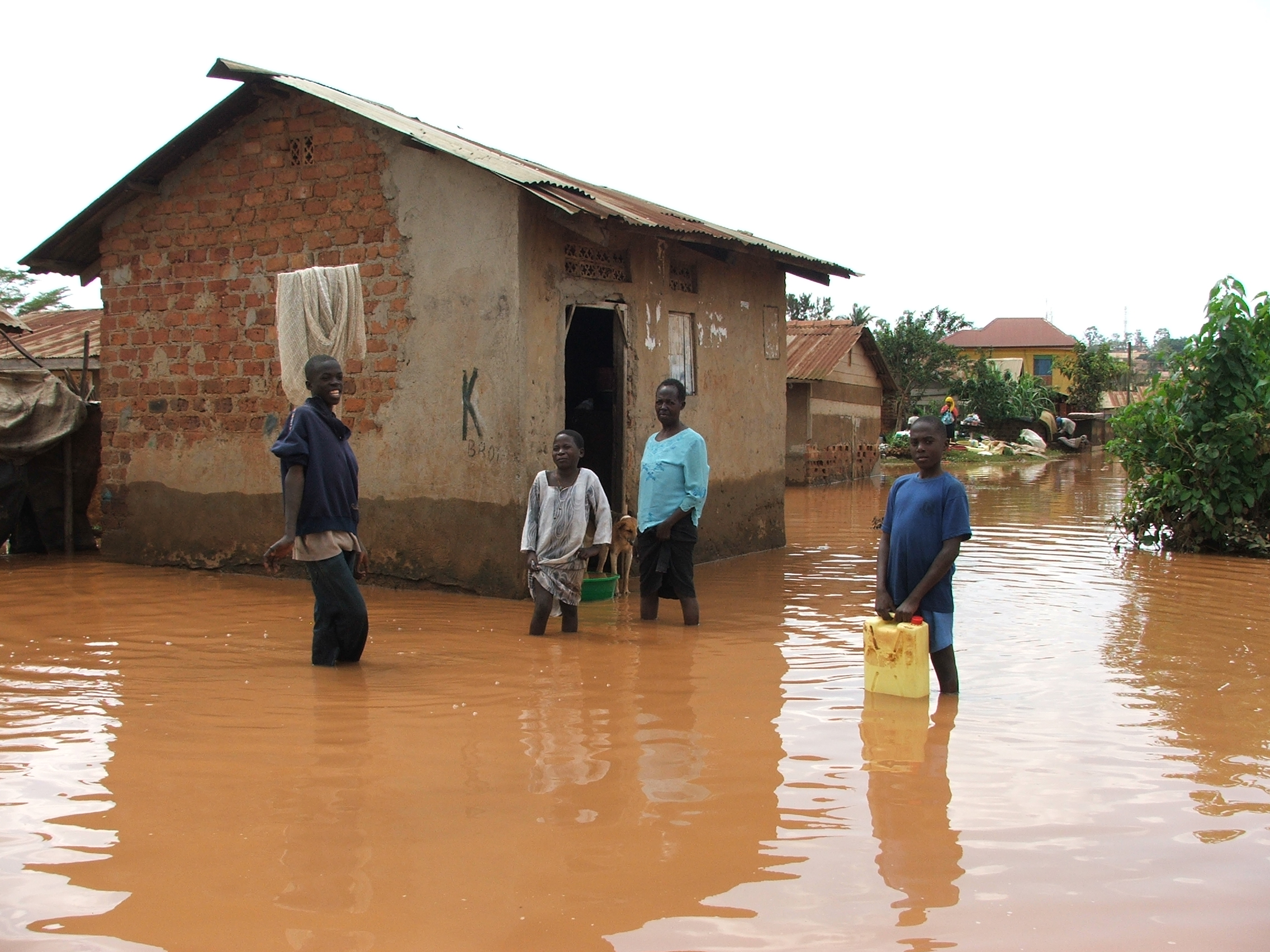
Flooding witnessed in Mukono District in Uganda

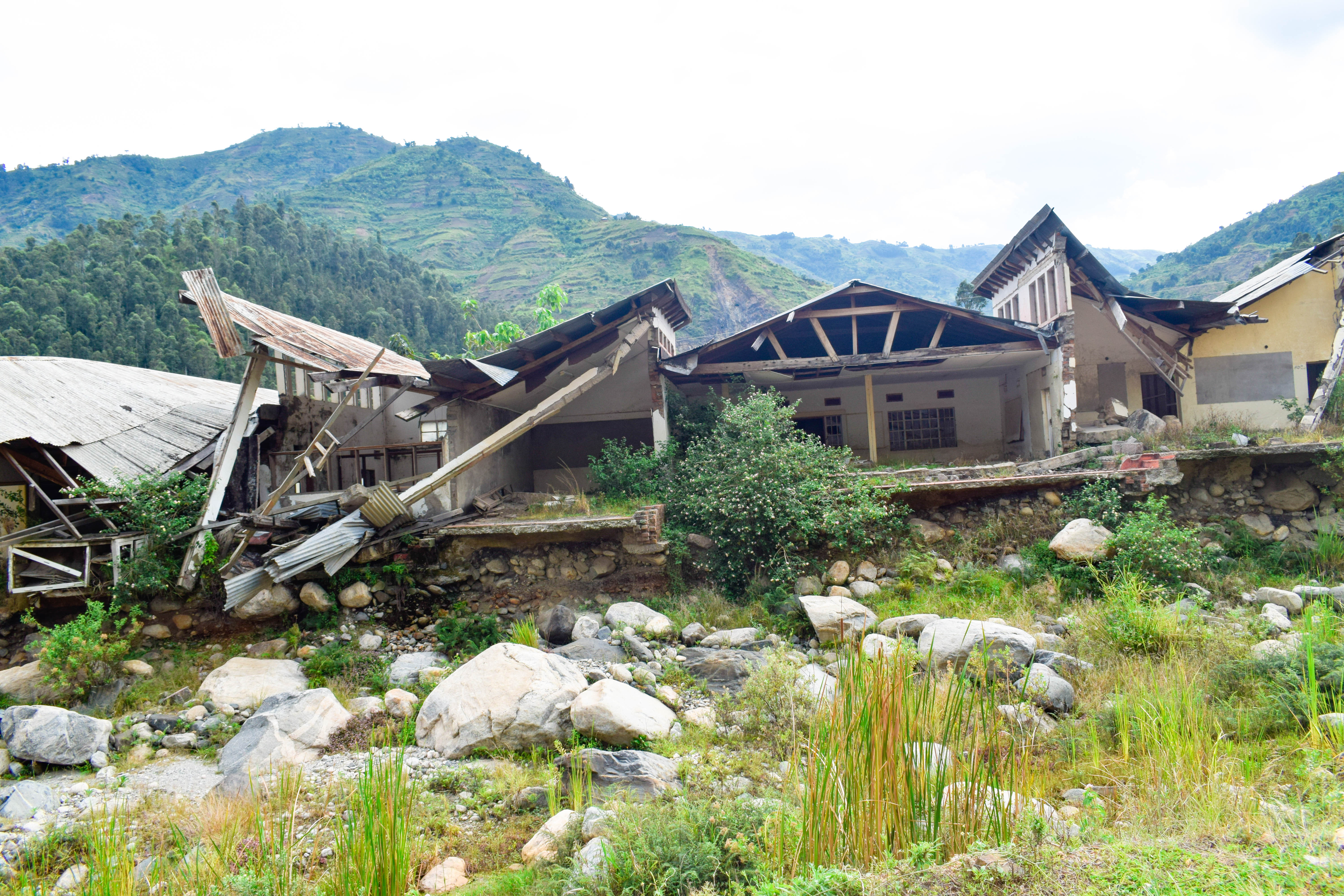
Destruction Caused by River Nyamwamba flooding in 2021 in Kasese District in western Uganda.

Thousands of people have been affected by flash flooding and landslides in Western and Northern Regions after heavy rainfall from around 1 May. Homes were destroyed and around 5,000 people displaced. Four people are thought to have died in the floods, with a further 3 people missing. Severe flooding and landslides occurred in Rubanda District, where 2 people have died and 31 houses have been destroyed. The landslides struck after hours of heavy rain on 2 May. Flooding in Kabale District in Western Uganda on 1 May damaged roads and homes. At least person reportedly died in the floods. About 500 families in Nakapiripirit district have been displaced and their crops destroyed following flood triggered by heavy rain on 2 May. Heavy rain over recent weeks has increased levels of Lake Victoria where more than 3,800 people on lake islands in Mayuge District, were told to evacuate as levels of the lake rose. On 21 May, 8 persons perished in new flash floods.

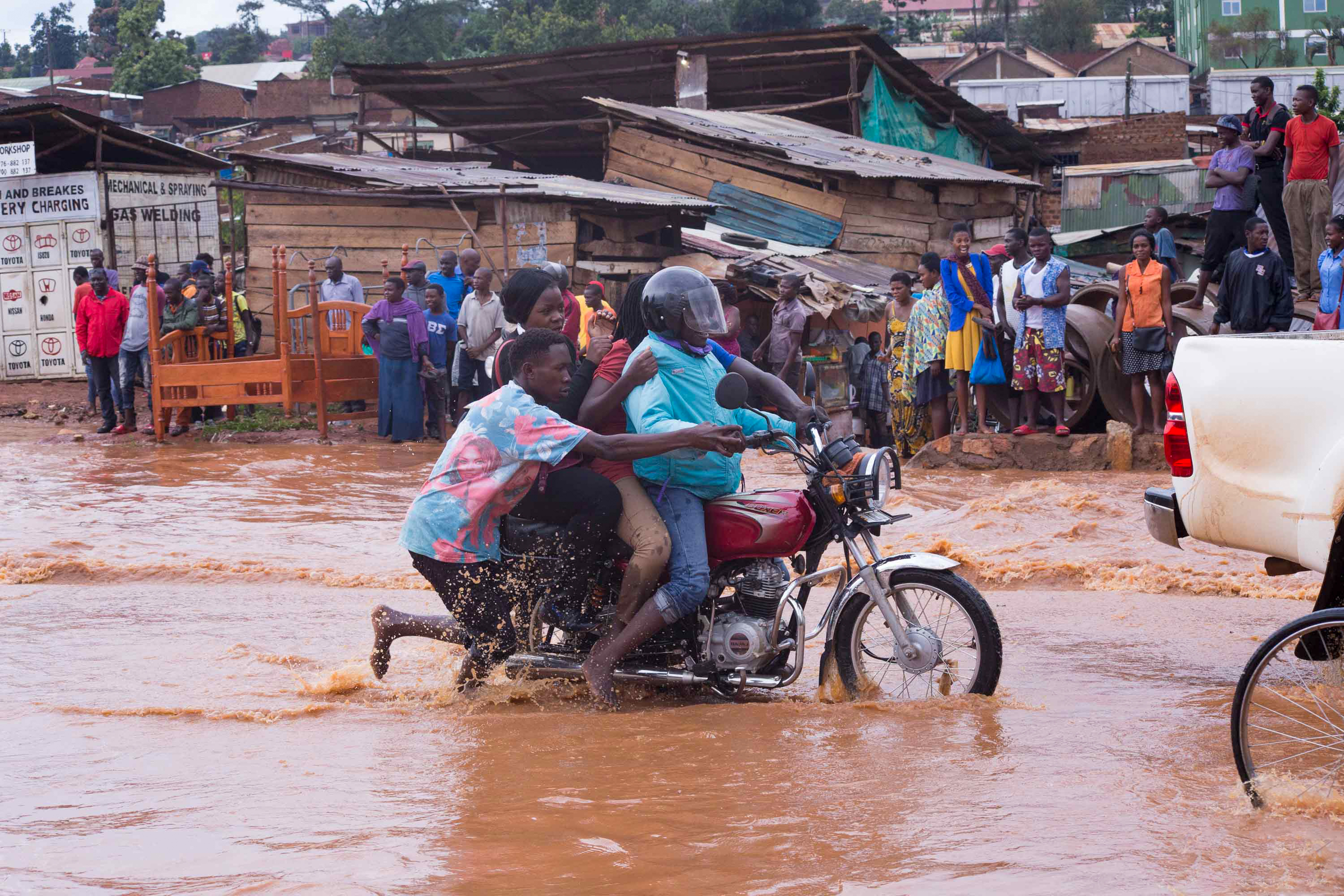
A flooding in Kampala around Bwaise in 2023

=== Democratic Republic of the Congo ===
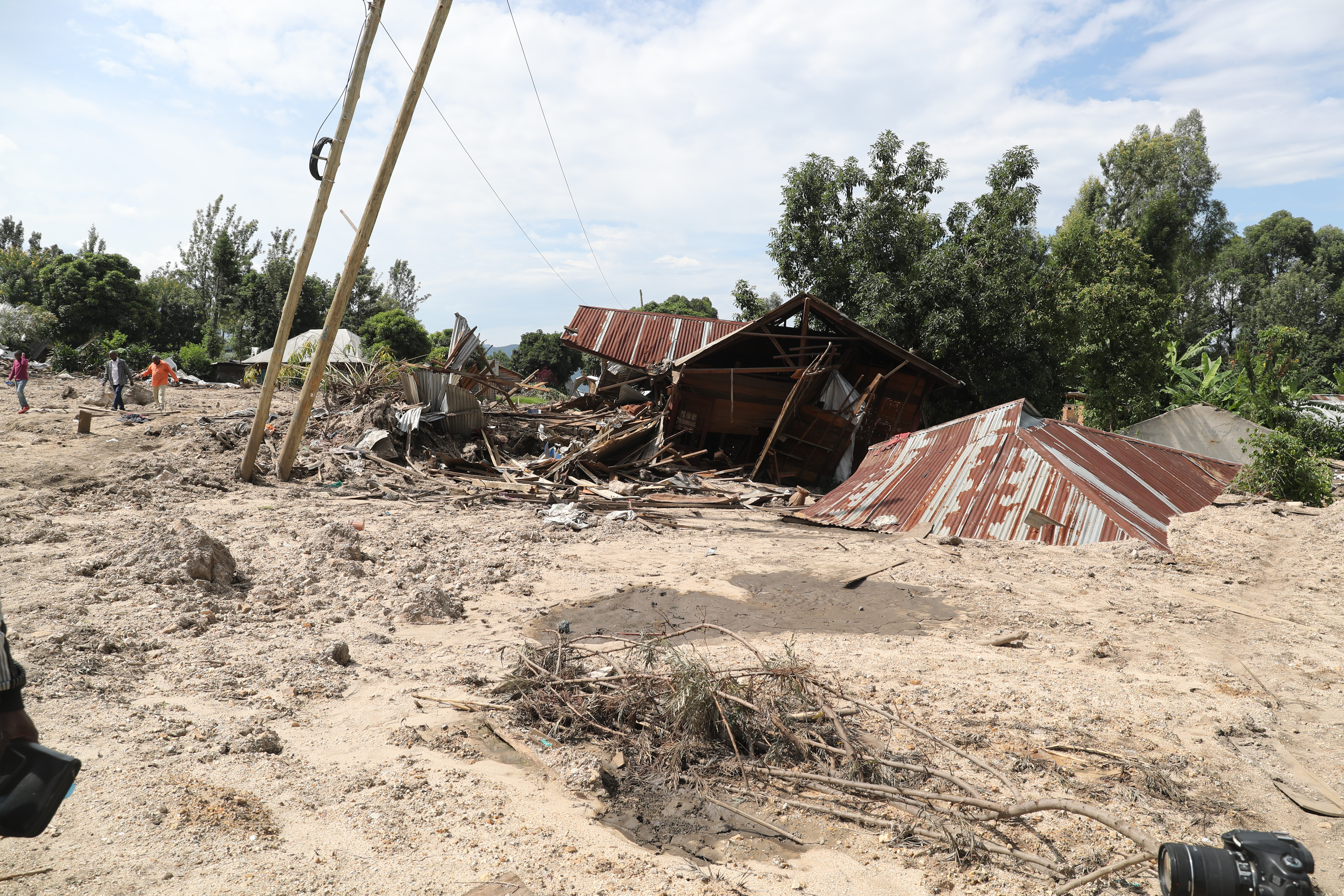
Kalehe, South Kivu, DRC: The Special Representative of the United Nations Secretary General in the DRC Bintou Keita was in Kalehe in South Kivu on 18 May 2023, where a natural disaster claimed the lives of several people on 4 May 2023. She was accompanied by the MONUSCO Police commissioner, the Head of office of MONUSCO in South Kivu as well as senior leadership of other UN agencies in the DRC. She visited the scene of the incident and met with local authorities and survivors. Photo MONUSCO/Michael Ali

44 people died, 200 were injured, while 64,000 were homeless in flooding in South Kivu Province. Torrential rain fell in the city of Uvira and surrounding areas in South Kivu, from 16 to 17 April.

=== Tanzania ===
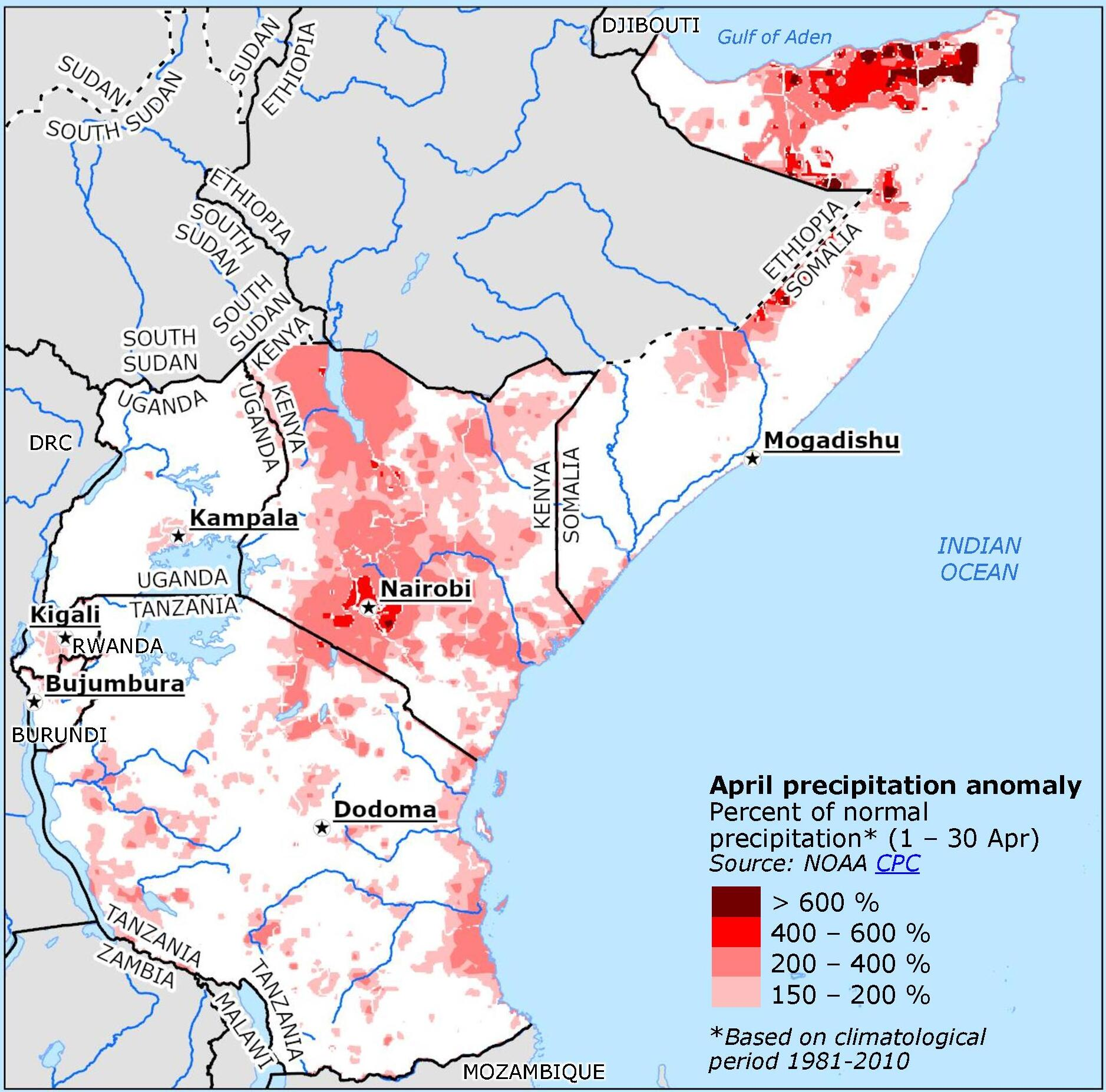
ECDM 20240507 Eastern Africa (cropped April precipitation anomaly

In April, thousands of people have been affected by flooding and mudslides in Arusha and Kilimanjaro, northern Tanzania. Two fatalities were reported in Arumeru District, Arusha Region, where at least 50 homes have been destroyed. Flooding has also blocked the important Arusha-Moshi road in Arumeru District, stranding hundreds of passengers. In Kilimanjaro region, more than 2,700 households in Moshi district have been made homeless by floods. Dozens of homes have been swept away by flash floods in Hai District.

== Causes ==
A positive Indian Ocean Dipole in October–December 2019 led to above average rainfall over East Africa during the 2019 October–December Short Rains. This was followed by above average rainfall in January and February 2020 (dry season). The 2020 Long Rains (March–May) also gave above average rainfall across East Africa - with especially high rainfall totals in March and April 2020. Over Uganda and western Kenya above average rainfall continued throughout June–September.
