= Miss Rwanda 2012 =

- Date: September 1, 2012
- Presenters: Charles Haba and Sylvia Gasana
- Entertainment: Gikondo Expo Grounds, Kigali
- Entrants: 14
- Placements: Top 5
- Winner: Aurore Mutesi Kayiranga; Southern Province
- Congeniality: Ange Uwamahoro; Northern Province
- Photogenic: Fidelis Tega Karangwa; Eastern Province

Miss Rwanda 2012, the third edition of the Miss Rwanda pageant, was held on September 1, 2012 at Gikondo Expo Grounds in Kigali.

The winner, Aurore Mutesi Kayiranga succeeded Grace Bahati, Miss Rwanda 2009. Grace Bahati was not invited to officially hand over his crown to his successor because she gave birth to a son out of wedlock. It's a taboo is very present in Rwandan culture.

== Results ==
Final Results	Contestant
Miss Rwanda 2012	Southern Province - Aurore Mutesi Kayiranga
1st Runner-up	Western Province - Natacha Uwamahoro
2nd Runner-up	Southern Province - Ariane Murerwa
Top 5	Eastern Province - Carmen Akineza; Northern Province - Francine Uwase

=== Special awards ===
- Miss Congeniality - Ange Uwamahoro (Northern Province)
- Miss Photogenic - Fidelis Tega Karangwa (Eastern Province)
- Miss Popular - Liliane Mubera Umutesi (Eastern Province)
- Miss Innovation - Joe Christa Giraso (Kigali)

== Contestants ==
Regional Title	Name	Age
Miss Southern Province	Aurore Mutesi Kayiranga	20
Miss Western Province	Ester Uwingabire	23
Miss Eastern Province	Liliane Mubera Umutesi	20
Miss Northern Province	Francine Uwase	19
Miss Kigali	Joe Christa Giraso	20
1st Runner-up of Miss Southern Province	Deborah Abiellah Isimbi	20
1st Runner-up of Miss Western Province	Natacha Uwamahoro	20
1st Runner-up of Miss Eastern Province	Fidelis Tega Karangwa	20
1st Runner-up of Miss Northern Province	Françoise Ingabire	21
1st Runner-up of Miss Kigali	Johali Nsengiyumva	19
2nd Runner-up of Miss Southern Province	Ariane Umurerwa	20
2nd Runner-up of Miss Western Province	Annick Umwamikazi	21
2nd Runner-up of Miss Eastern Province	Carmen Akineza	20
2nd Runner-up of Miss Northern Province	Ange Uwamahoro	20

== Contestant notes ==
- Carmen Akineza, had finished 1st runner-up of Miss Rwanda 2014.

== Crossovers ==
Contestants who previously competed or will be competing at international beauty pageants:

Miss FESPAM

- 2013: Southern Province: Aurore Mutesi Kayiranga (Winner)

Miss Supranational

- 2013: Southern Province: Aurore Mutesi Kayiranga

Miss Fashion Beauty Universal

- 2014: Southern Province: Carine Utamuliza Rusaro (3rd Runner-up)
