= Miss Rwanda 2014 =

- Date: February 22, 2014
- Entertainment: Petit Stade, Remera, Kigali
- Entrants: 15
- Winner: Colombe Akiwacu; Eastern Province
- Congeniality: Melissa Isimbi; Northern Province
- Photogenic: Yvonne Mukayuhi; Eastern Province

Miss Rwanda 2014, the fourth edition of the Miss Rwanda pageant, was held on February 22, 2014 at Petit Stade of Remera in the province of Kigali.

The winner, Colombe Akiwacu succeeded Aurore Mutesi Kayiranga, Miss Rwanda 2012. Colombe participated in Miss Supranational 2016 the third competition of beauty pageant all over the world, where she was ranked 17th among 75 countries. The first best ranking of Rwanda since its entry in this competition. Colombe is currently based in Paris where she is doing her career as a fashion model.

== Results ==
Final Results	Contestant
Miss Rwanda 2014	Eastern Province - Colombe Akiwacu
1st Runner-up	Kigali - Carmen Akineza
2nd Runner-up	Northern Province - Marlène Umutoniwase
Top 5	Southern Province - Mouna Dukunde; Southern Province - Hitayezu Belyse

=== Special awards ===
- Miss Congeniality - Melissa Isimbi (Northern Province)
- Miss Photogenic - Yvonne Mukayuhi (Eastern Province)
- Miss Popular - Yvonne Mukayuhi (Eastern Province)
- Miss Heritage - Marlène Umutoniwase (Northern Province)

== Contestants ==
Regional Title	Name	Age	Height (cm)
2nd Runner-up of Miss Northern Province	Grace Agasaro	23	170
Miss Kigali	Carmen Akineza	22	180
Miss Eastern Province	Colombe Akiwacu	19	178
1st Runner-up of Miss Southern Province	Mouna Dukunde	18	170
Miss Southern Province	Hitayezu Belyse	19	180
Miss Northern Province	Melissa Isimbi	20	173
2nd Runner-up of Miss Southern Province	Lydie Kayitesi	21	177
1st Runner-up of Miss Western Province	Anesie Mahoro	21	170
Miss Western Province	Vanessa Mpogazi	18	178
2nd Runner-up of Miss Eastern Province	Yvonne Mukayuhi	22	180
1st Runner-up of Miss Northern Province	Marlène Mutoniwase	22	170
1st Runner-up of Miss Kigali	Emmanuella Erica Urwibutso	19	170
2nd Runner-up of Miss Western Province	Merveille Uwase	20	173
2nd Runner-up of Miss Kigali	Nadia Uwera	23	173
1st Runner-up of Miss Eastern Province	Ruth Uwera	21	176

== Contestant notes ==
- Carmen Akineza, had finished in the top 5 of Miss Rwanda 2012.
- Vanessa Mpogazi, participated in Miss Rwanda 2015 but she unplaced. Later, she had finished 2nd runner-up at Miss Rwanda 2016.
