= Miss Rwanda 2018 =

- Date: February 24, 2018
- Entertainment: Yvan Buravan & Bob Pro
- Venue: Kigali Convention Centre, Kigali
- Entrants: 20
- Placements: 10
- Winner: Liliane Iradukunda; Western Province

Miss Rwanda 2018, the 8th edition of the Miss Rwanda pageant, was held on February 24, 2018 at Camp Kigali Grounds in the province of Kigali.

The winner, Liliane Iradukunda of Western Province succeeded Elsa Iradukunda of Western Province.

== Results ==
| Final Results | Contestant |
|---|---|
| Miss Rwanda 2018 | Western - Lilliane Iradukunda |
| 1st Runner-up | Northern - Shanittah Umunyana |
| 2nd Runner-up | Northern Province - Natacha Ursule Irebe |
| Top 10 | Kigali - Karen Umuhoza; Northern Province - Divine Ingabire; Northern Province - Paula Umutoniwase; Western Province - Fiona Uwase; Southern Province - Liliane Uwase Ndahiro; Southern Province - Lydia Dushimimana; Southern Province - Noriella Ishimwe |

=== Special awards ===
- Miss Congeniality - Southern Province - Liliane Uwase Ndahiro
- Miss Photogenic - Western - Liliane Iradukunda
- Miss Popular - Southern Province - Anastasie Umutoniwase
- Miss Heritage - Southern Province - Lydia Dushimimana

== Contestants ==
| Province | Contestant | Age | Height | Weight |
|---|---|---|---|---|
| Northern Province | Paola Umutoniwase | 20 | 1.72 m | 60 |
| Northern Province | Natacha Ursule Irebe | 18 | 1.72 m | |
| Northern Province | Divine Ingabire | 20 | 1.73 m | 55 |
| Western Province | Fiona Uwase | 20 | 1.70 m | |
| Western Province | Liliane Iradukunda | 18 | 1.70 m | 57 |
| Southern Province | Shanitah Umunyana | 19 | 1.84 m | 55 |
| Southern Province | Gloria Nzakorerimana | 20 | 1.71m | |
| Southern Province | Anastasie Umutoniwase | 18 | 1.80m | |
| Southern Province | Liliane Uwase Ndahiro | 21 | 1.74 m | |
| Southern Province | Vanessa Irazoke | 20 | 1.77 m | |
| Southern Province | Jordan Mushambokazi | 19 | 1.71 m | |
| Southern Province | Rebecca Umuhire | 19 | 1.70 m | |
| Southern Province | Noriella Ishimwe | 18 | 1.70 m | |
| Southern Province | Lydia Dushimimana | 19 | 1.70 m | |
| Kigali | Belinda Uwonkunda | 22 | 1.70 m | |
| Kigali | Karen Umuzoha | 19 | 1.73 m | |
| Kigali | Belinda Inganbire | 20 | 1.70 m | |
| Eastern Province | Charlotte Umutoni | 20 | 1.78 m | |
| Eastern Province | Solange Uwineza | 21 | 1.72 m | |
| Eastern Province | Shemsa Munyana | 19 | 1.81 m | |

== Judges ==
- Miss France 2000, Sonia Rolland
- Rwandan social entrepreneur and writer, Gilbert Rwabigwi.
- Radio presenter, Sandrine Isheja Butera
- Miss Rwanda 2016, Jolly Mutesi
- Economic analyst, Teddy Kaberuka
