= Gikongoro =

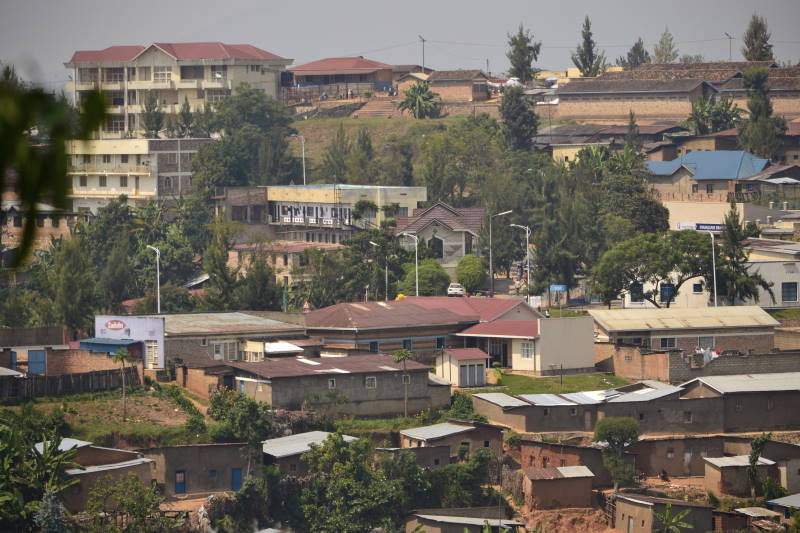

- Location within Rwanda
- Coordinates: 2.47231°S 29.58151°E
- Country: Rwanda
- Admin. division: Southern Province
- Elevation: 1,927 m (6,322 ft)

Population (2012 census)
  - Total: 16,695

Gikongoro is a city in Nyamagabe district, Southern Province, Rwanda.

It was previously part of Gikongoro Province, which has been disestablished. Gikongoro province was founded by the newly independent Rwandan state shortly after it gained freedom from Belgium in 1962. It was designed to undermine control of the Tutsi who had a stronghold in nearby Nyanza. Before the genocide in 1993, Gikongo city had a population of under 10,000. Human Rights Watch has described Gikongoro town and province at the time of the genocide as "largely incoherent." Local political leader Emmanuel Gapyisi was assassinated in 1993 and minister and PSD head Frederic Nzamurambaho was killed at the start of the genocide. Once the genocide began, the Tutsi population of Gikongoro was wiped out quickly compared to other towns.

The city has been growing in recent years, with a number of modern buildings constructed. The city is now called Nyamagabe. It is the gateway to Nyungwe Forest, a large area of montane rain forest, home to many species of monkeys and chimpanzees.

== Climate ==
Climate data for Gikongoro (1991–2020)
| Month | Jan | Feb | Mar | Apr | May | Jun | Jul | Aug | Sep | Oct | Nov | Dec | Year |
|---|---|---|---|---|---|---|---|---|---|---|---|---|---|
| Record high °C (°F) | 29.5 (85.1) | 29.2 (84.6) | 27.5 (81.5) | 27.4 (81.3) | 28.0 (82.4) | 27.9 (82.2) | 27.4 (81.3) | 28.2 (82.8) | 28.5 (83.3) | 28.1 (82.6) | 27.1 (80.8) | 27.0 (80.6) | 29.5 (85.1) |
| Mean daily maximum °C (°F) | 23.5 (74.3) | 23.6 (74.5) | 23.5 (74.3) | 22.9 (73.2) | 22.3 (72.1) | 23.1 (73.6) | 23.6 (74.5) | 24.1 (75.4) | 24.3 (75.7) | 23.3 (73.9) | 22.8 (73.0) | 23.1 (73.6) | 23.3 (73.9) |
| Daily mean °C (°F) | 18.3 (64.9) | 18.3 (64.9) | 18.3 (64.9) | 18.2 (64.8) | 17.9 (64.2) | 18.0 (64.4) | 18.2 (64.8) | 18.7 (65.7) | 18.7 (65.7) | 18.2 (64.8) | 17.8 (64.0) | 18.0 (64.4) | 18.2 (64.8) |
| Mean daily minimum °C (°F) | 13.2 (55.8) | 13.0 (55.4) | 13.2 (55.8) | 13.4 (56.1) | 13.4 (56.1) | 13.0 (55.4) | 12.9 (55.2) | 13.2 (55.8) | 13.2 (55.8) | 13.1 (55.6) | 12.8 (55.0) | 13.0 (55.4) | 13.1 (55.6) |
| Record low °C (°F) | 8.8 (47.8) | 6.4 (43.5) | 10.6 (51.1) | 10.3 (50.5) | 6.8 (44.2) | 9.2 (48.6) | 9.1 (48.4) | 6.1 (43.0) | 6.6 (43.9) | 6.0 (42.8) | 6.3 (43.3) | 8.4 (47.1) | 6.0 (42.8) |
| Average precipitation mm (inches) | 137.4 (5.41) | 130.7 (5.15) | 160.9 (6.33) | 198.1 (7.80) | 146.3 (5.76) | 36.0 (1.42) | 26.6 (1.05) | 47.8 (1.88) | 104.5 (4.11) | 145.9 (5.74) | 128.9 (5.07) | 148.4 (5.84) | 1,411.4 (55.57) |
| Average precipitation days (≥ 1.0 mm) | 13.8 | 12.6 | 15.8 | 18.8 | 11.9 | 2.5 | 1.8 | 4.1 | 9.4 | 15.6 | 17.5 | 14.6 | 138.4 |
Source: NOAA
