= Miss Rwanda 2015 =

- Date: February 22, 2015; 11 years ago
- Entertainment: Kigali Serena Hotel, Kigali
- Entrants: 15
- Winner: Doriane Kundwa; Northern Province
- Congeniality: Darlene; Southern Province
- Photogenic: Sabrina Kalisa; Western Province

Miss Rwanda 2015, the fifth edition of the Miss Rwanda pageant, was held on 22 February 2015 at Kigali Serena Hotel in the province of Kigali.

The winner, Doriane Kundwa succeeded Colombe Akiwacu, Miss Rwanda 2014.

Joannah Keza Bagwire, has finished 4th runner-up at Miss Heritage Global 2015.

== Results ==
Final Results	Contestant
Miss Rwanda 2015	Northern Province - Doriane Kundwa
1st Runner-up	Kigali - Vanessa Raissa Uwase
2nd Runner-up	Eastern Province - Lynca Akacu
3rd Runner-up	Eastern Province - Fiona Mutoni Naringwa
4th Runner-up	Eastern Province - Balbine Mutoni

=== Special awards ===
- Miss Congeniality - Joannah Keza Bagwire (Southern Province)
- Miss Photogenic - Sabrina Kalisi Ihozo (Western Province)
- Miss Popularity - Doriane Kundwa (Northern Province)
- Miss Heritage - Darlene Gasana (Western Province)

== Contestants ==
Province represented	Name	Age	Height (cm)
Northern Province	Colombe Uwase	19	170
Northern Province	Doriane Kundwa	19	174
Western Province	Darlene Edna Gasana	19	173
Western Province	Colombe Uwase	19	170
Western Province	Flora Mutoniwase	21	173
Western Province	Vanessa Mpogazi	19	179
Western Province	Sabrina Ihozo	21	175
Southern Province	Joannah Keza Bagwire	18	175
Southern Province	Joelle Ruzigana Giriwanyu	18	174
Kigali	Vanessa Raissa Uwase	22	171
Kigali	Belyse Hitayezu	20	179
Kigali	Jane Mutoni	18	171
Eastern Province	Lynca Akacu	18	180
Eastern Province	Fiona Mutoni Naringwa	20	170
Eastern Province	Balbine Mutoni	18	170

== Judges ==
- Cynthia Akazuba - Miss Kigali 2007 and Miss East Africa 2009
- Intore Massamba - Singer and musician
- John Bunyeshuli - Founder of Kigali Fashion Week
- Blanche Majoro - Fashion critic

== Crossovers ==
Contestants who previously competed at other national beauty pageants:

Miss Rwanda

- 2014 : Western Province: Vanessa Mpogazi
- 2016 : Western Province: Vanessa Mpogazi (2nd Runner-up)

Contestants who previously competed or will be competing at international beauty pageants:

Miss Heritage Global

- 2015: Southern Province: Joannah Keza Bagwire (4th Runner-up)
