= Miss Rwanda 2016 =

Sixth edition of the Miss Rwandan pageant

- Date: February 27, 2016
- Entertainment: Camp Kigali Grounds, Kigali
- Entrants: 15
- Winner: Jolly Mutesi; Western Province
- Congeniality: Ariane Uwimana; Eastern Province
- Photogenic: Peace Ndaruhutse Kwizera; Kigali

Miss Rwanda 2016, the sixth edition of the Miss Rwanda pageant, was held on February 27, 2016 at Camp Kigali Grounds in the province of Kigali.

The winner, Jolly Mutesi succeeded Doriane Kundwa, Miss Rwanda 2015. She entered Miss World 2016 but she did not place. This is the first time Rwanda has competed in the Miss World contest. The first runner up, Peace Ndaruhutse Kwizera, won the title of Miss Naiades 2016.

Miss Heritage Rwanda, Jane Mutoni, has finished 1st runner-up at Miss Heritage Global 2016.

== Results ==
| Final Results | Contestant |
|---|---|
| Miss Rwanda 2016 | Western Province - Jolly Mutesi |
| 1st Runner-up | Kigali - Peace Ndaruhutse Kwizera |
| 2nd Runner-up | Kigali - Vanessa Mpogazi |
| 3rd Runner-up | Eastern Province - Marie d’Amour Uwase Rangira |
| 4th Runner-up | Northern Province - Sharifa Umuhoza |

=== Special awards ===
- Miss Congeniality - Ariane Uwimana (Eastern Province)
- Miss Photogenic - Peace Ndaruhutse Kwizera (Kigali)
- Miss Popular - Sharifa Umuhoza (Northern Province)
- Miss Heritage - Jane Mutoni (Kigali)

== Contestants ==
| Province represented | Name | Age | Height (cm) |
|---|---|---|---|
| Northern Province | Sheillah Mujyambere | 20 | 175 |
| Northern Province | Sharifa Umuhoza | 21 | 174 |
| Northern Province | Solange Uwamahoro | 21 | 170 |
| Western Province | Balbine Mutoni | 20 | 173 |
| Western Province | Jolly Mutesi | 19 | 175 |
| Southern Province | Cynthia Umutoniwabo | 20 | 173 |
| Southern Province | Eduige Isimbi | 18 | 170 |
| Southern Province | Doreen Karake Umuhoza | 22 | 172 |
| Kigali | Vanessa Mpogazi | 21 | 182 |
| Kigali | Jane Umutoni | 20 | 173 |
| Kigali | Peace Ndaruhutse Kwizera | 20 | 177 |
| Eastern Province | Ariane Uwimana | 20 | 175 |
| Eastern Province | Marie d'Amour Rangira Uwase | 19 | 176 |
| Eastern Province | Delyla Akili | 20 | 174 |

== Crossovers ==
Contestants who previously competed at other national beauty pageants:

Miss Rwanda

- 2014 : Kigali: Vanessa Mpogazi
- 2015 : Kigali: Vanessa Mpogazi
- 2015 : Western Province: Balbine Umutoni (4th Runner-up)

Miss Elegancy Rwanda

- 2016 : Southern Province: Doreen Karake Umuhoza (2nd Runner-up)
- 2016 : Eastern Province: Marie d'Amour Rangira Uwase (1st Runner-up)

Miss High School

- 2014 : Western Province: Balbine Umutoni (Winner)

Contestants who previously competed or will be competing at international beauty pageants:

Miss World

- 2016: Western Province: Jolly Mutesi

Miss Heritage Global

- 2016: Kigali: Jane Mutoni (1st Runner-up)

Miss Naiades

- 2016: Kigali: Peace Ndaruhutse Kwizera (Winner)
