= Gatare, Rwanda =

Town in Nyamagabe, Rwanda

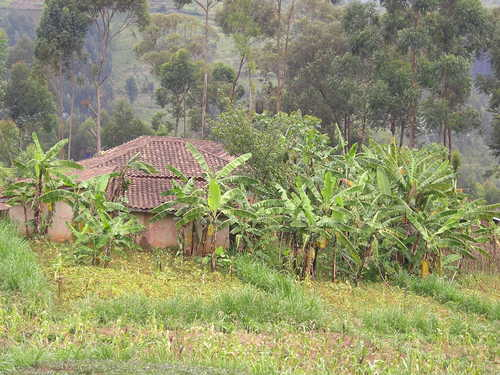
Typical rural house of Gatare region

Gatare is a town in Rwanda, Central Africa, capital of the homonymous sector in the district of Nyamagabe (former Gikongoro). The location is 2°22′04.08″S 29°22′52.15″E. It is located in the southern province of the country, around 2500 m. altitude on the mountains bordering the equatorial forest of Nyungwe. The territory is mostly covered by forest and is intensively cultivated by the population. The climate is equatorial, with heavy and abundant rains from February to April and during the period between September and November, while the period between June and August, the most critical for the population, is characterized by drought.

== Description ==
From Kigali, the capital of Rwanda, to reach Gatare, it takes about 4 to 6 hours' drive, of which 2 to 4 is on a very difficult road. The population of Gatare is large (about 20,000 inhabitants) and consists mostly of ethnic Hutu, in small part by people of Tutsi ethnicity, and in minority by pygmies (Twa). The social composition is strongly influenced by the dramatic situations due to the civil war of 1994. Part of the population has migrated from other areas, part consists of resettled refugees, coming from different areas.

The houses are scattered on the hills or concentrated in villages or towns. The households are on average six people. Authorities are trying to create conditions favoring the establishment of social mechanisms of association.

== Culture ==
Most of the population lives on agriculture and farming. The crops most suited to the area are potatoes, peas, cabbage, wheat and tea. The Rwandan government is favoring the growth of tea plantations with the construction of nurseries for small plants and the construction of processing centers of the crop. The land is not fertile and it is always necessary to use additives to fertilize.

Very little part of the population benefits of a monthly salary, often wholly inadequate and poverty is widespread.

== Infrastructure ==
Extremely low is the presence of infrastructure. Just one road links the region with the city of Nyamagabe (former Gikongoro) that is only paved for a stretch (requiring the use of off-road cars) and sometimes prohibitive, especially after the heavy equatorial rains.

== Schooling ==
In the region there is the opportunity to attend pre-school, primary and secondary schools. A particularly significant role is played by the mission of the Daughters of Divine Zeal, who run a nursery school that houses over 400 children and a Health Center (Rugege). The mission is supported by the Italian association of voluntary Komera Rwanda, helped to perform dental care by another association, Smile Mission.
