= Kayibanda (name) =

Kayibanda is a surname. Notable people with the surname include:

- Aurore Mutesi Kayibanda (born 1993), Miss Rwanda 2012
- Grégoire Kayibanda (1924-1976), Rwanda president (1961-1973)
