= Ruhango District =

Coordinates: 2°12′S 29°46′E

- District
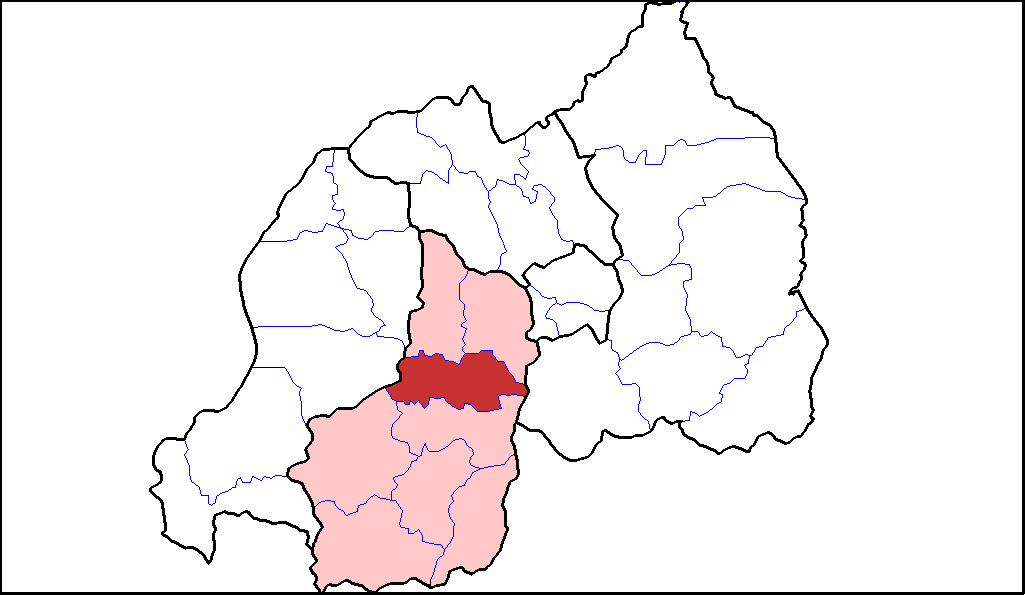
- Shown within Southern Province and Rwanda
- Country: Rwanda
- Province: Southern
- Capital: Ruhango

Area
  - District: 626.5 km^{2} (241.9 sq mi)

Population (2022 census)
  - District: 359,121
  - Density: 573.2/km^{2} (1,485/sq mi)
  - Urban: 39,079
  - Rural: 320,042

Ruhango is a district (akarere) in Southern Province, Rwanda. Its capital is Ruhango town, a large settlement on the road between Gitarama and Butare.

== Geography ==
The district lies due-north of the provincial capital Nyanza, straddling the major road from Kigali to Bujumbura. Latitude 2° 13' 24" S and Longitude 29° 46' 41" E, Latitude -2.223333 and Longitude 29.778056, Elevation: 1782m

== Health ==
According to the district monograph (administrative data), the district has 14 health centers and two hospitals including (one public and one private hospital). This is insufficient when we consider the distance covered by the population from certain Cells of district like Ntongwe and Mwendo for the health services. Some of challenges will also be insufficient of qualified staff and some health centers need to be rehabilitated, extended and equipped. The women fertility rate within Ruhango district is actually 4.1 whereas at the national level the target is 3.3

== Sectors ==
Ruhango District is one of the eight districts which compose the Southern Province. It shares the limits with Muhanga District at the north, Nyanza at the south, Bugesera at the East, Kamonyi at the north-east and Nyamagabe at the south west finally has Karongi (for Western Province) at the west.

Ruhango district has Nine (9) Sectors which are known as Kinazi Sector, Byimana, Bweramana, Mbuye, Ruhango, Mwendo, Kinihira, Ntongwe and Kabagari. From these sectors the whole district has fifty nine (59) cells and five hundred thirty three 533 villages (Imidugudu).

It covers an area of 626.8 square kilometers. Its relief, alternate seasons, vegetations give a smooth climate for its population. According to the data from NISR the population of Ruhango district is currently estimated to 304,390 from which 52.4% are women and 47.6 % are men; with 71,000 households. The actual population density is 485.62 inhabitants per square kilometer

== Agriculture ==
Ruhango district has a record in the following production: it is the highest avocado producer with an annual production of 9459t, Lemon Production 313t/yr, Sweet orange production higher than 100t/yr and Onion and Leek production 467t. From Pest Management Plan (PMP) and Arrangement for LWH 2013. It is not only in fruits but also Ruhango district has the highest concentration of crossbred cattle.

== Sources ==
- "Districts of Rwanda". Statoids.
- Inzego.doc — Province, District and Sector information from MINALOC, the Rwanda ministry of local government.
