= Nyanza, Rwanda =

Nyanza
- Town
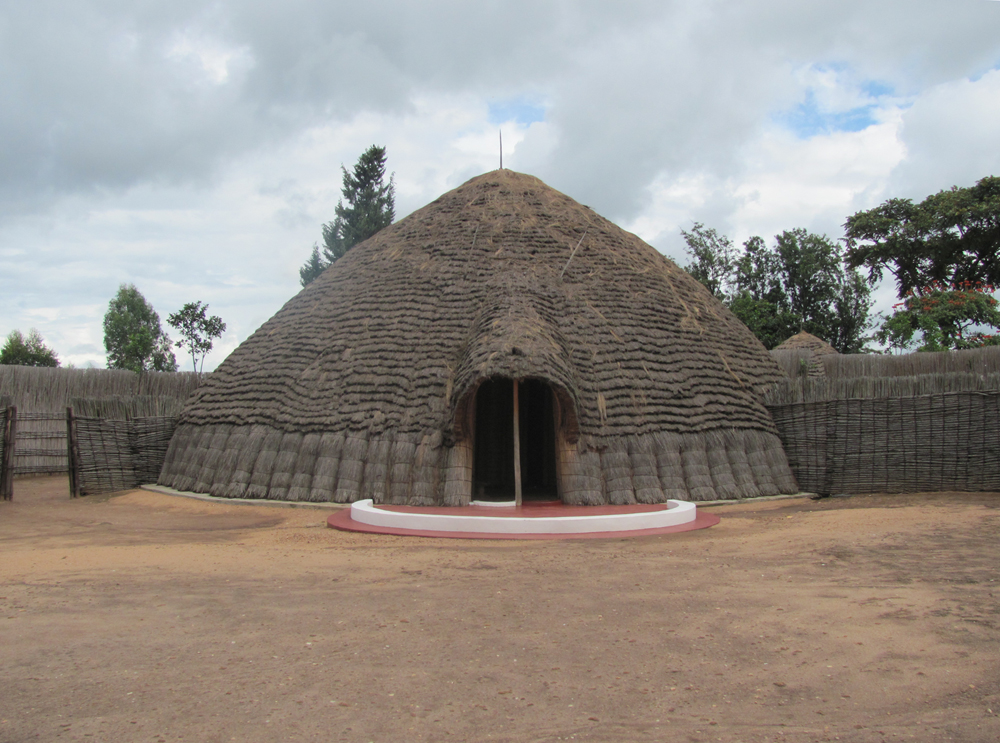
- The ancient King's Palace in Nyanza (now a museum).

- Location in Rwanda
- Coordinates: 2°21′06″S 29°45′03″E
- Country: Rwanda
- Admin. Province: Southern Province
- District: Nyanza District
- Elevation: 1,792 m (5,879 ft)

Population (2012 census)
  - Total: 25,417
- Climate: Aw

Nyanza, also known as Nyabisindu, is a town located in Nyanza District in the Southern Province of Rwanda. Nyanza is the capital of the Southern Province.

== History ==
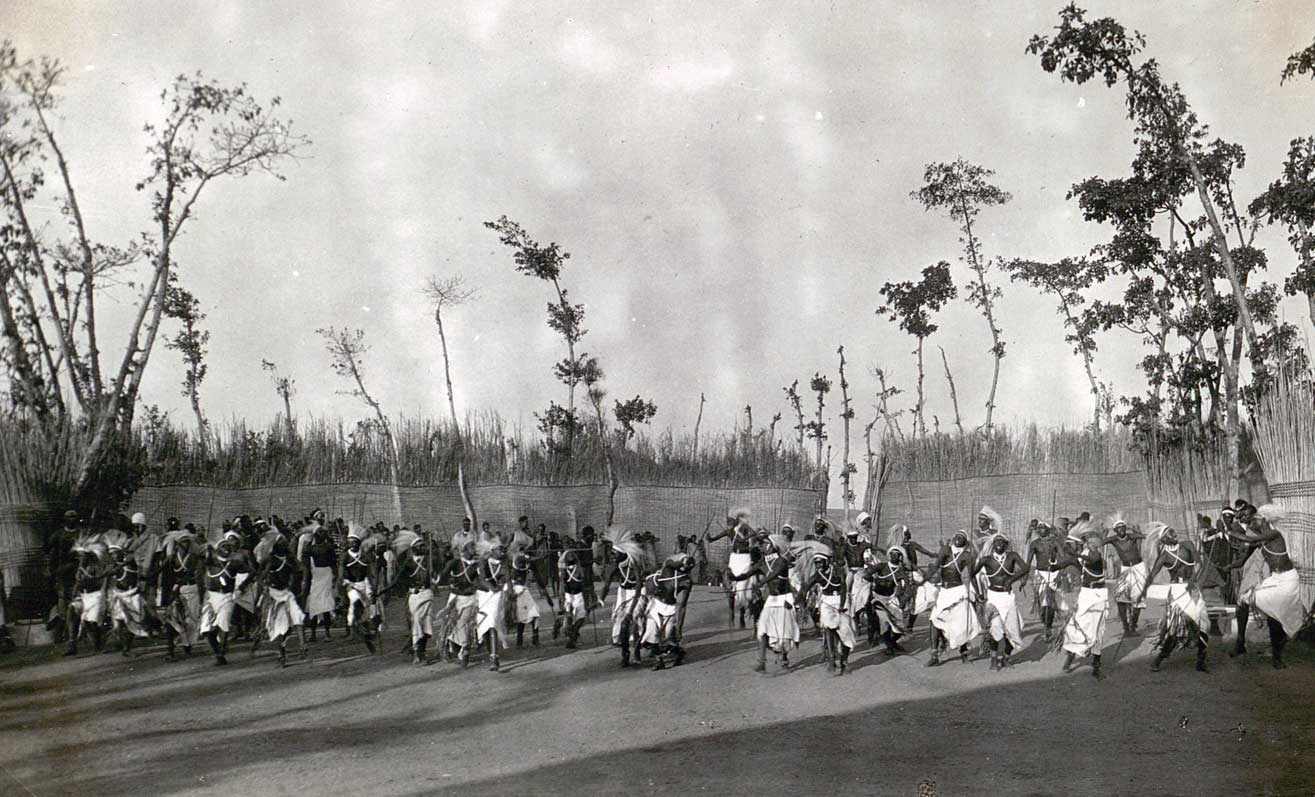
King Yuhi V Musinga's lion dancers in Nyanza (1928)

Nyanza was the capital of the Kingdom of Rwanda from 1958 to 1962.

In 1994, during the late stages of the Genocide Against Tutsi, the Rwandan Patriotic Front fought the Rwandan Armed Forces at Nyanza for several days, partially destroying the town. Many Tutsis were killed by the government forces there as part of the genocide against the Tutsi in Rwanda.

== Notable aspects ==
Nyanza is historically known for its yogurt and kefir (traditionally called ikivuguto in Ikinyarwanda, Rwanda's language). Ikivuguto, being a fermented beverage, was, and still is, popular for its healthful qualities. The town contains two dairies. Laiterie de Nyabasindu is one of Rwanda's largest milk and yogurt producing companies. Many small restaurants and shops in town sell ikivuguto by the cup or in large plastic containers to take away. Several shops in town sell bottled or packaged individual servings of ikivuguto or yogurt with added sugar or flavor, such as vanilla or strawberry.

It is also home to a large, modern, multi-story building constructed to house the United Nations International Criminal Tribunal for Rwanda (ICTR), which court continues to hear cases relating to the 1994 Genocide Against the Tutsi in Rwanda. The building does also house the High Court.

== Information for tourists ==
The town of Nyanza requires a turn off the main road that connects Kigali to Butare. Nyanza is a 2 1/2-hour bus ride from Kigali, a 1 1/2-hour bus ride to Muhanga, a one-hour bus ride to Huye, a 30-minute bus ride to Ruhango and a 16-minute bus ride to Gatagara. The bus station is in the center of Nyanza town, next to the covered outdoor market. The main bus companies serving Nyanza are Volcano and Horizon, which leave every half hour and seat about 28 passengers. There are also smaller vans known as Twegerane buses that fit in as many people as possible and depart when full. Transportation within the town is via the ubiquitous moto (motorcycle) taxis or bicycle taxis, or by foot.

The road that extends from the town center to the old, no longer used, High Court is particularly attractive, being a boulevard lined with often flowering trees and shrubs. A second road from town, (known as "the stony road" because it is made of cobble stones) leads to the Institute of Legal Practice and Development (ILPD). On that road is a restaurant serving Rwandan and Cameroonian food. From ILPD, a paved road continues and then forks at a large park, with one fork leading to the King's Palace and the other to the former art museum.

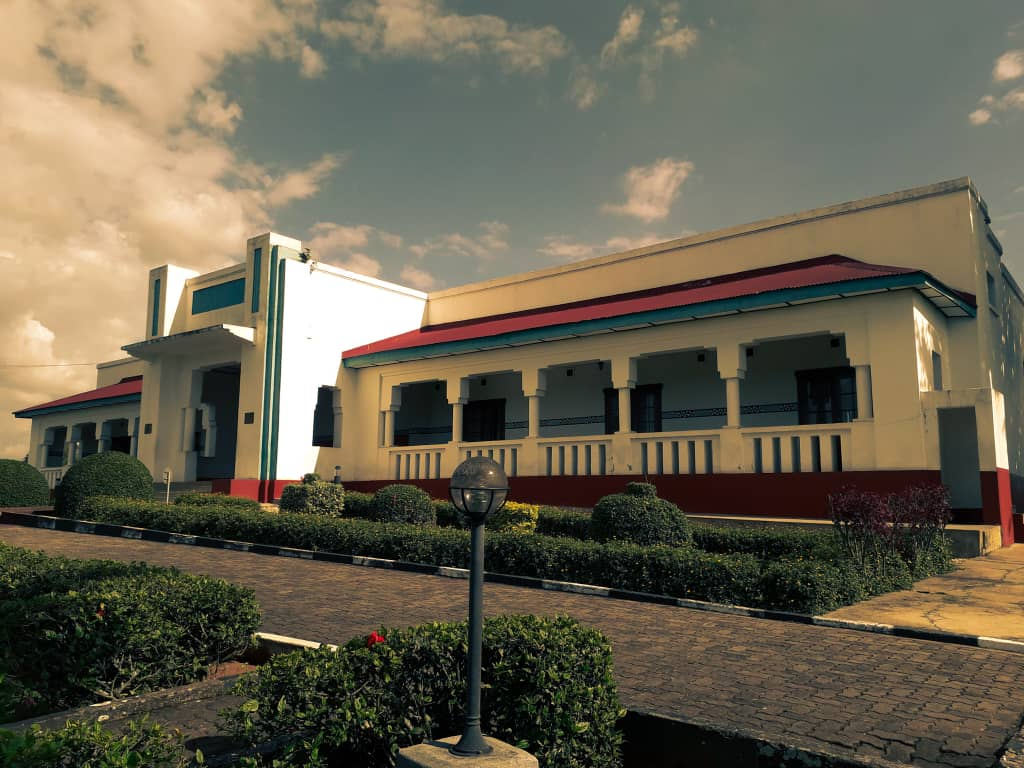
The new King's Palace built in the art deco style

The palace of the last umwami (traditional king) of Rwanda is located within walking distance of the town center and is the town's main tourist attraction. There, one can see the former king's traditional palace and contrast it to the modern palace built steps away by the Belgian colonizers for the king. While much of the king's palace remains how it was back when the king lived in it during the 1950s and 60s, some furniture was stolen or destroyed during the 1994 genocide. In some instances, replicas of original furniture have been installed. No photos are permitted inside the palace. A Rwandan woman dressed in an umushanana (Rwanda's silky, flowing traditional dress) guides visitors through the palaces.

The unusual Inyambo cattle with their heavy horns and decorations are the highlight of the tour. Visitors may pet a cow and have their photos taken with the cow while a traditional herdsman sings what sounds like a lullaby to the cow. Visitors may also try their hand at grinding sorghum, which was traditionally used to make sorghum beer. The grounds are nicely landscaped.

Another tourist attraction is the Rwesero Art Museum, which is currently in transition to another type of museum and so no longer an art museum, as the art was moved to Kigali. The view from the museum of the surrounding hills is breathtaking. Currently, the former art museum has a children's art room and many photographs of Rwandans and Rwandan life. The large building was built as a residence for the King. However, he never lived in it before he left Rwanda. The former art museum has a large parking lot and a small gift shop selling the usual Rwandan crafts, tee shirts, etc., as well as some toys and stuffed animals.

On the road to the former art museum on the left hand side is the large, multi-storied Nyanza District Office Building, overlooking the large park. The immigration office is located in this building.

Nyanza has two banks: The Bank of Kigali located in a high rise building, on the road into town, and the Banque Populaire du Rwanda (BPR) located on the road from Nyanza town to King's Palace and across from the Heritage Hotel. Both banks have ATMs. Nyanza has a hospital, a few clinics and several pharmacies. Its outdoor market has a fruit and vegetable section, a large section of beans and a section where vendors sell live chickens and rabbits. There are also sections for hardware, fabric, shoe repair, tailors, second hand clothing, shoes, cell phone and watch repair, kitchenware, bedding, farming implements, flour, sugar and oil. There is also an area where the tailors and seamstresses work at their sewing machines. Vendors also sell backpacks and personal care items. On the streets around the market are several small office supply stores and stores selling food, gifts, cell phones and sundries. On the streets seated under brightly colored umbrellas are the many sellers of cell phone air time (MTN, TIGO or Airtel).

Nyanza town has at least two institutions of higher education: the University of Lay Adventists of Kigali (UNILAK), on the road into Nyanza, and the Institute of Legal Practice and Development (ILPD), located on the road to the King's Palace at the intersection of the Avenue des Sports. ILPD hosts a six-month residential post-graduate diploma course, offering practical legal education for law school graduates. It also hosts short (usually one week or less) residential continuing education classes in law or law-related subjects for judges, lawyers, bailiffs and others. Students at ILPD come from many countries, including Rwanda, Uganda, Ghana, The Gambia, Cameroon, South Sudan and Kenya.

Nyanza town has a large stadium, located just past ILPD. There, football (soccer) matches are held. ILPD uses the stadium for its graduations. Also, the annual Umuganura (Rwandan public holiday celebrating the harvest and giving thanks. Rwanda claims that it has been celebrated for 1,800 years) festivities take place at the stadium. The celebrations for National Heroes Day on February 1 also take place there. The road and parking lot in front of the stadium are frequently used for driving school practice or for driving examinations. Beyond the stadium is Nyanza's cemetery, where Christians, Muslims and others are buried.

Nyanza has many churches, including Catholic, Seventh Day Adventist, ADEPR (Pentecostal) and others, as well as a number of mosques.

On the last Saturday of every month, the citizens of Nyanza participate in Rwanda's community service work projects called Umuganda, which may be road widening, picking up litter, weeding, terracing or building a house for a needy person. During Umuganda, all shops are closed.
