= Youth Literacy Organisation =

Education and learning non-profit

Youth Literacy Organisation (YouLI) is a non-profit NGO registered in the Republic of Rwanda, founded by Gilbert Rwabigwi in 2009. Its mission is to foster literacy and learning as a lifelong process.

YouLI runs workshops and builds platforms that inspire people to be more literate and make lifelong learning a serious goal.
