= Miss Rwanda 2009 =

- Date: December 19, 2009
- Presenters: Mich Ronnie Egwang and Anita Muneza
- Entertainment: Gikondo Expo Grounds, Kigali
- Entrants: 13
- Winner: Grace Bahati; Southern Province
- Congeniality: Winnie Uwanyuze; Eastern Province
- Photogenic: Grace Bahati; Southern Province

Miss Rwanda 2009, the 2nd edition of the Miss Rwanda pageant, was held on December 19, 2009 at Gikondo Expo Grounds in Kigali.

The winner, Grace Bahati succeeded Dalila Uwera, Miss Rwanda 1993.

== Results ==
Final Results	Contestant
Miss Rwanda 2009	Southern Province - Grace Bahati
1st Runner-up	Southern Province - Carine Utamuliza Rusaro
2nd Runner-up	Kigali - Winnie Ngamije

=== Special awards ===
- Miss Congeniality - Winnie Uwanyuze (Eastern Province)
- Miss Photogenic - Grace Bahati (Southern Province)
- Miss Popular - Winnie Ngamije (Kigali)

== Preparation ==
The 13 contestants were selected from their respective provinces to compete in the national competition. Various activities were organized to prepare candidates for the final. The first training camp was held at Lake Kivu Serena Hotel in Rubavu and later, in Nyarutarama. The training was based on the culture, economy and history of Rwanda.

== Contestants ==
Name	Age	Province represented
Michele Iradukunda	20	Western Province
Winnie Uwanyuze	24	Eastern Province
Carine Rusaro Utamuliza	22	Southern Province
Winnie Ngamije	22	Kigali
Ritah Uwera	20	Kigali
Vanessa Liliane Umuhoza	18	Southern Province
Géraldine Umutoni Karanganwa	23	Eastern Province
Peace Umugwaneza	24	Northern Province
Fiona Ruboneka	24	Kigali
Grace Bahati	18	Southern Province
Alice Kayumba Uwambaye	19	Kigali
Annuarite Uwera	24	Northern Province
Cynthia Rupari	23	Southern Province

== Judges ==
The Miss Rwanda 2009 final judges were:

- Sonia Rolland Uwitonze - Actress and director. Miss Burgundy 1999 and Miss France 2000.
- Kat Cole - Businesswoman, Group President of Focus Brands and Chief Operations Officer of Cinnabon
- Kije Mugisha-Rwamasirabo - Director of Rwanda Television from 2008 to 2011.
- Christine Tuyisenge - Executive Secretary of the National Women Council (NWC)
- Manzi Kayihura - Director general of Rwandair Express.

== Crossovers ==
Contestants who previously competed or will be competing at international beauty pageants:

Miss FESPAM

- 2007: Southern Province: Carine Utamuliza Rusaro (1st Runner-up)

Miss Tourism Queen International

- 2008: Southern Province: Carine Utamuliza Rusaro (Top 10)

Miss Naiades

- 2011: Southern Province: Carine Utamuliza Rusaro (Winner)

Miss East Africa

- 2011: Kigali: Fiona Ruboneka
  - France's representative

Miss Tourism of the Millennium

- 2012: Southern Province: Carine Utamuliza Rusaro
