= Jolly Mutesi =

Rwandan beauty pageant title holder (born 1996)

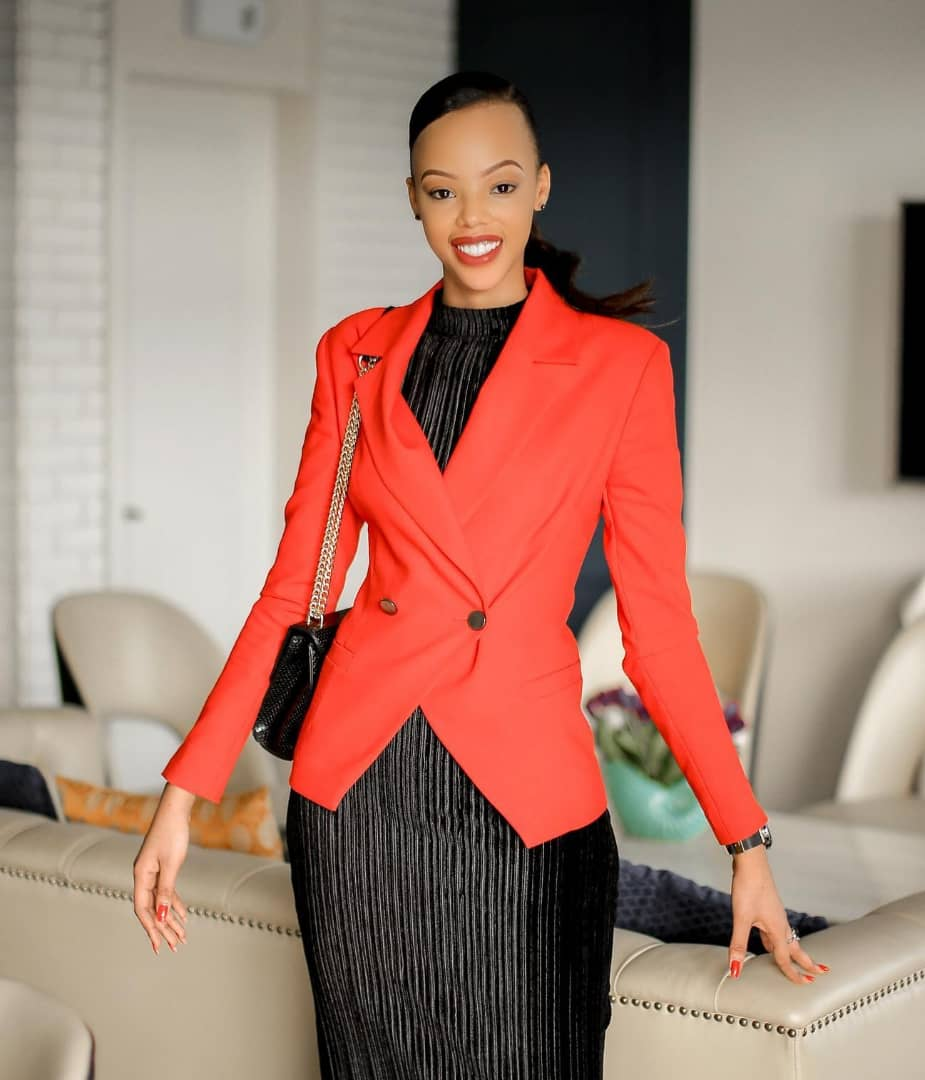
- Born: November 15, 1996 (age 29); Kasese, Uganda
- Citizenship: Rwandan
- Occupation: Model entrepreneur
- Awards: Best Motivational Speaker of The Year at Zikomo Awards

Jolly Mutesi is a Rwandan model, a beauty pageant titleholder who was crowned Miss Rwanda 2016, an entrepreneur, a girl child rights activist, and an advocate for women empowerment.

== Biography ==
At age 20, Mutesi was crowned Miss Rwanda 2016. The runners-up were Peace Ndaruhutse Kwizera and Vanessa Mpogazi.

Mutesi became the first beauty queen to represent Rwanda in the 2016 Miss World beauty competition at the MGM National Harbor, Oxon Hill, Maryland, United States.

After fulfilling her reign as Miss Rwanda, Mutesi became a motivational speaker and entrepreneur.

In 2022, Mutesi fell victim to a scam by convicted murderer and rapist Thabo Bester, who offered her a fictitious job in South Africa. After liaising with the Rwandan Ministry of Youth and Rwanda's High Commission in South Africa, Mutesi was informed the job opportunity was a scheme and was able to avoid the fraudulent setup.

== Awards ==
- Mutesi won Best Motivational Speaker of The Year at Zikomo Awards in Lusaka, Zambia.
