= Miss Rwanda =

Beauty pageant

Miss Rwanda Organization
- Formation: 1992
- Type: Beauty pageant
- Headquarters: Kigali
- Location: Rwanda
- Members: Miss World; Miss Supranational
- Official language: English; Kinyarwanda
- Key people: Dieudonne Ishimwe
- Website: www.missrwanda.rw

Miss Rwanda is a national beauty pageant in Rwanda.

In May 2022, it was reported that the pageant was suspended due to the arrest of Dieudone Ishimwe popularly known as Prince Kid, the CEO of Rwanda Inspiration Backup — the organizer of Miss Rwanda, by the Rwanda Investigation Bureau (RIB) for alleged sexual exploitation of contestants.

== History ==
Miss Rwanda was organised by telecom company Rwandatel in 2009 . The 1st edition Miss Rwanda 2009 was held on December 19, 2009 and Grace Bahati was made a history to become Miss Rwanda.

== Titleholders ==
- : Declared as Winner
- : Ended as runner-up or top 5/6 qualification
- : Ended as one of the finalists or semifinalists
- : Ended as special awards winner

The Miss Rwanda organization decided to send the winner to Miss World pageant. Meanwhile the Miss Supranational Rwanda set in different organization. The winner goes to Miss Supranational pageant.

Year	Miss Rwanda	Province	International competition		
Year	Miss Rwanda	Province	International Pageant	Placement	Special Award(s)
1992	Jeanne Munyankindi	Kigali	―	―	―
1993	Dalila Uwera	Rwandan communities in Belgium	―	―	―
2009	Grace Bahati	Southern Province	―	―	―
2012	Aurore Mutesi Kayibanda	Southern Province	Miss Supranational 2013	Unplaced	―
2012	Aurore Mutesi Kayibanda	Southern Province	Miss World 2015	Did not compete	
2014	Colombe Akiwacu	Eastern Province	―	―	―
2015	Doriane Kundwa	Northern Province	Miss Grand International 2015	Did not compete	
2016	Jolly Mutesi	Kigali	Miss World 2016	Unplaced	―
2017	Elsa Iradukunda	Northern Province	Miss World 2017	Unplaced	Top 5 Dances of the World
2018	Lilliane Iradukunda	Western Province	Miss World 2018	Unplaced	Top 25 Beauty With A Purpose
2019	Meghan Nimwiza	Kigali	Miss World 2019	Unplaced	―
2020	Naomie Nishimwe	Kigali	Due to the impact of COVID-19 pandemic, no international pageant in 2020		
2021	Grace Ingabire	Kigali	Miss World 2021	Unplaced	―
2022	Divine Nshuti Muheto	Western Province	Miss World 2023	Withdrew	

== Other International Competitions ==
Year	Representative	Original national title	International competition		
Year	Representative	Original national title	International Pageant	Placement	Special Award(s)
2011	Yvonne Uwamahoro	—N/a	Miss Supranational 2011	Unplaced	―
2012	Sabrina Kubwimana	—N/a	Miss Supranational 2012	Unplaced	―
2014	Neema Umwari Magambo	—N/a	Miss Supranational 2014	Unplaced	―
2015	Sonia Gisa	—N/a	Miss Supranational 2015	Top 20	Miss Supranational Africa
2016	Colombe Akiwacu	—N/a	Miss Supranational 2016	Top 25	―
2016	Sonia Gisa	—N/a	Miss Grand International 2016	Unplaced	―
2017	Habiba Ingabire	—N/a	Miss Supranational 2017	Unplaced	―
2018	Tina Uwase Ngaceng	—N/a	Miss Supranational 2018	Unplaced	
2019	Umunyana Shanitah	—N/a	Miss Supranational 2019	Unplaced	―
2021	Anitha Kate Umuratwa	Miss Rwanda 2021 Finalist	Miss Supranational 2021	Unplaced	Top 11 - Miss Elegance
Did not compete between 2022 - 2024
2025	Kimana Emelique	Appointed	Miss Supranational 2025	Did not compete	
