= Gilbert Rwabigwi =

Rwandan social innovator

Gilbert Rwabigwi is a Rwandan social innovator and writer who specialises in literacy, strategy, writing and progress. He is the founder of Youth Literacy Organisation (YouLI), a non-profit NGO whose mission is to foster literacy and learning as a lifelong process.

Rwabigwi the founding editor of The Kigalian, an online magazine for independent-minded writers and storytellers. He is also in Ejo Group, a social enterprise that specialises in media and content marketing.

== Writing and influence ==
Rwabigwi publishes articles regularly on The Kigalian, an independent-minded sources of ideas, stories, and profiles by writers looking to the future in Rwanda. He is also among top Rwandan influencers on Twitter and speaks at several events on issues about education, literacy, social media and culture. In 2016, Rwabigwi joined the panel of judges in Miss Rwanda as a judge at the grand finale. He announced his departure a few days ahead of the first auditions of Miss Rwanda 2019.

== Birth and Parents ==
Gilbert was born in Kigali. His father, Fulgence Bukaka, and mother, Alphonsine Mukahigiro, were killed during the Rwandan genocide in 1994.

== Education and Activism ==
Rwabigwi was raised in Kigali, with his brothers and sisters; went to Camp Kigali Primary School and Ecole Primaire l'Horizon for his primary education. He went to Groupe Scolaire Officiel de Butare (GSOB), then Groupe Scolaire Kigombe (GSK) for his secondary education. Gilbert studied at the School of Journalism and Communication, National University of Rwanda (NUR).

Rwabigwi is a respected advocate for writing and publishing in Rwanda. He is the author of "Yesterday, Today and Tomorrow: A Collection of Poems on Genocide", first published in 2008. In 2011, he was featured on the top of a list of top 10 most important Rwandan artists to know.
