= Nyanza District =

Coordinates: 2°30′S 29°30′E

- District
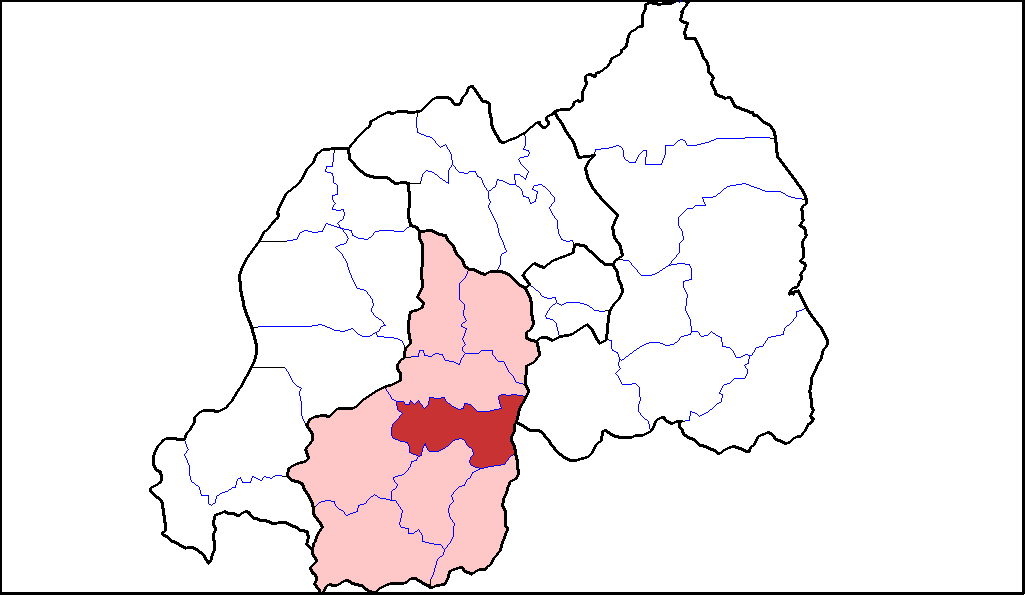
- Shown within Southern Province and Rwanda
- Country: Rwanda
- Province: Southern
- Capital: Nyanza

Area
  - District: 672.3 km^{2} (259.6 sq mi)

Population (2022 census)
  - District: 365,718
  - Density: 544.0/km^{2} (1,409/sq mi)
  - Urban: 33,765
  - Rural: 331,953

Nyanza is a district (akarere) in Southern Province, Republic of Rwanda. Its capital is Nyanza town, which is also the provincial capital. Nyanza is a Bantu word meaning lake, which probably refers to the small body of water created by a dam to the west of Nyanza town and sometimes referred to by the local residents as “Ikiyaga” or lake. which probably refers to a large lake to the west of Nyanza city.

== Geography ==
The district lies between Ruhango and Huye straddling the main Kigali to Bujumbura road. The town of Nyanza requires a turn off the main road and is also near to Bugesera.

== Nyanza's economy ==
Nyanza covers a total surface area of 672 Sq Kilometres and has a population of more than 320,000 people (according to the 2012 national Census). The bulk of Nyanza's economy is agriculture based. According to the District Development Plan 2013-2018 and Rwanda's medium term economic development strategy document –the EDPRS II, the district looks up to its young private sector to fuel its ambitious transformation agenda.

== Transport ==
It is a 2 1/2-hour bus ride to Kigali, a 1 1/2-hour bus ride to Muhanga, a one-hour bus ride to Huye, a 30-minute bus ride to Ruhango and a 16-minute bus ride to Gatagara. The bus station is in the center of Nyanza town, next to the outdoor but covered market. The main bus companies serving Nyanza are Volcano or Horizon, which leave every half hour and seat about 28 passengers. There are also smaller vans known as Twegerane buses that fit in as many people as possible and depart when full.

== Nyanza Umwami Palace ==
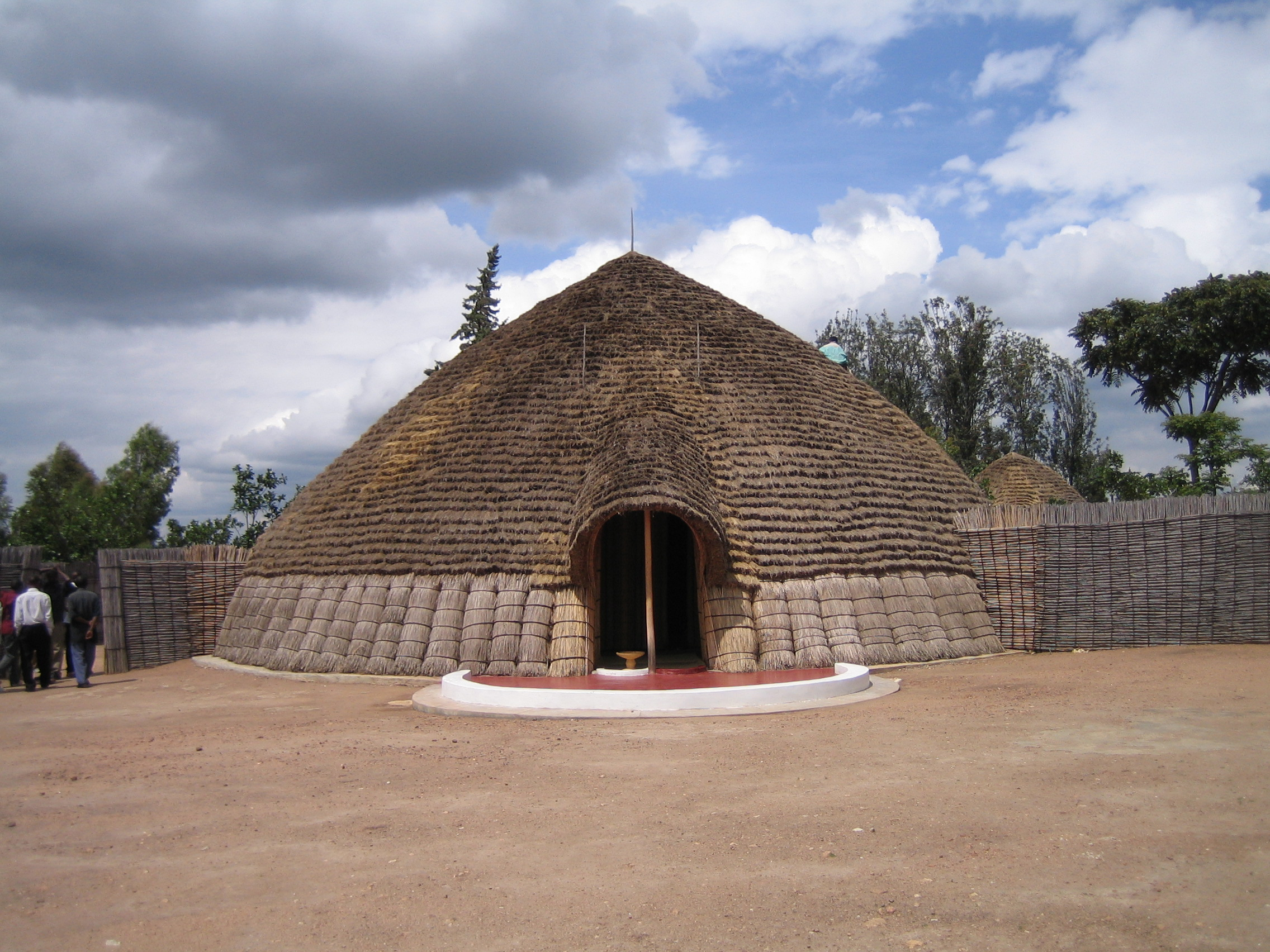
Rwanda Nyanza Mwami Palace

The palace of the last umwami (traditional king) of Rwanda (King Mutara III Rudahigwa, who reigned from 1931 to 1959) is located within walking distance of the town center and is the town's main tourist attraction. There, one can see the king's traditional palace living arrangements and the modern palace built by the Belgians for the king. A Rwandan woman dressed in an umushanana (Rwanda's silky, flowing traditional dress) guides visitors through the palaces. The highlight of the tour is the unusual Inyambo cattle, known for their enormous heavy horns. Traditionally, the cows were prized by the royal rulers. Visitors may touch a cow and have their photos taken with the cow while a traditional herdsman sings to the cow. The grounds are nicely landscaped. There is a large covered outdoor restaurant and coffee shop overlooking the gardens in front of the modern palace of the king.

On the road to the King's Palace, one passes Nyanza town's two dairies: Nyanza Milk Industry and Zirakamwa Meza Dairy. They produce milk and yogurt.

== Art Museum ==
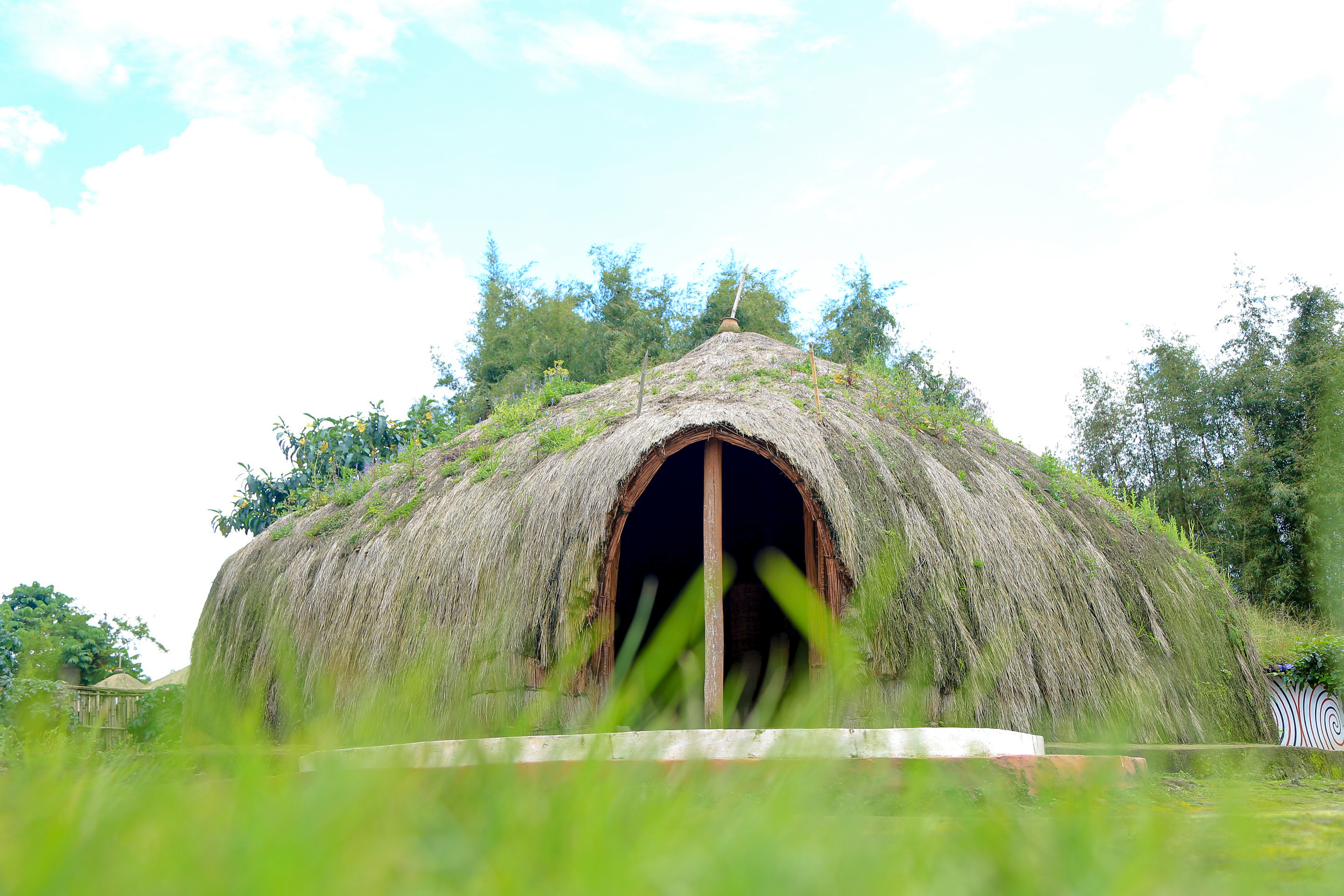
Ubusitani

Art Museum is another tourist attraction is the former, which is currently in transition to another type of museum. The view from the museum of the surrounding hills is breathtaking. Currently, that museum has a children's art room and many photographs of Rwandans and Rwandan life. The large building was built for the King. However, he never lived in it before he left Rwanda. Both the art museum and the King's Palace have large parking lots, restrooms and small gift shops selling Rwandan crafts, tee shirts, etc.

== Commerce ==
Nyanza has two banks: The Bank of Kigali, on the road into town, and the Banque Populaire du Rwanda (BPR) located in town on the road from Nyanza town to King's Palace and across from the Heritage Hotel. Both banks have ATMs. Nyanza has a hospital, a few clinics and several pharmacies. Its outdoor market has a fruit and vegetable section, a large section of beans and a section where vendors sell live chickens and rabbits. There are also sections for hardware, fabric, shoe repair, tailors, second hand clothing, shoes, cell phone and watch repair, kitchenware, bedding, farming implements, flour, sugar and oil. Vendors also sell backpacks, colorful cloth bags and personal care items. Many tailors and seamstresses work long hours in the market, sewing clothing. On the streets around the market are stores selling food, gifts, cell phones, office supplies and sundries.

On the last Saturday morning of every month, the citizens of Nyanza participate in Rwanda's community service work projects called Umuganda, which may be road widening, picking up litter, terracing, weeding or building a house for a needy person. During Umuganda, all shops and the market are closed.

== Education ==
In the town has at least two institutions of higher education: the University of Lay Adventists (UNILAK), on the road into Nyanza, and the Institute of Legal Practice and Development (ILPD), located on the road to the King's Palace at the intersection of the Avenue des Sports. ILPD hosts a six-month residential post-graduate diploma course, offering practical legal education. Many of its students come from other African countries. ILPD also hosts short continuing education classes in law or law-related subjects for judges, lawyers, investigators, bailiffs and others. A new addition to ILPD will be completed in 2019, doubling its size. Across from ILPD are a series of small shops, servicing the local populace as well as students from ILPD.

== Nyanza Stadium ==
Nyanza town has a large stadium, located just past ILPD. There, football (soccer) matches are held. ILPD uses the stadium for its graduations and its staff vs. students football matches. Also, festivities for Umuganura (Rwandan public holiday celebrating the harvest and giving thanks, which Rwanda claims has been celebrated for 1,800 years), National Liberation Day and National Heroes Day take place at the stadium. Beyond the stadium is Nyanza's cemetery, where both Christians and Muslims are buried.

On the road to the King's Palace is Nyanza's main Memorial in remembrance of the Genocide Against the Tutsi in 1994. In April of each year, people gather at the memorial to hear speeches, songs and poems to never forget what happened and for the future to say “never again.”

== Sectors ==
Nyanza district is divided into 10 sectors (imirenge): Busasamana, Busoro, Cyabakamyi, Kibirizi, Kigoma, Mukingo, Muyira, Ntyazo, Nyagisozi and Rwabicuma.
