= Smile Mission =

Smile Mission is an Italian Association of volunteers, whose aim is supplying dental and medical care to anyone in need of help. Its denomination in full is Associazione Smile Mission Solidarietà Odontoiatrica Internazionale - ETS- ODV. Smile Mission is seated in via Giuseppe Zorzi 7, in Verona, the city in which it was founded 29 June 2005.

== Purpose ==
The Association, strictly no-profit, pursues social solidarity, especially in the range of health services, through interventions supporting sanitary activity of prevention, care, bodily and psychical recovery towards needy people, in Italy and abroad.

Smile Mission was founded on the initiative of some members, the greater part of them performing dentistry. Nowadays the Association still operates mainly in the sphere of dentistry, though it keeps some missions going in others medical specialities, too. Among a good deal of projects active or accomplished, can be mentioned the mission in Nzihi, Tanzania, going on in accordance with local Ministry of Health, (example of an activity drawing towards an administration fully undertaken by local government); as well as the dentist's surgery boat cruising along the Madeira River, in Brazil.

== Sphere of action ==
Association's activities, carried out gratis by members, are:

- Help, prevention and sanitary education (medical and dental) to disadvantaged people;
- To organize expedition of volunteers to seat of projects' accomplishment: physicians, dentists, dental mechanics, oral hygiene's diplomaeds, assistants, etc.;
- Economic support to development programs, self-government, performed by local communities, in the range of medical and dental assistance;
- Didactic activity, dental and medical, for its own members, people benefited by projects, and local operators.

All activities are accomplished respecting social and cultural situations of the countries where the association is working, avoiding to impose forms religious, ideological, of organization, technological not shared by involved people.

== Nations in which projects are active ==
Smile Mission has in course projects in Italy; Tanzania; Democratic Republic of the Congo; Malawi; Brazil; Madagascar;. New projects are developing in Rwanda, in joint venture with another Association, Komera Rwanda, and in Burkina Faso. Former projects, now closed, operated in India, Albania, Bosnia.
