= Nyamagabe District =

Coordinates: 2°24′S 29°28′E

- District
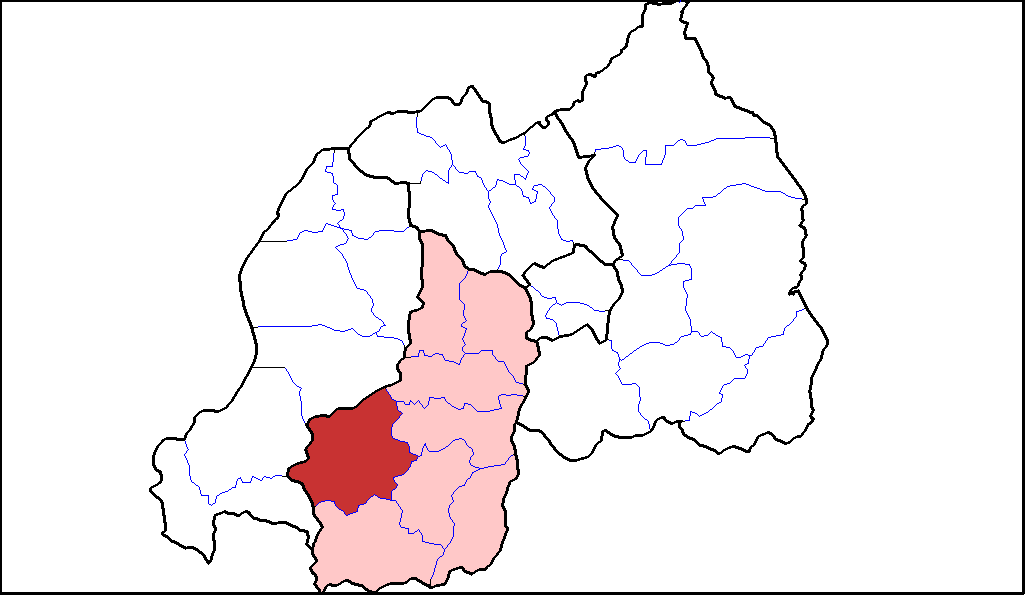
- Shown within Southern Province and Rwanda
- Country: Rwanda
- Province: Southern
- Capital: Gasaka

Area
  - District: 1,090 km^{2} (420 sq mi)

Population (2022 census)
  - District: 371,501
  - Density: 341/km^{2} (883/sq mi)
  - Urban: 40,592
  - Rural: 330,909

Nyamagabe is a district (akarere) in Southern Province, Rwanda. Its capital is Gasaka. It is a district dominated by fertile soils. A small portion of Nyungwe National Park is found in Nyamagabe, especially in Kitabi sector.

== Geography, flora and fauna ==
The district lies between Butare (Huye district) and Cyangugu in the south-west of Rwanda, and contains much of the former Gikongoro Province, which was disbanded in 2006. It also contains the eastern half of Nyungwe Forest, a popular tourist destination, being one of the last remaining forest areas of Rwanda and home to chimpanzees and many other species of primate.

== Sectors ==
Nyamagabe district is divided into 17 sectors (imirenge): Buruhukiro, Cyanika, Gatare, Kaduha, Kamegeli, Kibirizi, Kibumbwe, Kitabi, Mbazi, Mugano, Musange, Musebeya, Mushubi, Nkomane, Gasaka, Tare and Uwinkingi.

== Kigeme refugee camp ==
The Kigeme refugee camp is located in the district. A Turi Kumwe Centre, housing "a Police post as well as migration and camp management offices" was opened in the camp in 2014.
