= Aurore Mutesi Kayiranga =

Rwandan model and beauty pageant titleholder

Aurore Mutesi Kayibanda
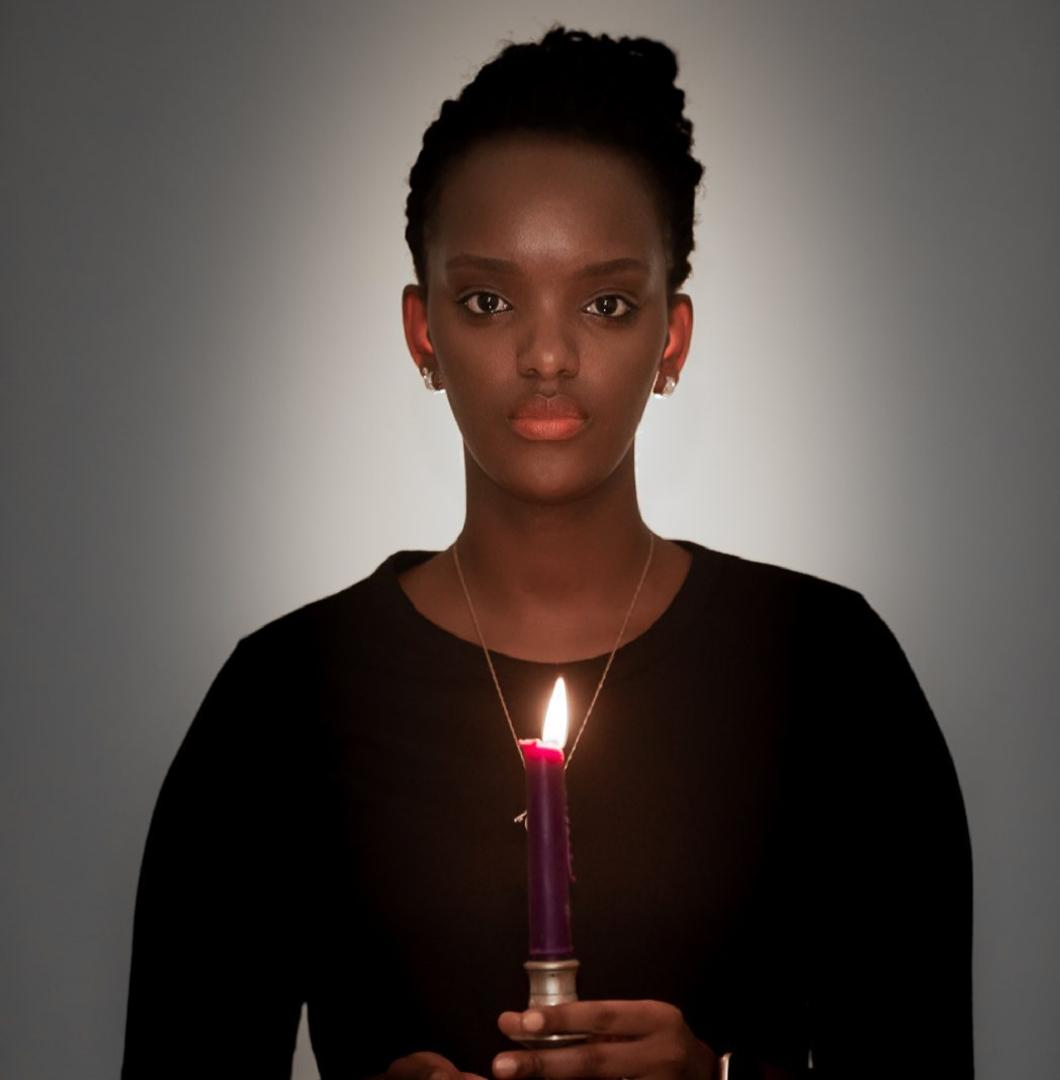
- Born: Aurore Mutesi Kayibanda; 1992 (age 33–34); Bujumbura, Burundi
- Other name: Aurore Mutesi
- Height: 1.80 m (5 ft 11 in)
- Beauty pageant titleholder
- Title: Miss Rwanda 2012
- Hair color: Black
- Eye color: Brown
- Major competitions: Miss Rwanda 2012 (winner); Miss Fespam(panafrican) 2013-2015 (winner); Miss Supranational 2013 (Unplaced); Miss World 2015 (Did not compete)

Aurore Mutesi Kayibanda (born 1993 in Bujumbura) is a Rwandan model and beauty pageant titleholder who was crowned Miss Rwanda 2012.

== Early life ==
Mutesi Kayibanda Aurore, daughter of Ladislas Kayibanda and Olive Mukazera, now living in Kigali City, was born in Burundi (Bujumbura) in 1992, the youngest of four (4) children.

Miss Mutesi Kayibanda Aurore attended nursery school at Petit Prince (in Kigali city) where she continued her primary education and later continued her education at Kimisange Primary School, where she graduated from primary school. In secondary school, studied at St Joseph's in Nyamirambo and continued at ETO Muhima, where she graduated from Construction with a Bachelor's degree in Construction. Aurore graduated from Kigali Institute Science and Technology a campus of National University of Rwanda.

Mutesi Aurore was crowned Miss Rwanda in 2012 and was crowned Miss FESPAM in the City of Brazzaville at the 2013 Panafrican de la Musique African Music Festival.

Miss Mutesi Kayibanda Aurore was 20 years old and was elected on September 1, 2012, among 14 girls from all over Rwanda. She was representing the Southern Province in the pageant. She was crowned by former Rwanda Minister of Culture, Mitali Protais. Mutesi Kayibanda Aurore was crowned with Natacha Uwamahoro and Ariane Murerwa as the first and second runners-up respectively.

== Pageantry ==
=== Miss Rwanda 2012 ===
Aurore was crowned as Miss Rwanda 2012 on September 2, 2012. Meanwhile, the runners-up were Natasha Uwamahoro and Ariane Murerwa.

=== Miss FESPAM 2013 ===
Aurore was crowned Miss Fespam Panafrica 2013 in Congo Brazzaville

=== Miss Supranational 2013 ===
Aurore represented Rwanda at Miss Supranational 2013 in Minsk, Belarus.

=== Miss World 2014 ===
Aurore was the first representative of Rwanda in Miss World.

Preceded by Grace Bahati	Miss Rwanda; 2012-2013	Succeeded by Akiwacu Colombe
