= Ruhango =

- Sector and town
- Location in Rwanda
- Coordinates: 2°13′57″S 29°46′49″E
- Country: Rwanda
- Province: Southern Province
- District: Ruhango

Area
  - Sector and town: 94.51 km^{2} (36.49 sq mi)
- Elevation: 1,686 m (5,531 ft)

Population (2022 census)
  - Sector and town: 75,618
  - Density: 800.1/km^{2} (2,072/sq mi)
  - Urban: 19,792
- Time zone: UTC+2 (CAT)
  - Summer (DST): UTC+2 (not observed)

Ruhango is a sector and town in Southern Province, Rwanda. The town is the capital of the Ruhango District.
