= Southern Province, Rwanda =

Province of Rwanda

Southern Province
- Province
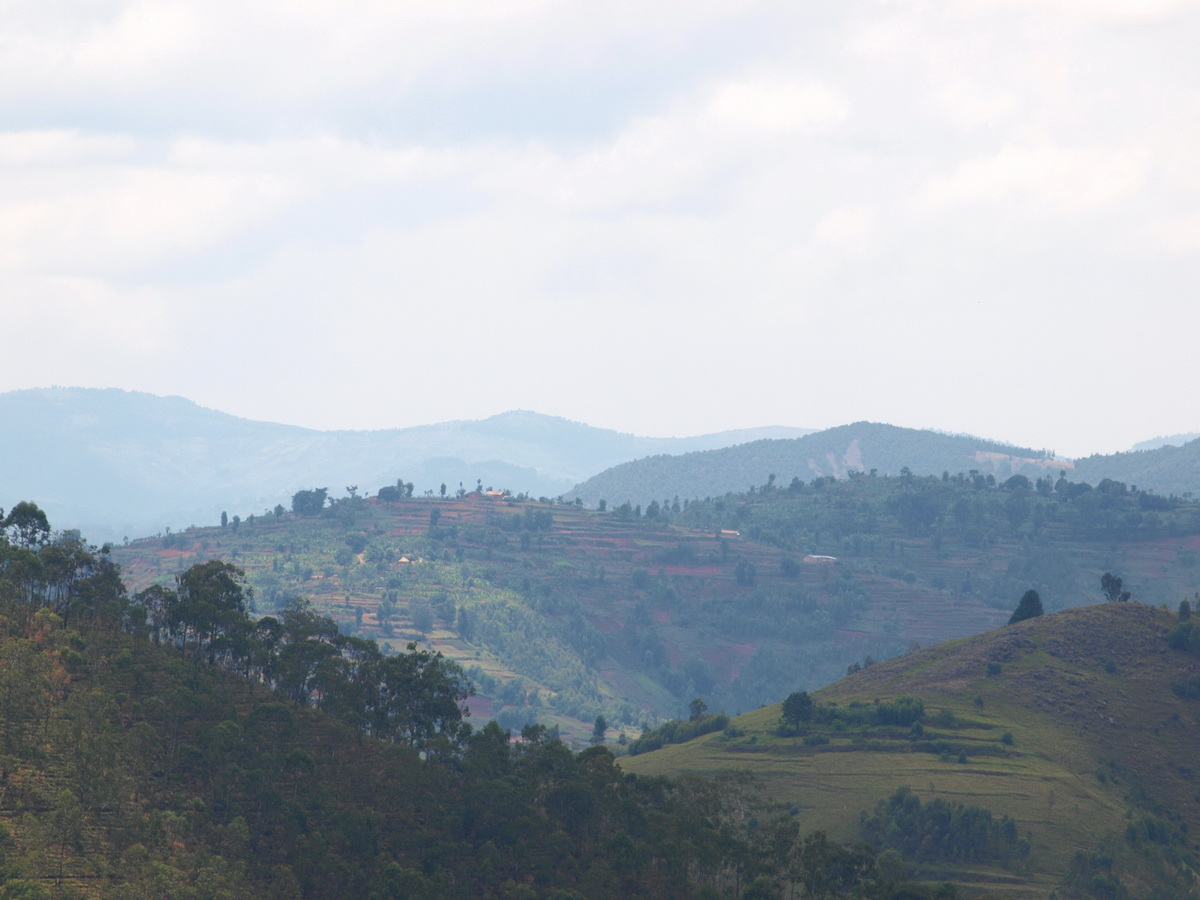
- Landscape near the Burundi border

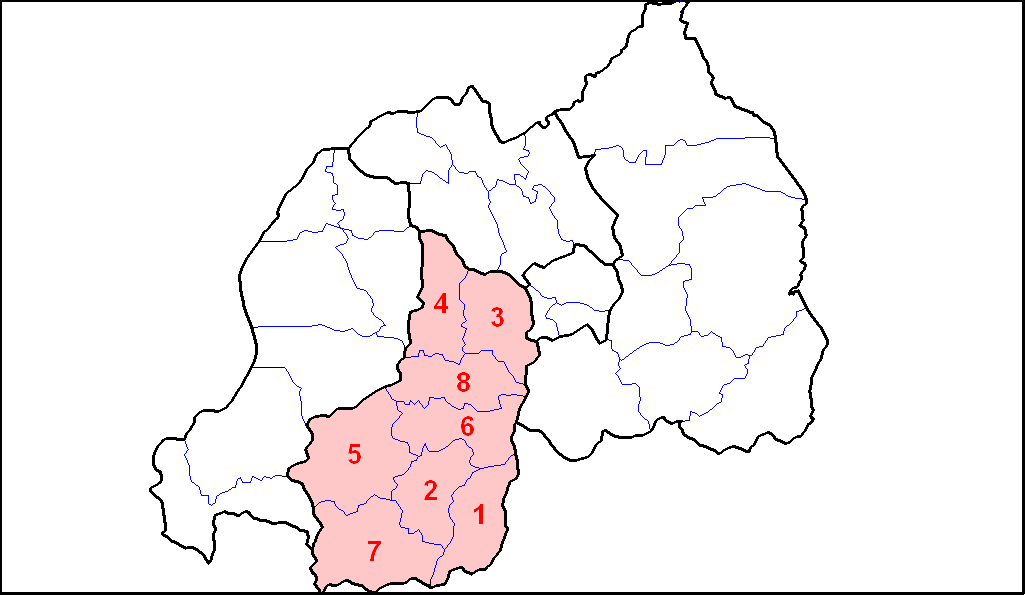
- Coordinates: 2°37′19″S 29°36′29″E
- Country: Rwanda
- Formed: 2006
- Capital: Nyanza
- Districts: List: Gisagara; Huye; Kamonyi; Muhanga; Nyamagabe; Nyanza; Nyaruguru; Ruhango

Government
  - Governor: Alice Kayitesi

Area
  - Province: 5,963 km^{2} (2,302 sq mi)

Population (2022 census)
  - Province: 3,002,699
  - Density: 503.6/km^{2} (1,304/sq mi)
  - Urban: 444,106
  - Rural: 2,558,593
- Time zone: UTC+02:00 (CAT)
- ISO 3166 code: RW-05
- Other settlements: Butare, Gikongoro, Ruhango
- HDI (2023): 0.556 medium · 4th of 5
- Website: https://www.southernprovince.gov.rw

Southern Province (Kinyarwanda: Intara y'Amajyepfo; French: Province du Sud; Dutch: Zuidelijke Provincie) is one of Rwanda's five provinces. It was created in early January 2006 as part of a government decentralization program that re-organized the country's local government structures.

Southern Province comprises the former provinces of Gikongoro, Gitarama, and Butare, and is divided into the districts of Huye, Ruhango, Nyamagabe, Gisagara, Muhanga, Kamonyi, Nyanza, and Nyaruguru.

The capital city of Southern Province is Nyanza.

== Notable people ==
- Olivier Nsengimana, veterinarian and conservationist
