= List of rivers of Rwanda =

This is a list of rivers in Rwanda. This list is arranged by drainage basin, with respective tributaries indented under each larger stream's name.

== Congo basins ==
The western third of Rwanda is mainly covered by a mountain range to the east of the Albertine Rift. Rivers drain the west side of this range into the Congo River basin via the Ruzizi River, ultimately discharging into the Atlantic Ocean. The main rivers in Rwanda that supply the Congo River basin are the Sebeya, Koko, Ruhwa, Rubyiro and Ruzizi.

- Congo River (Democratic Republic of the Congo)
  - Lualaba River (Democratic Republic of the Congo)
    - Lukuga River (Democratic Republic of the Congo)
      - Lake Tanganyika
        - Ruzizi River
          - Lake Kivu
            - Sebeya River
            - Koko River, Rutsiro District
          - Rubyiro River
          - Ruhwa River
            - Koko River, Rusizi District

== Nile Basin ==
Most of Rwanda lies to the east of the Congo-Nile Divide and drains into the Nile basin. The main rivers are Mwogo, Rukarara, Mukungwa, Base, Nyabarongo and the Akanyaru. The Nyabarongo is called the Akagera after receiving the waters of Lake Rweru.

- Nile River
  - Lake Victoria
    - Kagera River
      - Nyabarongo River / Akagera
        - Mbirurume
        - Mwogo
          - Rukarara
        - Mukungwa
        - Base
        - Akanyaru
