= Rusumo =

Rusumo may refer to:

- Rusumo, Rwanda, a town in southeastern Rwanda
- Rusumo Falls, a prominent waterfall on the Rwanda–Tanzania border, close to Rusumo, Rwanda
- Rusumo District, a former district in the former Rwandan province of Kibungo
- Rusumo, Tanzania, a settlement in Ngara District, in the Kagera Region of Tanzania
- Rusumo Bridge, a bridge across the Kagera River, linking Rwanda and Tanzania, built in 1972
- Rusumo International Bridge, a wider bridge across the River Kagera, built in 2014
- Rusumo Hydroelectric Power Station, an 80 megawatt hydro power station at the site of the Rusumo Falls.
