= List of river systems by length =

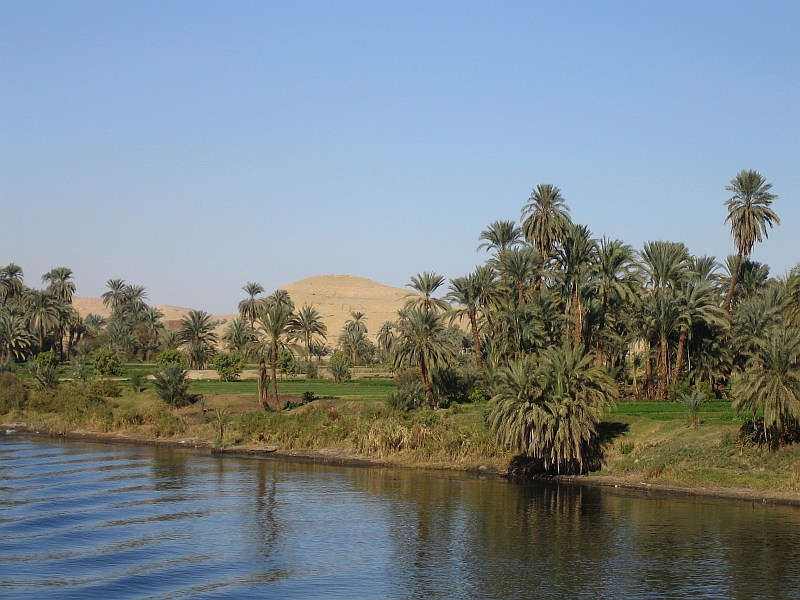
The Nile as seen from a cruise boat between Luxor and Aswan in Egypt

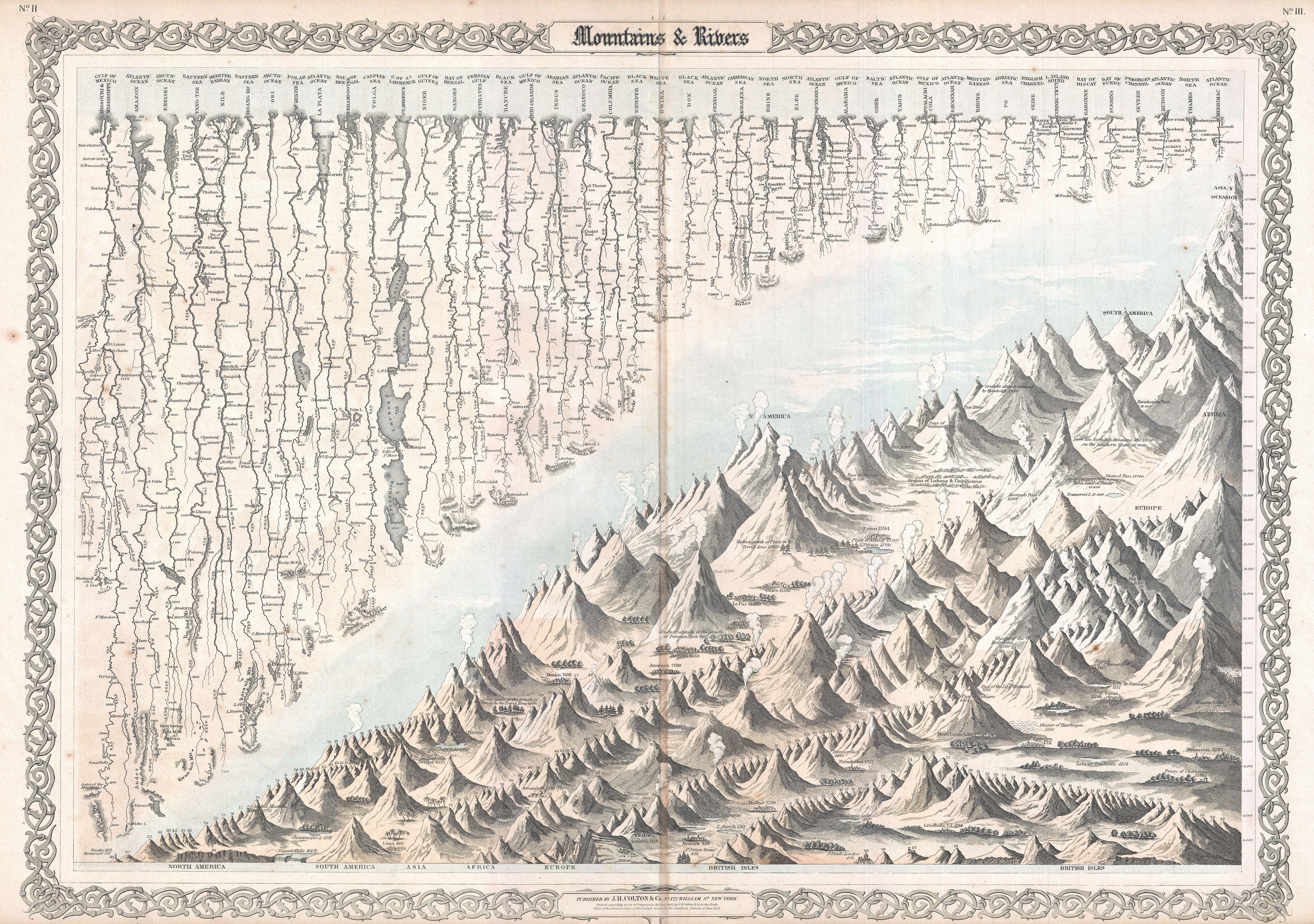
Chart of the World's Mountains and Rivers by J. H. Colton, 1855

This is a list of the longest rivers on the Earth. It includes river systems over 1,000 kilometres (620 mi) in length.

== Definition of length ==
There are many factors, such as the identification of the source, the identification or the definition of the mouth, and the scale of measurement of the river length between source and mouth, that determine the precise meaning of "river length". As a result, the length measurements of many rivers are only approximations (see also coastline paradox). In particular, there seems to exist disagreement as to whether the Nile or the Amazon is the world's longest river. The Nile has traditionally been considered longer, but in 2007 and 2008 some scientists claimed that the Amazon is longer by measuring the river plus the adjacent Pará estuary and the longest connecting tidal canal. A peer-reviewed article published 2009 in the International Journal of Digital Earth concludes that the Nile is longer.

Even when detailed maps are available, the length measurement is not always clear. A river may have multiple channels, or anabranches. The length may depend on whether the center or the edge of the river is measured. It may not be clear how to measure the length through a lake or reservoir. Seasonal and annual changes may alter both rivers and lakes. Other factors that can change the length of a river include cycles of erosion and flooding, dams, levees, and channelization. In addition, the length of meanders can change significantly over time due to natural or artificial cutoffs, when a new channel cuts across a narrow strip of land, bypassing a large river bend. For example, due to 18 cutoffs created between 1766 and 1885, the length of the Mississippi River from Cairo, Illinois, to New Orleans, Louisiana, was reduced by 351 kilometres (218 miles).

These points make it difficult, if not impossible, to get an accurate measurement of the length of a river. The varying accuracy and precision also makes it difficult to make length comparisons between different rivers without a degree of uncertainty. There is no strictly agreed upon standard for dealing with the nuances of measuring rivers and as such the true length of a river is not necessarily a single, discrete, correct number, nor is it static.

== List of river systems longer than 1,000 km ==
For most rivers, different sources provide conflicting information on the length of a river system. The information in different sources is between parentheses.

Legend of colors used in main table, by continent
Continent color key
Africa	Asia	Australia	Europe	North America	South America

Rank	River	Length (km)	Length (miles)	Drainage area (km^{2})	Average discharge (m^{3}/s)	Outflow	Countries in the drainage basin
1.	Nile–White Nile–Kagera–Nyabarongo–Mwogo–Rukarara (Note: The Nile is usually said to be the longest river in the world, with a length of about 6,650 km, and the Amazon the second longest, with a length of at least 6,400 km. In 2007 and 2008, some scientists claimed that the Amazon has a length of 6,992 km and was longer than the Nile, whose length was calculated as 6,853 km. They achieved this result by adding the waterway from the Amazon's southern outlet through tidal canals and the Pará estuary of the Tocantins. The dispute is: "Is the channel south of Isla de Marajó to be treated as part of the Amazon, or as part of the Rio Tocantins?" A peer-reviewed article, published in 2009, states a length of 7,088 km for the Nile and 6,575 km for the Amazon, measured by using a combination of satellite image analysis and field investigations to the source regions. According to the Encyclopædia Britannica, as of 2020, the length of the Amazon remains open to interpretation and continued debate. Note that disputed values have been put in parentheses.)	6,650 (7,088)	4,130 (4,404)	3,254,555	2,490	Mediterranean	Ethiopia, Eritrea, Sudan, Uganda, Tanzania, Kenya, Rwanda, Burundi, Egypt, Democratic Republic of the Congo, South Sudan
2.	Amazon–Ucayali–Tambo–Ene–Mantaro	6,400 (6,575)	3,976 (4,086)	7,000,000	230,000	Atlantic Ocean	Brazil, Peru, Colombia
3.	Yangtze–Jinsha–Tongtian–Dangqu (Chang Jiang)	6,300 (6,418)	3,917 (3,988)	1,970,000	31,900	East China Sea	China
4.	Mississippi–Missouri–Jefferson–Beaverhead–Red Rock–Hell Roaring	6,275	3,902	3,248,000	21,300	Gulf of Mexico	United States (98.5%), Canada (1.5%)
5.	Yenisey–Angara–Selenga–Ider	5,539	3,445	2,580,000	20,200	Kara Sea	Russia (97%), Mongolia (2.9%)
6.	Yellow River (Huang He)	5,464	3,395	752,546	2,571	Bohai Sea	China
7.	Ob–Irtysh	5,410	3,364	2,990,000	13,100	Gulf of Ob	Russia, Kazakhstan, China, Mongolia
8.	Río de la Plata–Paraná–Rio Grande	4,880	3,030	3,182,064	27,225	Río de la Plata	Brazil (46.7%), Argentina (27.7%), Paraguay (13.5%), Bolivia (8.3%), Uruguay (3.8%)
9.	Congo–Lualaba-Luvua-Luapula-Chambeshi (Zaïre)	4,700	2,922	3,680,000	41,400	Atlantic Ocean	Democratic Republic of the Congo, Central African Republic, Angola, Republic of the Congo, Tanzania, Cameroon, Zambia, Burundi, Rwanda
10.	Amur–Argun (Heilong Jiang)	4,444	2,763	1,855,000	12,360	Sea of Okhotsk	Russia, China, Mongolia
11.	Lena	4,400	2,736	2,490,000	18,300	Laptev Sea	Russia
12.	Mekong (Lancang Jiang)	4,350	2,705	810,000	16,010	South China Sea	China, Myanmar, Laos, Thailand, Cambodia, Vietnam
13.	Mackenzie–Slave–Peace–Finlay	4,241	2,637	1,805,200	9,800	Beaufort Sea	Canada
14.	Niger	4,200	2,611	2,117,700	8,570	Gulf of Guinea	Nigeria (26.6%), Mali (25.6%), Niger (23.6%), Algeria (7.6%), Guinea (4.5%), Cameroon (4.2%), Burkina Faso (3.9%), Côte d'Ivoire, Benin, Chad
15.	Brahmaputra–Yarlung Tsangpo	3,969	2,466	712,035	27,000	Ganges	India (58.0%), China (28.8%), Bangladesh (6.6%), Disputed India/China (4.2%), Bhutan (2.4%)
16.	Murray–Darling–Culgoa–Balonne–Condamine	3,672	2,282	1,061,000	767	Southern Ocean	Australia
17.	Tocantins–Araguaia	3,650	2,270	950,000	17,600	Atlantic Ocean (Marajó Bay), Amazon Delta	Brazil
18.	Volga	3,645	2,266	1,380,000	8,380	Caspian Sea	Russia
19.	Shatt al-Arab–Euphrates–Murat	3,596	2,236	938,173	3,350	Persian Gulf	Iraq, Turkey, Syria, Iran
20.	Madeira–Mamoré–Grande–Caine–Rocha	3,380	2,100	1,485,200	31,200	Amazon	Brazil, Bolivia, Peru
21.	Purús	3,211	1,995	376,600	11,207	Amazon	Brazil, Peru
22.	Yukon	3,185	1,980	854,700	7,000	Bering Sea	United States (59.8%), Canada (40.2%)
23.	Indus–Sênggê Zangbo	3,180	1,976	1,081,718	5,533	Arabian Sea	Pakistan (93%), India and China
24.	São Francisco	3,180* (2,900)	1,976* (1,802)	610,000	3,300	Atlantic Ocean	Brazil
25.	Syr Darya–Naryn	3,078	1,913	219,000	703	Aral Sea	Kazakhstan, Kyrgyzstan, Uzbekistan, Tajikistan
26.	Salween (Nu Jiang)	3,060	1,901	324,000	6,700	Andaman Sea	China (52.4%), Myanmar (43.9%), Thailand (3.7%)
27.	Saint Lawrence–Niagara–Detroit–Saint Clair–Saint Marys–Saint Louis–North (Great Lakes)	3,058	1,900	1,030,000	12,500	Gulf of Saint Lawrence	Canada (52.1%), United States (47.9%)
28.	Rio Grande	3,057	1,900	570,000	82	Gulf of Mexico	United States (52.1%), Mexico (47.9%)
29.	Lower Tunguska	2,989	1,857	473,000	3,600	Yenisei	Russia
30.	Colorado-Green (western U.S.)	2,945	1,830	390,000	1,200	Gulf of California	United States, Mexico
31.	Danube–Breg (Donau, Dunăre, Duna, Dunav, Dunaj)	2,888*	1,795*	801,463	6,452	Black Sea	Romania (28.9%), Hungary (11.7%), Austria (10.3%), Serbia (10.3%), Germany (7.5%), Slovakia (5.8%), Bulgaria (5.2%), Croatia (4.5%), Ukraine (3.8%), Bosnia and Herzegovina, Moldova, Montenegro, Czech Republic, Switzerland, Slovenia, Italy
32.	Irrawaddy River–N'Mai River–Dulong River–Kelaoluo–Gada Qu	2,809*	1,745.8*	404,200*	15,112	Andaman Sea	China, Myanmar
33.	Zambezi (Zambesi)	2,740*	1,703*	1,330,000	4,880	Mozambique Channel	Zambia (41.6%), Angola (18.4%), Zimbabwe (15.6%), Mozambique (11.8%), Malawi (8.0%), Tanzania (2.0%), Namibia, Botswana
34.	Vilyuy	2,720	1,700	454,000	1,480	Lena	Russia
35.	Padma-Ganges-Alaknanda (Ganga)	2,704	1,690	1,024,000	16,000	Bay of Bengal	India, Bangladesh, China, Nepal
36.	Amu Darya–Panj	2,620	1,628	534,739	1,400	Aral Sea	Uzbekistan, Turkmenistan, Tajikistan, Afghanistan
37.	Japurá (Caquetá)	2,615*	1,625*	289,000	18,122	Amazon	Brazil, Colombia
38.	Nelson–Saskatchewan–South Saskatchewan–Bow	2,570	1,597	1,111,890	3,500	Hudson Bay	Canada, United States
39.	Paraguay (Rio Paraguay)	2,549	1,584	900,000	4,300	Paraná	Brazil, Paraguay, Bolivia, Argentina
40.	Kolyma	2,513	1,562	647,000	4,100	East Siberian Sea	Russia
41.	Pilcomayo	2,500	1,553	270,000	200	Paraguay	Paraguay, Argentina, Bolivia
42.	Upper Ob–Katun	2,490	1,547	1,040,000		Ob	Russia
43.	Ishim	2,450	1,522	177,000	56	Irtysh	Kazakhstan, Russia
44.	Orange	2,432	1,511	973,000	365	Atlantic Ocean	South Africa, Namibia, Botswana, Lesotho
45.	Ural	2,428	1,509	237,000	475	Caspian Sea	Russia, Kazakhstan
46.	Juruá	2,410	1,499	190,573	6,004	Amazon	Peru, Brazil
47.	Arkansas	2,348	1,459	505,000 (435,122)	1,066	Mississippi	United States
48.	Songhua	2,309	1,435	557,180	2,410	Amur	China
49.	Olenyok	2,292	1,424	219,000	1,210	Laptev Sea	Russia
50.	Dnieper	2,287	1,421	516,300	1,670	Black Sea	Ukraine, Belarus, Russia
51.	Aldan	2,273	1,412	729,000	5,501	Lena	Russia
52.	Ubangi–Uele	2,270	1,410	651,915	5,936	Congo	Democratic Republic of the Congo, Central African Republic, Republic of Congo
53.	Negro	2,250	1,398	720,114	34,573	Amazon	Brazil, Venezuela, Colombia
53.	Columbia-Snake	2,250	1,398	671,000	7,500	Pacific Ocean	Canada (30%), United States (70%)
55.	Tapajós-Teles Pires	2,210	1,290	494,254	13,540	Amazon	Brazil
56.	Pearl–Xi-Xun-Qian-Hongshui-Nanpan	2,200	1,376	437,000	10,700	South China Sea	China (98.5%), Vietnam (1.5%)
57.	Red (USA)	2,188	1,360	78,592	875	Mississippi	United States
58.	Kasai	2,153	1,338	880,200	10,000	Congo	Angola, Democratic Republic of the Congo
59.	Ohio–Allegheny	2,102	1,306	490,603	7,957	Mississippi	United States
60.	Orinoco	2,101	1,306	1,014,797	39,000	Atlantic Ocean	Venezuela, Colombia, Guyana
61.	Tarim	2,100	1,305	1,020,000		Lop Nur	China
61.	Xingu	2,100	1,305	520,292	10,023	Amazon	Brazil
63.	Jubba–Shebelle	2,064	1,282	749,000		Indian Ocean	Ethiopia, Somalia
64.	Brazos-Double Mountain Fork-North Fork-Blackwater Draw	2,060	1,280	116,000	237.5	Gulf of Mexico	United States
65.	Northern Salado	2,010	1,249	203,000		Paraná	Argentina
66.	Içá (Putumayo)	2,005	1,246	120,545	8,520	Amazon	Brazil, Peru, Colombia, Ecuador
67.	Vitim	1,978	1,229	225,000	1,937	Lena	Russia
68.	Chenab	1,974	675	160,000	977.3	Indus	India, Pakistan
69.	Tigris	1,950	1,212	375,000	1,014	Shatt al-Arab	Turkey, Iraq, Syria, Iran
70.	Don	1,870	1,162	425,600	935	Sea of Azov	Russia, Ukraine
71.	Stony Tunguska	1,865	1,159	240,000	1,750	Yenisey	Russia
72.	Pechora	1,809	1,124	312,041	4,823	Barents Sea	Russia
73.	Kama	1,805	1,122	507,000	4,100	Volga	Russia
74.	Limpopo	1,800	1,118	413,000	313.4	Indian Ocean	Mozambique, Zimbabwe, South Africa, Botswana
75.	Chulym	1,799	1,118	134,000		Ob	Russia
76.	Guaviare	1,760	1,090	151,607	7,529	Orinoco	Colombia
77	Marañón	1,737	1,079	364,873	16,708	Amazon	Peru
78.	Indigirka	1,726	1,072	360,400	1,810	East Siberian Sea	Russia
79.	Platte	1,690	1,050	219,900	199.3	Missouri	United States
80.	Senegal	1,641	1,020	419,659	680	Atlantic Ocean	Guinea, Senegal, Mali, Mauritania
81.	Khatanga–Kotuy	1,636	1,017	364,000	3,200	Laptev Sea	Russia
82.	Upper Jubba-Ganale Dorya	1,634	1,015	214,441	316	Jubba River	Ethiopia (69%), Somalia (27%), Kenya (5%)
83.	Uruguay	1,610	1,000	353,451	7,058	Atlantic Ocean	Uruguay, Argentina, Brazil
84.	Churchill	1,609	1,000	281,300	1,200	Hudson Bay	Canada
85.	Blue Nile	1,600	994	326,400	1,548	Nile	Ethiopia, Sudan
85.	Okavango (Cubango)	1,600	994	530,000	475	Okavango Delta	Namibia, Angola, Botswana
85.	Volta	1,600	994	407,093	1,210	Gulf of Guinea	Ghana, Burkina Faso, Togo, Côte d'Ivoire, Benin
88.	Beni	1,599	994	283,350	8,900	Madeira	Bolivia
89.	Shilka-Onon	1,592	989	206,000	440	Amur	Russia (86%), Mongolia (14%)
90.	Tobol	1,591	989	426,000	805	Irtysh	Kazakhstan, Russia
91.	Alazeya	1,590	988	64,700	320	East Siberian Sea	Russia
92.	Kafue	1,576	979	155,000	320	Zambezi	Zambia (99.6%), Democratic Republic of the Congo (0.4%)
93.	Yalong	1,571	976	128,444	1,810	Yangtze	China
94.	Magdalena	1,550	963	263,858	8,058	Caribbean Sea	Colombia
95.	Han	1,532	952	174,300	1,632	Yangtze	China
96.	Kura/Mt'k'vari	1,515	941	188,400	575	Caspian Sea	Turkey, Georgia, Azerbaijan
97.	Oka	1,500	932	245,000	1,310	Volga	Russia
97.	Upper Murray	1,500	932	260,000		Lower Murray	Australia
99.	Yana-Sartang	1,492	927	238,000	1,110	Laptev Sea	Russia
100.	Pecos	1,490	926	115,000	7.5	Rio Grande	United States
101.	Murrumbidgee River	1,485	923	84,917	120	Murray River	Australia
102.	Upper Yenisey–Little Yenisey (Kaa-Hem)	1,480	920	360,000		Yenisey	Russia, Mongolia
103.	Godavari	1,465	910	312,812	3,061	Bay of Bengal	India
104.	Sangha-Ngoko-Dja	1,459	907	233,740		Congo	Cameroon (45%), Republic of Congo (31%), Central African Republic (25%)
105.	Vaal	1,458	906	196,438	125	Orange	South Africa
106.	Satluj	1,450	900	395,000	2,946.66	Chenab	China, India, Pakistan
107.	Ili (Yili)	1,439	870	140,000	480	Lake Balkhash	China, Kazakhstan
108.	Olyokma	1,436	892	210,000	2,110	Lena	Russia
109.	Upper Columbia	1,430	889	292,316	3,364	Columbia	United States, Canada
110.	Upper Tocantins	1,427	887	310,000		Tocantins	Brazil
111.	Belaya	1,420	882	142,000	858	Kama	Russia
111.	Cooper–Barcoo	1,420	880	297,950	36	Lake Eyre	Australia
113.	Dniester	1,411 (1,352)	877 (840)	72,100	310	Black Sea	Ukraine, Moldova
114.	Taz	1,401	871	150,000	1,450	Taz Estuary	Russia
115.	Benue	1,400	870	319,000	3,477	Niger	Cameroon, Nigeria
115.	Chari	1,400	870	548,747	1,059	Lake Chad	Chad, Cameroon, Niger, Nigeria
115.	Parnaíba	1,400	870	344,112		Atlantic Ocean	Brazil
115.	Warburton–Georgina	1,400	870	408,005	60	Lake Eyre	Australia
119.	Colorado (Texas)	1,387	862	103,000	73.9	Gulf of Mexico	United States
120.	Yamuna	1,376	855	366,223	2,950	Ganges	India
121.	Apaporis	1,370	851	57,430.6	4,092	Japurá	Colombia (93%), Brazil (7%),
121.	Nen (Nonni)	1,370	851	270,000		Songhua	China
121.	Vyatka	1,370	851	129,000	890	Kama	Russia
124.	Fraser	1,368	850	220,000	3,475	Pacific Ocean	Canada, United States
125.	Grande	1,360	845	143,000		Paraná	Brazil
126.	Kızıl River	1,355	734	115,000	400	Black Sea	Turkey
127.	Madre de Dios	1,347	837	125,000	4,915	Beni	Peru, Bolivia
128.	Liao-Xiliao-Laoha	1,345	836	232,000	500	Bohai Sea	China
129.	Lachlan River	1,339	832	84,700	49	Murrumbidgee River	Australia
130.	Narmada	1,333	828	98,796	1,447	Arabian Sea	India
131.	Hai	1,329	826	318,200	717	Bohai Sea	China
132.	Branco-Uraricoera	1,326	824	192,393	6,469	Rio Negro	Brazil (96%), Guyana (7%), Venezuela (1%)
133.	Iguaçu	1,320	820	67,537	1,746	Paraná	Brazil, Argentina
134.	Taseyeva-Chuna	1,319	820	128,000	740	Angara	Russia
135.	Javari	1,309	814	109,680	5,225	Amazon	Brazil (78%), Peru (22%)
136.	Northern Dvina–Sukhona	1,302	809	350,496	3,416	White Sea	Russia
137.	Inírida	1,300	808	53,816.9	3,385	Guaviare	Colombia
137.	Iriri	1,300	808	141,943	3,028	Xingu	Brazil
137.	Neva-Vuoksi	1,300	808	282,300	2,628	Gulf of Finland	Russia, Finland, Belarus
140.	Ruki	1,296	805	173,800	4,450	Congo	Democratic Republic of the Congo
141.	Krishna	1,290	800	258,948	2,213	Bay of Bengal	India
142.	Lomami	1,280	795	110,000		Congo	Democratic Republic of the Congo
143.	Ottawa	1,271	790	146,300	1,950	Saint Lawrence	Canada
144.	Rio Grande de Santiago-Lerma	1,270	789	119,543	320	Pacific Ocean	Mexico
145.	Guaporé (Itenez)	1,260	780	341,000	2,430	Mamoré	Brazil, Bolivia
146.	Red (Canada)-Assiniboine-Souris	1,260	780	287,500	244	Lake Winnipeg	Canada (56%), US (44%)
147.	Elbe–Vltava	1,252	778	148,268	711	North Sea	Germany, Czech Republic
148.	Zeya	1,242	772	233,000	1,810	Amur	Russia
149.	Juruena	1,240	771	192,628	4,936.7	Tapajós	Brazil
150.	Upper Mississippi	1,236	768	450,000	4,800	Mississippi	United States
151.	Rhine	1,233	768	185,000	2,330	North Sea	Germany (57.3%), Switzerland (15.1%), Netherlands (12.3%), France (12.2%), Luxembourg (1.4%), Austria (1.3%), Belgium (0.4%), Liechtenstein (0.1%), Italy (0.03%)
152.	Athabasca	1,231	765	95,300	783	Mackenzie	Canada
153.	Markha	1,231	765	99,000	405	Vilyuy	Russia
154.	Canadian	1,223	760	123,220	182.2	Arkansas	United States
155.	North Saskatchewan	1,220	758	122,800	238	Saskatchewan	Canada
156.	Kansas-Republican	1,218	757	155,690	205	Missouri	United States
157.	Vistula–Narew-Bug	1,213	754	194,424	1,080	Baltic Sea	Poland, Belarus, Ukraine, Slovakia
158.	Awash	1,200	746	69,197	152	Lake Abbe	Ethiopia, Djibouti
158.	Shire	1,200	746	160,000	486	Zambezi	Mozambique, Malawi
158.	Ogooué (or Ogowe)	1,200	746	223,856	5,890	Atlantic Ocean	Gabon, Republic of the Congo
161.	Fimi-Lukenie	1,194	742	133,432		Kasai	Democratic Republic of the Congo
162.	Mobile	1,192	741	115,000	1,900	Gulf of Mexico	United States
163.	Lukuga	1,184	736	244,500		Lualaba	Tanzania (62%), Democratic Republic of the Congo (26%), Zambia (6%), Burundi (5%), Rwanda (2%)
164.	Min-Dadu	1,182	734	133,000	2,850	Yangtze	China
165.	Markha	1,181	734	99,000	405	Vilyuy	Russia
166.	Aripuanã	1,175	730	147,224	4,064	Madeira	Brazil
167.	Milk	1,173	729	62,000	17.5	Missouri	United States, Canada
168.	Mun - Chi	1,162	722	119,180	725	Mekong River	Thailand
168.	White	1,162	722	71,910	834.8	Mississippi	United States
170.	Chindwin	1,158	720	114,685	4,740	Ayeyarwady	Myanmar
171.	Sankuru	1,150	715	150,000		Kasai	Democratic Republic of the Congo
171.	Wu	1,150	715	80,300	1,108	Yangtze	China
173.	Red (Asia)	1,149	714	143,700	4,300	Gulf of Tonkin	China, Vietnam
174.	James (Dakotas)	1,143	710	54,240	18.3	Missouri	United States
175.	Kapuas	1,143	710	98,749	6,012	South China Sea	Indonesia
176.	Paraíba do Sul	1,137	696	56,000		Atlantic Ocean	Brazil
177.	Yobe-Hadejia	1,135	705	183,009		Lake Chad	Nigeria (68%), Niger (32%)
178.	Desna	1,130	702	88,900	360	Dnieper	Russia, Belarus, Ukraine
178.	Helmand	1,130	702	150,000		Hamun-i-Helmand	Afghanistan, Iran
178.	Tietê	1,130	702	72,168	937	Paraná	Brazil
178.	Vychegda	1,130	702	121,000	1160	Northern Dvina	Russia
182.	Sepik	1,126	700	77,700	5,000	Pacific Ocean	Papua New Guinea, Indonesia
182.	Sobat-Pibor	1,126	700	225,000	412	White Nile	South Sudan (60%), Ethiopia (29%), Kenya (10%), Uganda (2%)
184.	Orkhon	1,124	698	132,835	66	Selenga	Mongolia
185.	Cimarron	1,123	698	49,100	32.9	Arkansas	United States
186.	Anadyr	1,120	696	191,000	2,020	Gulf of Anadyr	Russia
187.	Jialing River	1,119	695	160,000		Yangtze	China
188.	Liard	1,115	693	277,100	2,434	Mackenzie	Canada
189.	Omolon	1,114	692	113,000		Kolyma	Russia
190.	Mamberamo River	1,112	691	78,992	5,923	Pacific Ocean	Indonesia
191.	Cumberland	1,105	687	46,830	862	Mississippi	United States
192.	Omo	1,104	686	86,657	915.5	Lake Turkana	Ethiopia
193.	Bani	1,100	684	146,570		Niger	Mali (80%), Ivory Coast (15%), Burkina Faso (5%), Guinea (0.1%)
193.	Huallaga	1,100	684	90,000	3,800	Marañón	Peru
193.	Kwango	1,100	684	263,500	2,700	Kasai	Angola, Democratic Republic of the Congo
193.	Draa	1,100	684	95,000		Atlantic Ocean	Morocco
197.	Gambia	1,094	680	78,000		Atlantic Ocean	The Gambia, Senegal, Guinea
198.	Tyung	1,092	679	49,800		Vilyuy	Russia
199.	Barito River	1,090	680	81,675	5,497	Java Sea	Indonesia
200.	Maya	1,087	675	171,000	1,180	Aldan	Russia
201.	Yellowstone	1,080	671	114,260	390	Missouri	United States
201.	Ghaghara	1,080	671	127,950	2,990	Ganges	India, Nepal, China
203.	Huai River	1,078	670	270,000	1,110	Yangtze	China
204.	Aras	1,072	665	102,000	285	Kura	Turkey, Armenia, Azerbaijan, Iran
205.	Chu	1,067	663	62,500		none	Kyrgyzstan, Kazakhstan
205.	Sanaga-Djérem	1,067	663	140,000	2,072	Bight of Biafra	Cameroon, Nigeria, Central African Republic
207.	Seversky Donets	1,053 (1,078)	654 (670)	98,900	159	Don	Russia, Ukraine
208.	Bermejo	1,050	652	125,000		Paraguay	Argentina, Bolivia
208.	Cunene	1,050	652	108,943		Atlantic Ocean	Angola (85%), Namibia (15%)
208.	Fly	1,050	652	75,800	6,500	Gulf of Papua	Papua New Guinea, Indonesia
208.	Kuskokwim	1,050	652	120,000	1,900	Bering Sea	United States
212.	Tennessee	1,049	652	105,870	1,998	Ohio	United States
213.	Oder–Warta	1,045	649	118,861	550	Baltic Sea	Poland, Germany, Czech Republic
214.	Apure	1,038	645	167,000	2,300	Orinoco	Venezuela (99.8%), Colombia (0.2%)
215.	Logone	1,033	642	78,000	492	Chari	Chad (53%), Cameroon (34%), Central African Republic (14%)
216.	Aruwimi	1,030	640	116,100	2,200	Congo	Democratic Republic of the Congo
217.	Chambal	1,024	636	143,219	456	Yamuna	India
217.	Pur	1,024	636	112,000		Taz Estuary	Russia
219.	Daugava	1,020	634	87,900	678	Gulf of Riga	Latvia, Belarus, Russia
220.	Gila	1,015	631	151,000	7	Colorado (western U.S.)	United States
221.	Essequibo	1,014	630	156,828	5,136	Atlantic Ocean	Guyana, Venezuela
222.	Loire	1,012	629	115,271	840	Atlantic Ocean	France
223.	Khopyor	1,010	628	61,100	150	Don	Russia
224.	Tagus (Tajo/Tejo)	1,006	625	80,100	444	Atlantic Ocean	Spain, Portugal
225.	Flinders	1,004	624	109,000	122	Gulf of Carpentaria	Australia
226.	Koksoak	1,000	621	136,262	2,800	Ungava Bay	Canada
226.	Usumacinta	1,000	621	134,400		Gulf of Mexico	Mexico, Guatemala

=== Notes ===
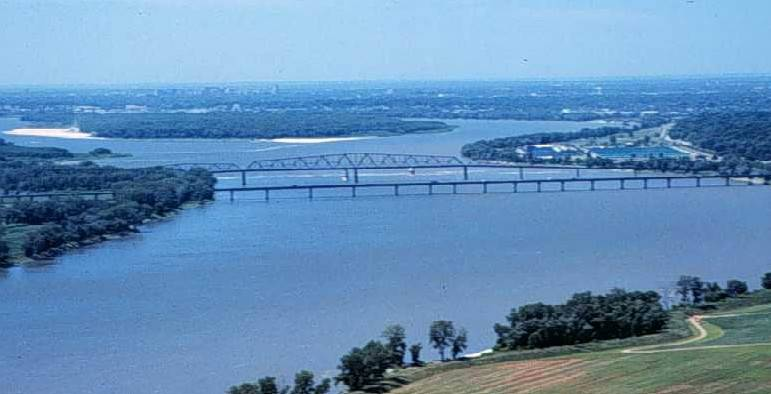
The Mississippi River just north of St. Louis

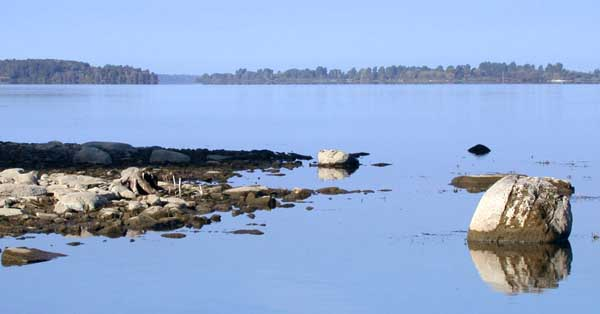
Saint Lawrence River along the New York-Quebec border

- When the length of a river is followed by an asterisk, it is an average of multiple information sources. If the difference in lengths between given information sources is significant, all lengths are listed.
- Scientists debate whether the Amazon or the Nile is the longest river in the world. Traditionally, the Nile is considered longer, but recent information suggests that the Amazon may be longer. Differences in the recorded length of the Amazon mainly depend on whether the course south of the Ilha de Marajó at the Amazon's mouth is to be treated as part of the Amazon, or as part of the separate Tocantins River. New evidence, (dated 16 June 2007) obtained from a high-altitude scientific venture in the Andes, claims that "the Amazon is longer than the Nile by 100 km, with its longest headwater being the Carhuasanta stream originating in the south of Peru on the Nevado Mismi mountain's northern slopes and flowing into the Río Apurímac". However, the origin of the river at Nevado Mismi had already been known more than one decade earlier (see Jacek Palkiewicz), and satellite based measuring from this origin to the Amazon mouth has resulted in not more than 6,400 km.
- Generally, the most commonly used/anglicised name of the river is used. The name in a native language or alternate spelling may be shown.

== River systems that may have existed in the past ==
=== Amazon–Congo ===
The Amazon basin formerly drained westwards into the Pacific Ocean, until the Andes rose and reversed the drainage.

The Congo basin is completely surrounded by high land, except for its long narrow exit valley past Kinshasa, including waterfalls around Manyanga. That gives the impression that most of the Congo basin was formerly on a much higher land level and that the Congo River was rejuvenated by much of its lower course being removed, likeliest when Africa split from South America when Gondwanaland broke up due to continental drift, and before that, the Congo would likely have flowed into the Amazon, producing a river around 6000 miles or 10,000 km long.

=== West Siberian Glacial Lake drainage ===
This river would have been about 10,000 km (6,200 mi) long, in the last ice age. Its longest headwater was the Selenga river of Mongolia: it drained through ice-dammed lakes and the Aral Sea and the Caspian Sea to the Black Sea.

=== Lobourg ===
During the last glacial maximum, much of what is now the southern part of the North Sea was land, known to archaeologists as Doggerland. At this time, the Thames, the Meuse, the Scheldt, and the Rhine probably joined before flowing into the sea, in a system known by palaeogeographers as the Loubourg or Lobourg River System. There is some debate as to whether this river would have flowed southwest into what is now the English Channel, or flowed north, emerging into the North Sea close to modern Yorkshire. If the latter hypothesis is true, the Rhine would have attained a length of close to 1,650 kilometres (1,030 mi). The former hypothesis would have produced a shorter river, some 1,400 kilometres (870 mi) in length. Current scientific research favours the former opinion, with the Thames and Rhine meeting in a large lake, the outflow of which was close to the present-day Straits of Dover.

== See also ==
- Lists of rivers
- List of drainage basins by area
- List of rivers by discharge
- List of river films and television series
- List of rivers of Antarctica

== Notes and references ==
Notes
