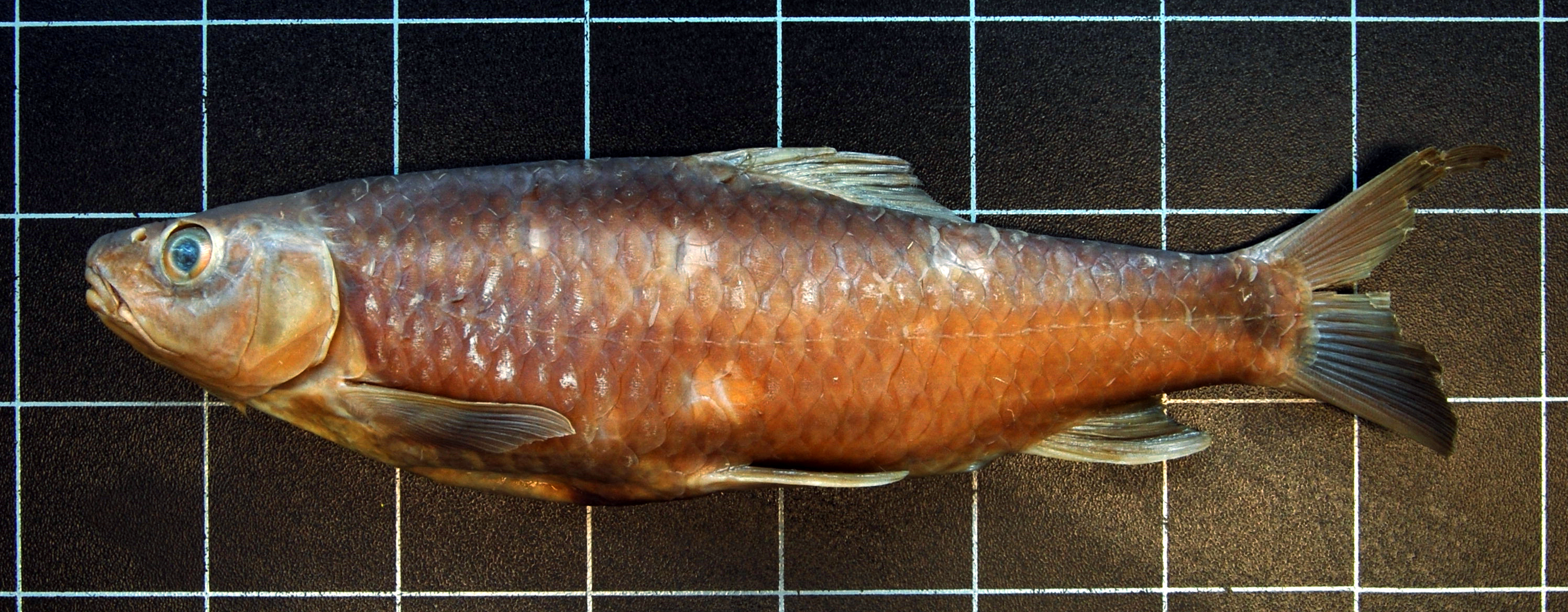

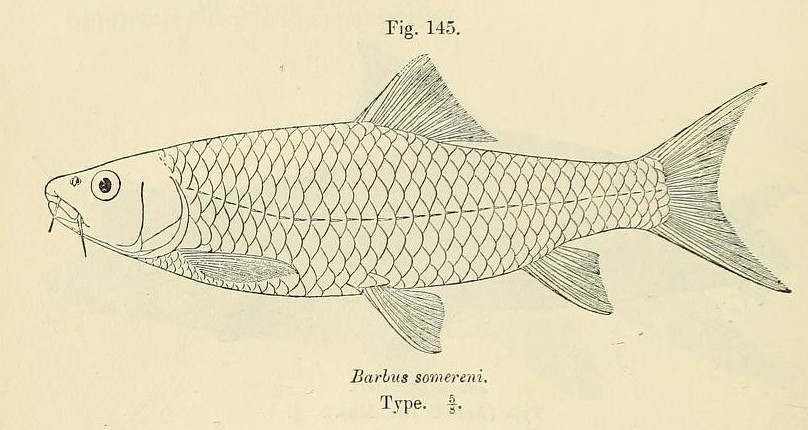

Conservation status
- Least Concern (IUCN 3.1)

Scientific classification
- Kingdom: Animalia
- Phylum: Chordata
- Class: Actinopterygii
- Order: Cypriniformes
- Family: Cyprinidae
- Subfamily: Torinae
- Genus: Labeobarbus
- Species: L. somereni

Binomial name
- Labeobarbus somereni (Boulenger, 1911)

Synonyms
- Barbus somereni Boulenger, 1911; Barbus altianalis urundensis David, 1937; Barbus urundensis Poll, 1946

= Labeobarbus somereni =

Species of fish

Labeobarbus somereni, or Someren's barb, is a species of ray-finned fish in the family Cyprinidae. It is found in Burundi, Rwanda, Tanzania, and Uganda. Its natural habitat is rivers. It is not considered a threatened species by the IUCN. Local names for the fish in Rwanda include ikinanga, inkwenwe (Middle Akagera), ifurwe (Satinsyi) and urwozi (Nyabarongo).

It was first described by George Albert Boulenger in 1911. Its holotype was caught by Victor Van Someren and its type locality was described as: "the Sebwe River, a snow-water stream on Mount Ruwenzori, in Uganda, at an altitude of 6,000 feet (1,800 m)." The holotype is at the Natural History Museum, London. It was initially placed in the genus Barbus but is now classified as a Labeobarbus species. It might be able to hybridize with L. ruwenzorii, and it might be a senior synonym of L. mirabilis.

In Tanzania, it has been recorded at high altitudes in the headwaters of rivers including the Victoria River, Tanganyika River, Kagera River, and the Malagarasi River. In Rwanda it has been recorded in the Ruzizi basin and the Upper and Middle Akagera River, on either side of the Rusumo Falls. The International Union for Conservation of Nature designate L. somereni as a least-concern species, saying it is "relatively widespread", although it's possible some subpopulations might be at risk from various local threats such as increased farming. It is omnivorous, although primarily herbivorous; it mostly eats aquatic plants and filamentous algae.
