= Mukungwa River =

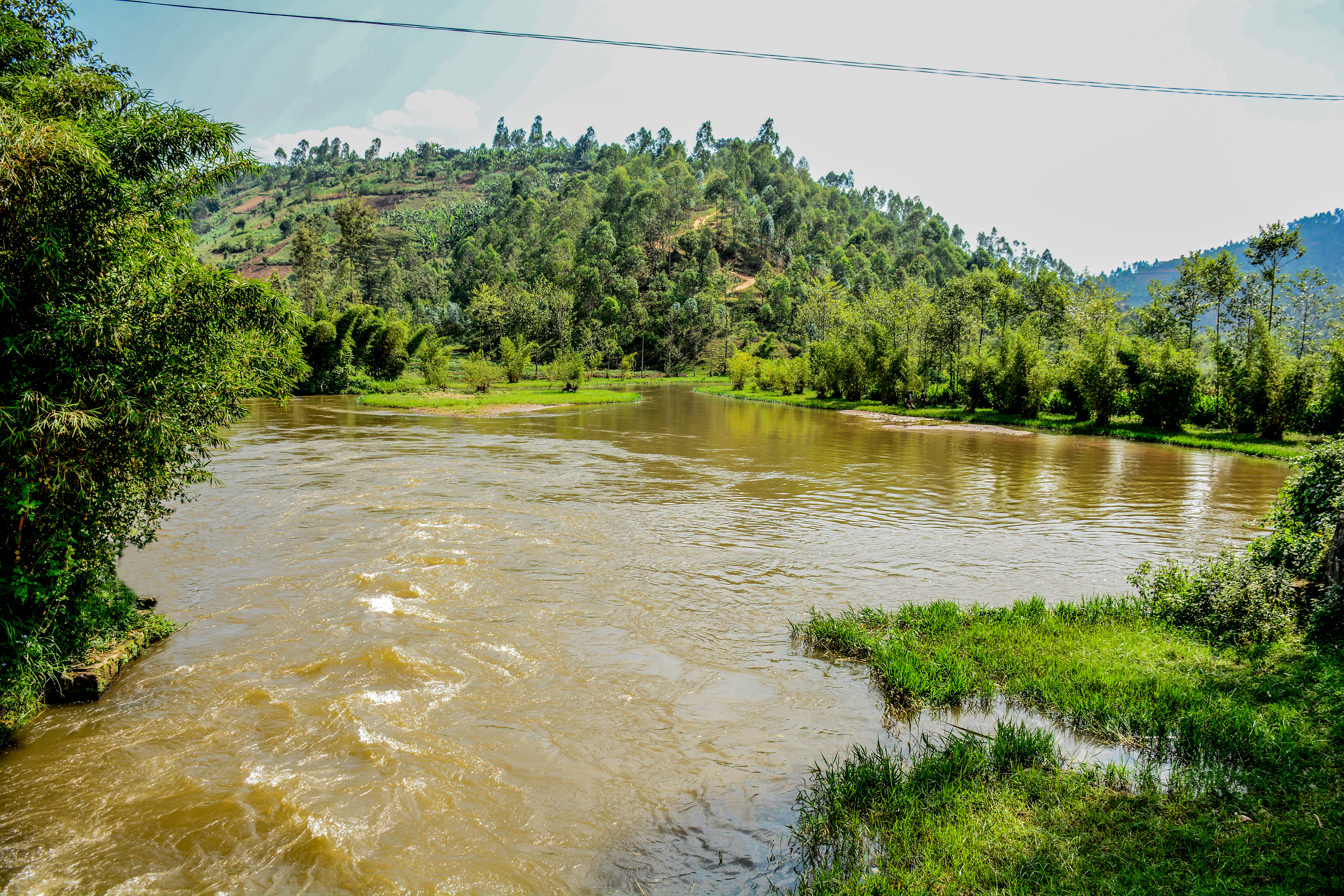

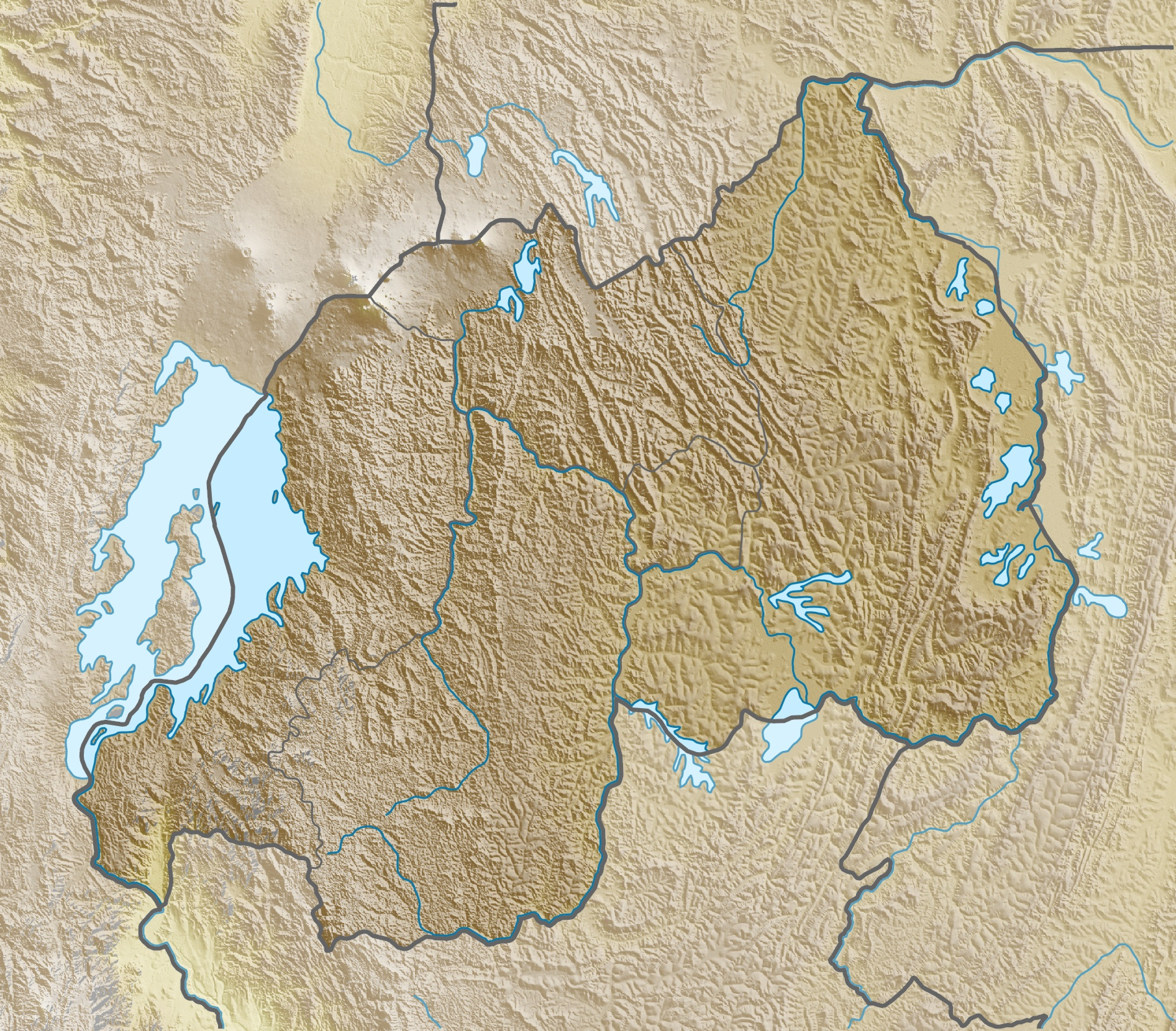
- Location within Rwanda
- Native name: Mto Mukungwa (Swahili)

Location
- Country: Rwanda
- State: Northern Province

Physical characteristics
- Source: Lake Ruhondo
  - coordinates: 1.51975°S 29.71080°E
- Basin size: 1,949 km

Basin features
- Progression: Mukungwa→ Nyabarongo→ Kagera→ Lake Victoria→ Nile→ Mediterranean Sea
- River system: Kagera-Nile
- Population: 1,332,493 (2012)
- Tributaries
  - left: Gaseke, Nyarutovu
  - right: Cyuve, Susa, Nyamutera, Giciye, Rubagabaga

The Mukungwa is a river located in Rwanda. It is a tributary of the Nyawarongo River that flows into Lake Victoria, the Nile River and the Mediterranean Sea.
