= Skłodowska-Curie District =

Skłodowskiej-Curie District Dzielnica Skłodowskiej-Curie
- District
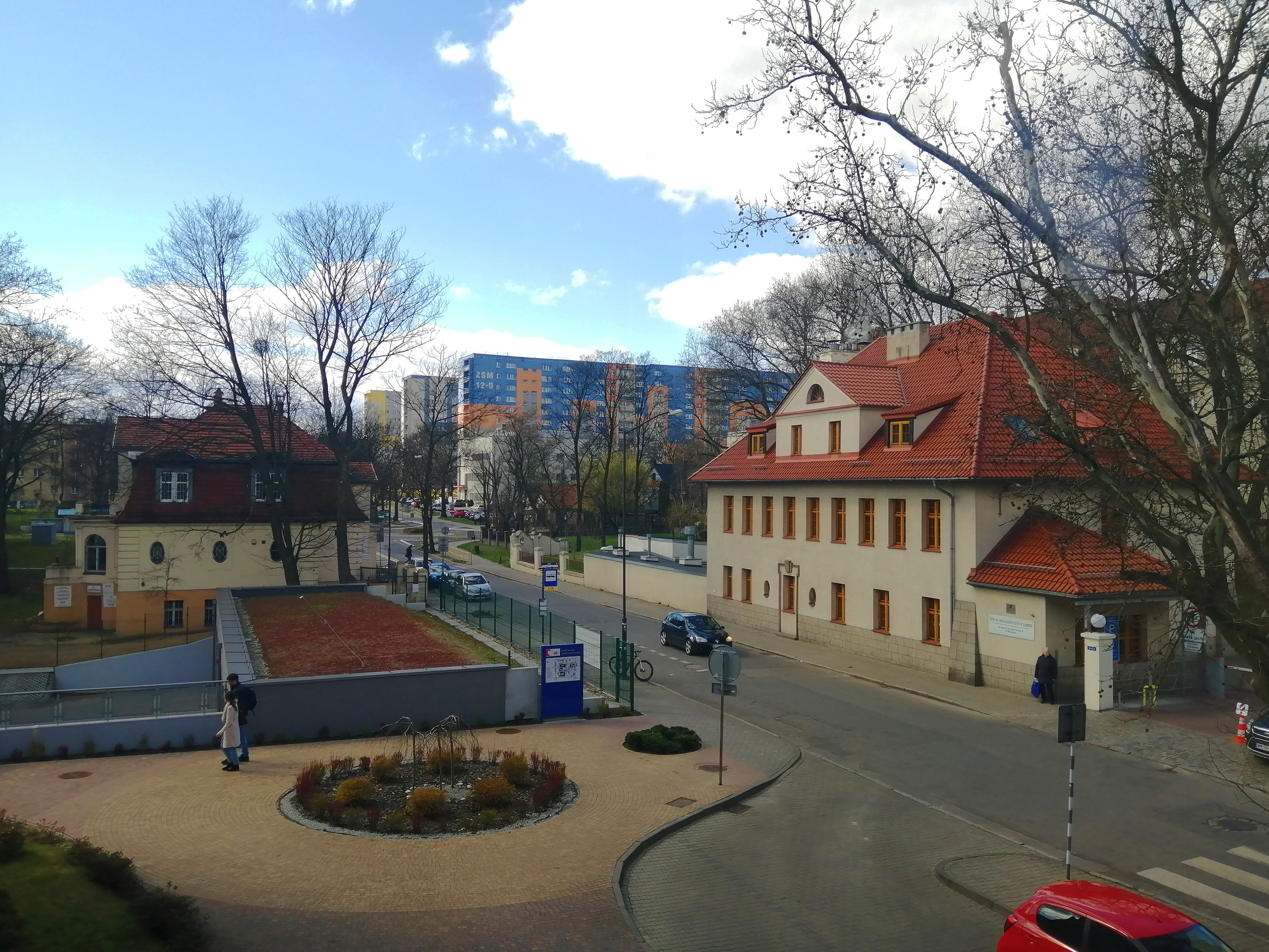
- Maria Curie-Skłodowska Street, one of the streets in Maria Curie-Skłodowska District

- Skłodowskiej-Curie District in Zabrze
- Established: 2021
- Named for: Maria Curie-Skłodowska

Area
  - Total: 1.9 km^{2} (0.73 sq mi)

Skłodowskiej-Curie District is a district of Zabrze, Poland, which is located in the central part of the city. It was established in 2021.

== Location ==
Skłodowska-Curie District is located in the centre of Zabrze. It has an area of 1.9 square kilometres (0.7 sq mi). From the north, it borders with Osiedle Mikołaja Kopernika and Mikulczyce, from the south with Zandka and Śródmieście, from the east with Biskupice and from the west with Osiedle Tadeusza Kotarbińskiego. The borders of the district are designated by Aleja Jana Nowaja-Jeziorańskiego and Przystankowa Street from the north, Bronisław Hager street from the east, Bytomka river, Park Hutniczy, Mikulczycka Street and Mieczysław Niedziałkowski Street from the south and Wojciech Korfanty Street from the west.

== History ==
The district was established in late 2021. Before its establishment, it was a part of Centrum Północ District. The first elections were held on 20 March 2022, when 15 councillors were elected from 28 candidates. The headquarters of the district council is located at 38A Jagiellońska Street.

== Public communication ==
Public transport in the district consists of buses and tramways, which is the responsibility of Zarząd Transportu Metropolitalnego since 1 January 2019.
