= Rusumo Hydroelectric Power Station =

Dam in Rusumo Falls, Kirehe District, Rwanda

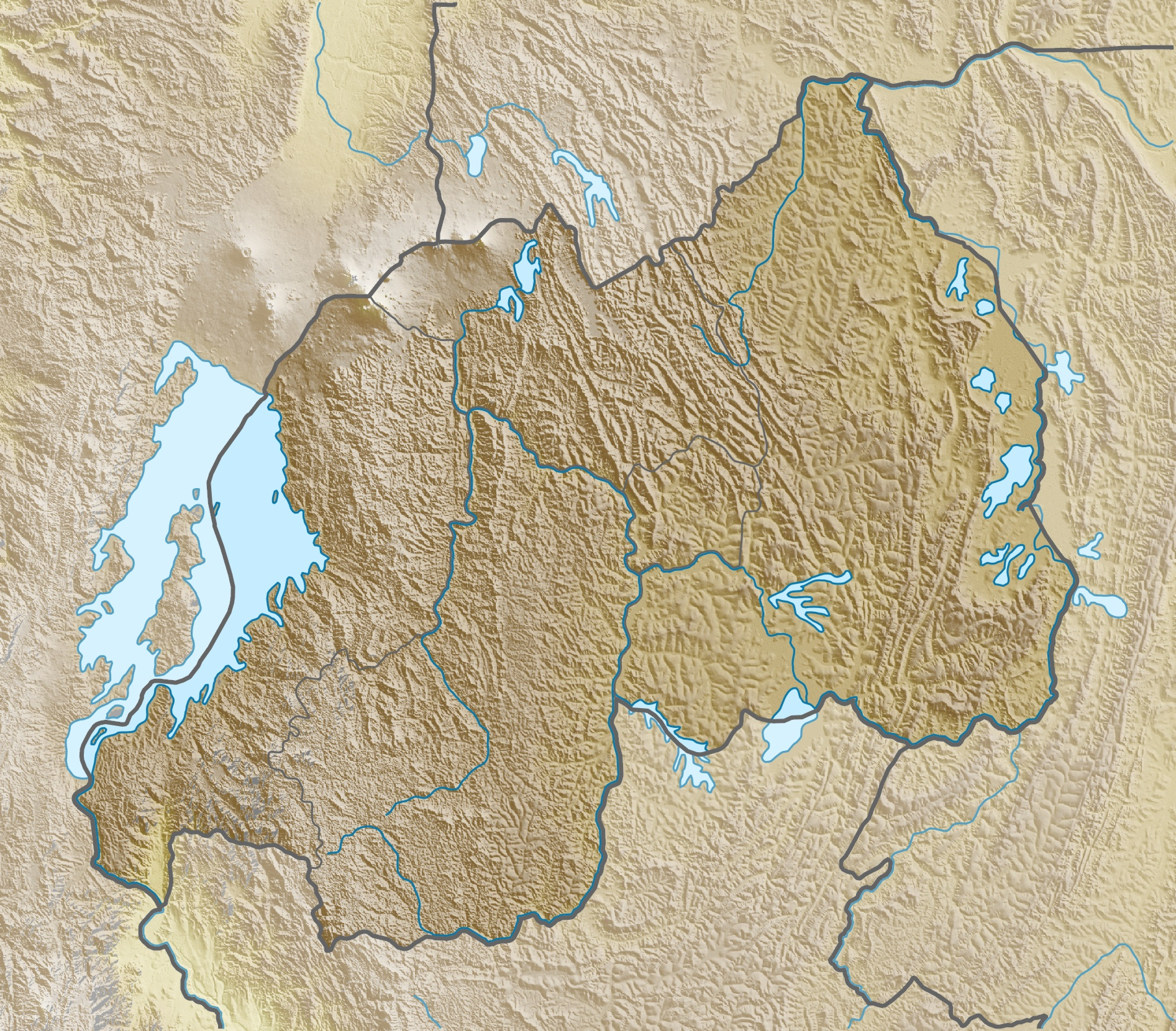
- Map of Rwanda showing the location of Rusumo Falls
- Official name: Urugomero rw'amashanyarazi rwa Rusumo; Centrale hydroélectrique de Rusumo
- Country: Rwanda
- Location: Rusumo Falls, Kirehe District
- Coordinates: 02°22′47″S 30°47′09″E
- Purpose: Power
- Status: Operational
- Construction began: 2017
- Opening date: 2024
- Construction cost: US$468 million
- Operator: Rusumo Power Company Limited

Dam and spillways
- Impounds: Kagera River

Reservoir
- Normal elevation: 1,325 m (4,347 ft)

Power Station
- Commission date: 2023 (expected)
- Type: Run-of-the-river
- Turbines: 3
- Installed capacity: 80 MW (110,000 hp)

The Rusumo Hydroelectric Power Station (Kinyarwanda: Urugomero rw'amashanyarazi rwa Rusumo, French: Centrale hydroélectrique de Rusumo), also known as the Rusumo Power Station, is an operational hydropower plant, with initial capacity installation of 80 megawatts (110,000 hp). The project involved the construction of a dam, with run of river design. A more expensive 90 megawatts (120,000 hp) reservoir design was considered before being abandoned in favor of an 80 MW project with a smaller environmental impact and an estimated cost of US$300 million compared to US$400 million for the bigger project.

The World Bank announced on 6 August 2013 that it had approved loans totaling US$340 million towards the US$468.60 million needed for the project. In November 2013, the African Development Bank approved a loan of US$113 million towards completion of the project.

== Location ==
The power station is on the Kagera River, along Rwanda's border with Tanzania and approximately 2 kilometres (1.2 mi) downstream of the tripoint where the two countries share a common border with Burundi. The project is sited at Rusumo Falls, near the town of Rusumo, approximately 164.5 kilometres (102.2 mi), by road, southeast of Kigali, the capital and largest city of Rwanda. Rusumo Falls is approximately 61 kilometres (38 mi), by road, south-east of the provincial headquarters at Kibungo, in Ngoma District. The approximate coordinates of the power station are: 02°22'47.0"S, 30°47'09.0"E (Latitude:-2.379722; Longitude:30.785833).

== Other considerations ==
The power generated will be shared equally among the countries of Burundi, Rwanda, and Tanzania. The power will be evacuated from the generation plant via 220 kilovolt transmission lines to transmission stations in: Gitega, Burundi, a distance of 158 kilometres (98 mi); Kigali, Rwanda, a distance of 115 kilometres (71 mi); and Nyakanazi, Tanzania, a distance of 98 kilometres (61 mi).

== Developments ==
In November 2016, two contracts that paved the way for construction of the power station were signed in Kigali, Rwanda. The first contract was between Rusumo Power Company Limited and a consortium of contractors that included a joint venture composed of CGCOC Group Limited and Jiangxi Water & Hydropower Construction Company Limited. This contract provides for the performance of civil works, including supply and installation of hydro-mechanical equipment.

The second contract was signed between Rusumo Power Company Limited and a consortium of companies, including Rusumo Falls Andritz Hydro GmbH of Germany and Andritz Hydro PVT Limited of India, to carry out electrical and mechanical works for power generation.

As of November 2016, the projected cost of the project was $340 million, to be financed by The World Bank. The three high voltage transmission lines that will evacuate the power generated were projected to cost $121 million, financed by the African Development Bank. Construction was planned to begin in January 2017.

== Construction ==
The ground-breaking ceremony was held at Ngara, in Tanzanian territory on 30 March 2017, attended by government officials from the three beneficiary countries; all members of the regional East African Community. The power station is owned by Rusumo Power Company Limited (RPCL), a special purpose vehicle company, owned by the three countries. Two contractors were selected for the project. A Joint Venture between CGCOC Group and Jiangxi Water & Hydropower Construction Company Limited is responsible for the civil works, while ANDRITZ Hydro from Germany and India are responsible for the electro-mechanical works.

The Coordination Unit of the Nile Equatorial Lakes Subsidiary Action Program (NELSAP-CU) is implementing the project on behalf of the owners. Completion and commercial commissioning were expected in 2020.

Construction work on this project was estimated at 35 percent as of February 2019, and 59 percent as of January 2020.

As of April 2021, completion was anticipated in 2022, with one of the three power-generating units expected online in the fourth quarter of 2021.

As of June 2021, with 80 percent of the work completed, commercial commissioning was anticipated in December 2021.

Audits by the Auditor Generals of the three affected countries, carried out in the second half of 2021, have revealed a 22 percent increase in expenditure, up to that point in the work plan, above what was budgeted. At that time work completion was estimated at 81 percent. As of August 2022, an estimated 95 percent of the work was complete. Completion is anticipated in November 2022, with commercial commissioning in December 2022. Later that month, commercial communication was pushed back to the first quarter of 2023.

Completion and commercial commissioning were achieved in H1 2024.

== See also ==
- List of power stations in Rwanda
