= Bwakira =

Bwakira may refer to:

- Nicholas Bwakira, a Burundian diplomat
- Bwakira, Rwanda, a town in Western Province, Rwanda
