= Rusumo International Bridge =

Bridge linking Rwanda and Tanzania

Rusumo International Bridge Daraja la Kimataifa Rusumo (Swahili)
- Coordinates: 2°22′56″S 30°46′59″E
- Carries: B3 road (2 lanes)
- Crosses: Kagera River
- Preceded by: Rusumo Bridge
- Followed by: Kyaka Bridge

Characteristics
- Total length: 80 metres (260 ft)
- Width: 10.5 metres (34 ft)

History
- Construction start: April 2012
- Construction end: August 2014
- Replaces: Rusumo Bridge

Rusumo International Bridge is an international bridge, opened in 2014, across the Kagera River. It replaces the previous single lane Rusomo Bridge linking Rwanda and Tanzania. The project was funded by the Japan International Cooperation Agency.

== See also ==
- List of international bridges
