= Bytomka =

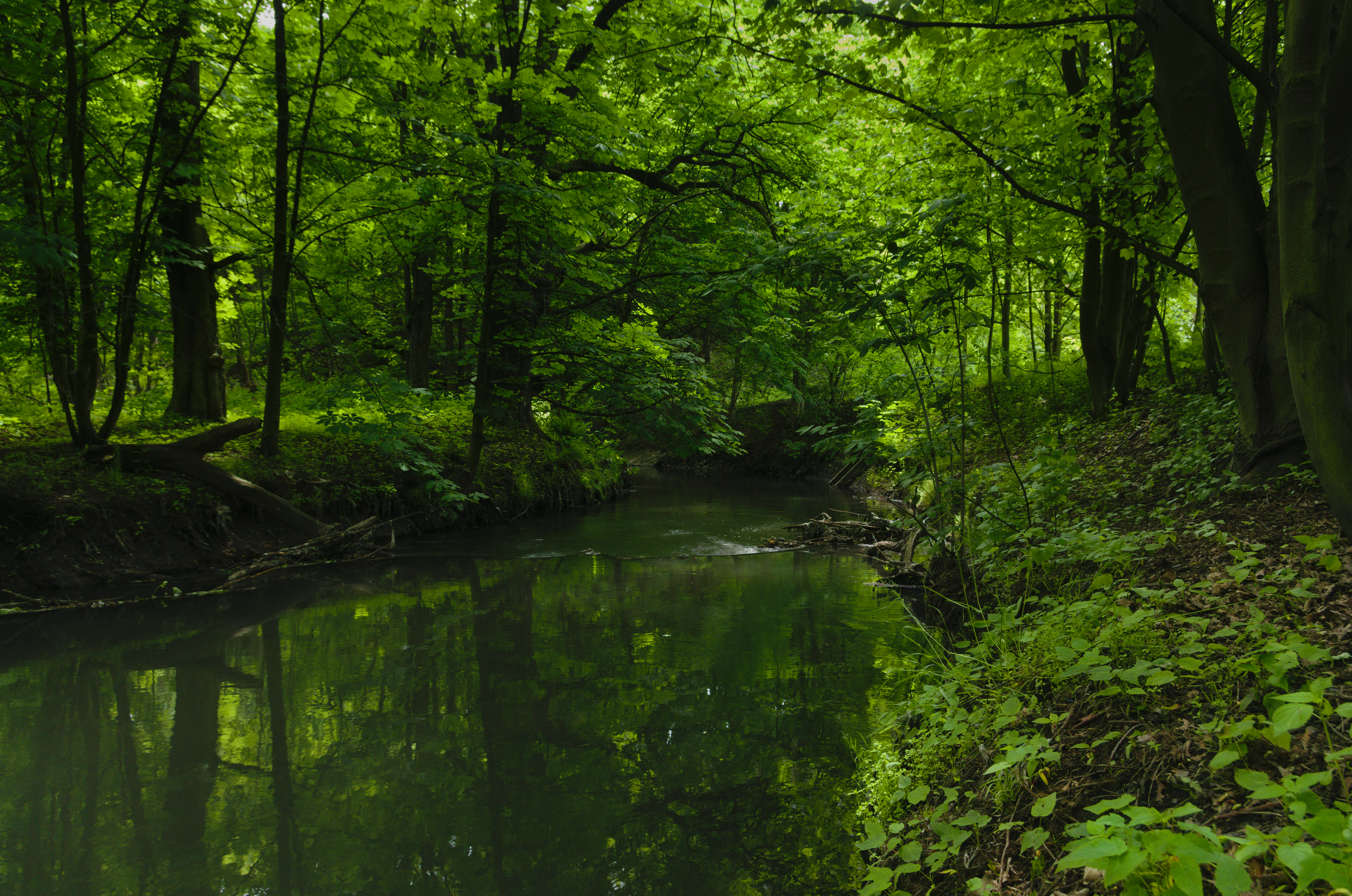
- Bytomka in Bytom

Location
- Country: Poland

Physical characteristics
- Mouth: Kłodnica
  - location: Gliwice, Silesian Voivodeship
  - coordinates: 50°17′11″N 18°42′41″E
- Length: 19.2 km (11.9 mi)

Bytomka (German: Beuthener Wasser or Iserbach) is a river located in southern Poland, in Silesia. It is approximately 19.2 km (11.9 mi) in length.

In the interwar period it was a part of the Germany-Poland border.

The river is highly polluted with heavy metals, notably cadmium, copper, mercury, nickel and zinc. The cause of pollution is thought to be human activity.
