= Rusumo, Rwanda =

- Location in Rwanda
- Coordinates: 02°22′50″S 30°46′38″E
- Country: Rwanda
- Admin. Province: Eastern Province
- District: Kirehe District

Rusumo, is a town in Kirehe District in the Eastern Province of Rwanda.

== Location ==
Rusumo is located in the southern part of Eastern Province, at the international border with Tanzania, approximately 83 kilometres (52 mi), southeast of Rwamagana, the location of the provincial headquarters. This is approximately 136 kilometres (85 mi), by road, southeast of Kigali, the capital and largest city in Rwanda.

== Overview ==
Rusumo is a border town, sitting at the border with neighboring Tanzania. In January 2015, the completed one-stop border post was opened to the public. Customs and immigration officials from both countries clear travelers once, in the country they are exiting. This cuts down on time spent at the border and allows from more travelers to be processed, with less hassle. The border post was officially jointly commissioned by the presidents of both countries on Wednesday, 6 April 2016.

Rusumo lies immediately west of Rusumo Falls, on the Kagera River, near the site where the proposed Rusumo Hydroelectric Power Station is currently under construction.
