= Rukarara River =

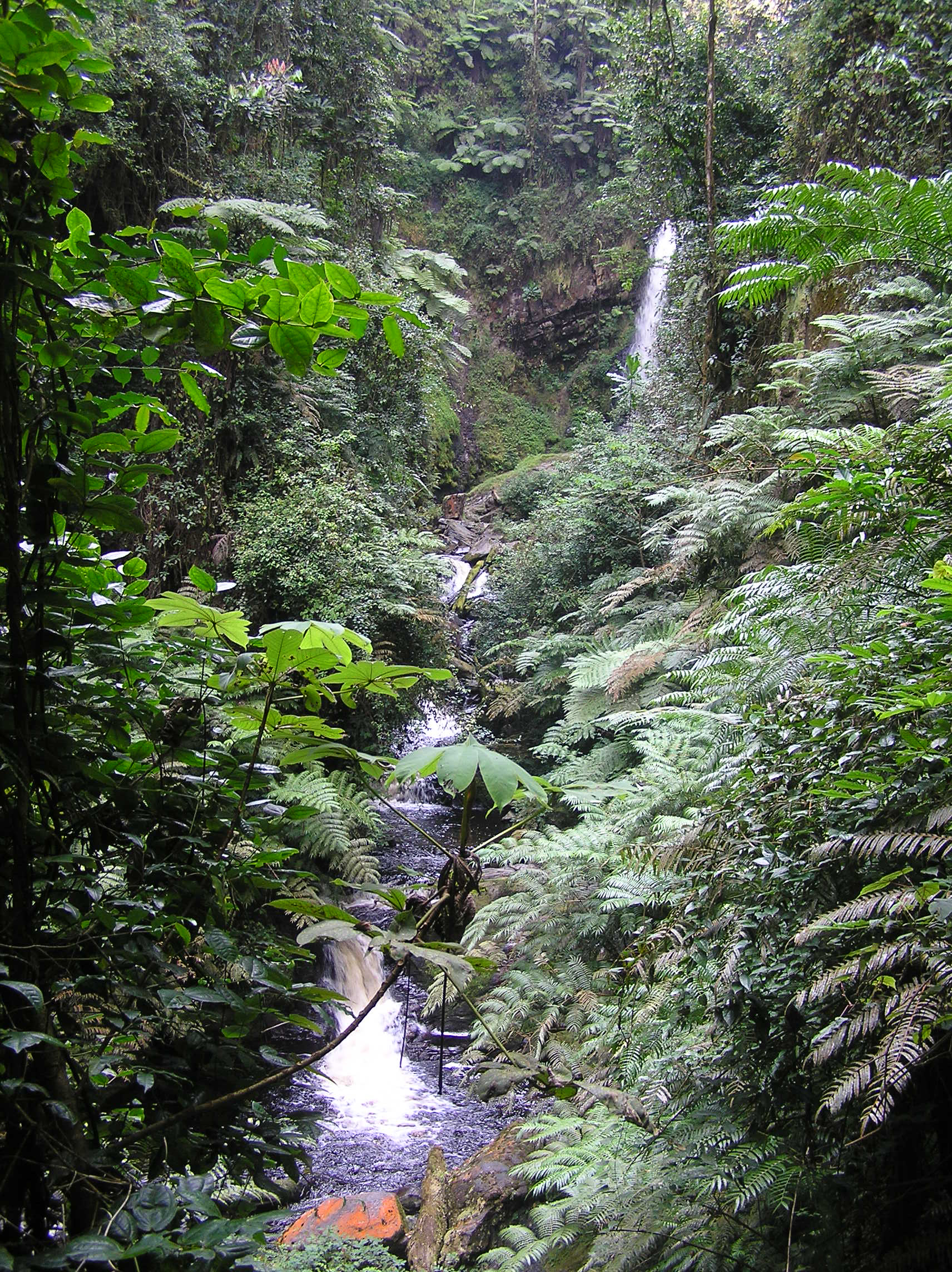

Location
- Country: Rwanda

Physical characteristics
- Source
  - coordinates: 2.282212°S 29.331242°E
- Mouth
  - coordinates: 2.437457°S 29.493914°E
- Basin size: 280 km^{2} (110 sq mi)

Basin features
- River system: Nyabarongo River

The Rukarara River (or Lukarara) is a river in western Rwanda that is a tributary of the Mwogo River, in turn a tributary of the Nyabarongo River. It is the most distant headwater of the Nile.

== Sources ==
The Rukarara rises in forested country in southern Rwanda to the east of the Congo-Nile Divide. The Kamiranzovu Swamp in the Nyungwe Forest Reserve provides a natural reservoir for the Rukarara. The source of the Rukarara is now known to be the overall source of the Nile. This was confirmed by a 2005/2006 expedition up the river with modern navigation equipment. The origin of the Nile, the furthest source from its mouth, is at an elevation of 7,966 feet (2,428 m), at latitude and longitude 2°16′055.962″S 29°19′052.470″E.

== Course ==
The Rukarara has its sources in the Nyamagabe District. The Nyirabugoyi and Rubyiro rivers are its main headwaters, both rising in the Nyungwe National Park. The Rukarara is the longest of the streams that supply the Mwogo. The Rukarara flows south and then east, emptying into the Mwogo River. The Mwogo flows north, merging with the Mbirurume River south of Bwakira to become the Nyabarongo River.

== Sources ==
- Brakspear, Patrick (2008). On Safari in Africa: 101 Things to Know When You Go. On Safari in Africa. p. 20. ISBN 978-0-9805048-0-4.
- Briggs, Philip; Booth, Janice (2010-03-16). Rwanda. Bradt Travel Guides. p. 154. ISBN 978-1-84162-306-1.
- Dumont, Henri J. (2009). The Nile: Origin, Environments, Limnology and Human Use. Springer. p. 2. ISBN 978-1-4020-9726-3.
- Hughes, Ralph H.; Hughes, Jane S.; Bernacsek, G. M. (1992). Iucn Directory of African Wetlands. IUCN. p. 205. ISBN 978-2-88032-949-5.
- ITMB Publishing (2007). Rwanda/Burundi Travel Map. Richmond, British Columbia: International Travel Maps. ISBN 978-1-55341-380-6.
- "Nyamagabe Administrative Map" (PDF). National Institute of Statistics of Rwanda. Archived from the original (PDF) on 2012-11-13.
