= Mwogo River =

River in Rwanda

Location
- Country: Rwanda

Physical characteristics
- Mouth
  - coordinates: 2.208477°S 29.561634°E

Basin features
- River system: Nyabarongo River
- Tributaries
  - left: Rukarara River, Mbirurume River

The Mwogo River is a river in western Rwanda that is a tributary of the Nyabarongo River.

== Course ==
The Mwogo rises in forested country in southern Rwanda to the east of the Congo-Nile Divide. It has its sources in the Kitabi sector of the Nyamagabe District. It runs eastward past Nyarusiza into the Huye District. It runs in a northeast direction through the western part of this district, entering the Nyanza district. In Nyanza district it runs northeast, passing Mweya at the point where the Gihimbi River enters it from the left. Below this point it is joined by the Rukarara River from the left. It then forms the western boundary of Ruhango District until it is joined from the left by the Mbirurume River just south of Bwakira. The combined stream is called the Nyabarongo River, which continues northward. (Note: The Rukarara tributary is the most distant source of the Nile.)

== Hydrology ==
The Mwogo is one of the main headwaters of the Nyawarungu river. Measurements of precipitation and evaporation at the Nyabisindu station show that the Mwogo river basin produces an average annual water flow of 252 millimetres (9.9 in). In parts of the river valley the hills have been cleared of trees, causing erosion and silting problems. Efforts are being made to replant trees. The Mwogo and Rukarara provide is the main source of water for the town of Nyanza.
