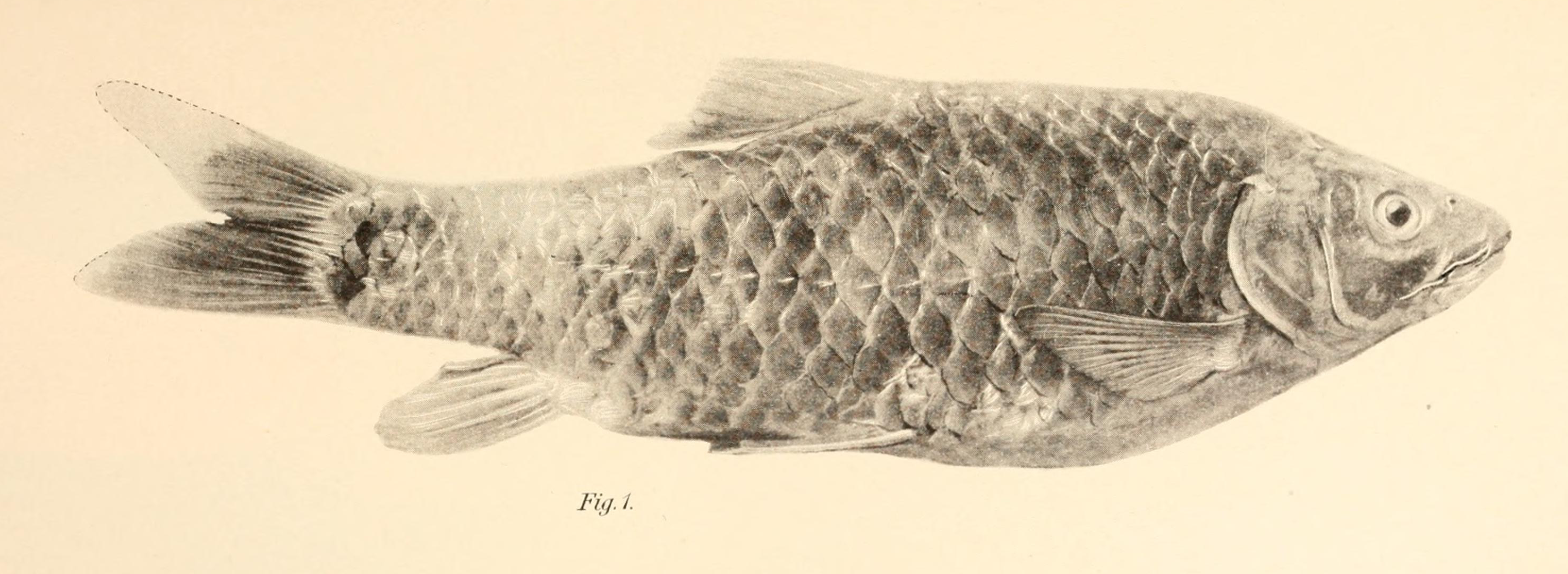

Conservation status
- Data Deficient (IUCN 3.1)

Scientific classification
- Kingdom: Animalia
- Phylum: Chordata
- Class: Actinopterygii
- Order: Cypriniformes
- Family: Cyprinidae
- Subfamily: Torinae
- Genus: Labeobarbus
- Species: L. mirabilis

Binomial name
- Labeobarbus mirabilis (Pappenheim in Pappenheim and Boulenger, 1914)

Synonyms
- Barbus mirabilis Pappenheim in Pappenheim and Boulenger, 1914

= Labeobarbus mirabilis =

Species of fish

Labeobarbus mirabilis is a species of ray-finned fish in the genus Labeobarbus. Its type locality is the Ituri River, near Mawambi, Ituri Province, Democratic Republic of the Congo. It has not been found in other locations. This species was initially placed in the genus Barbus, but is now considered to be a member of Labeobarbus. Some experts have raised the possibility that, with more research, L. mirabilis might become classified as a junior synonym of L. somereni.
