= Rusumo Bridge =

Bridge linking Rwanda and Tanzania

Rusumo Bridge Daraja la Rusumo (Swahili)
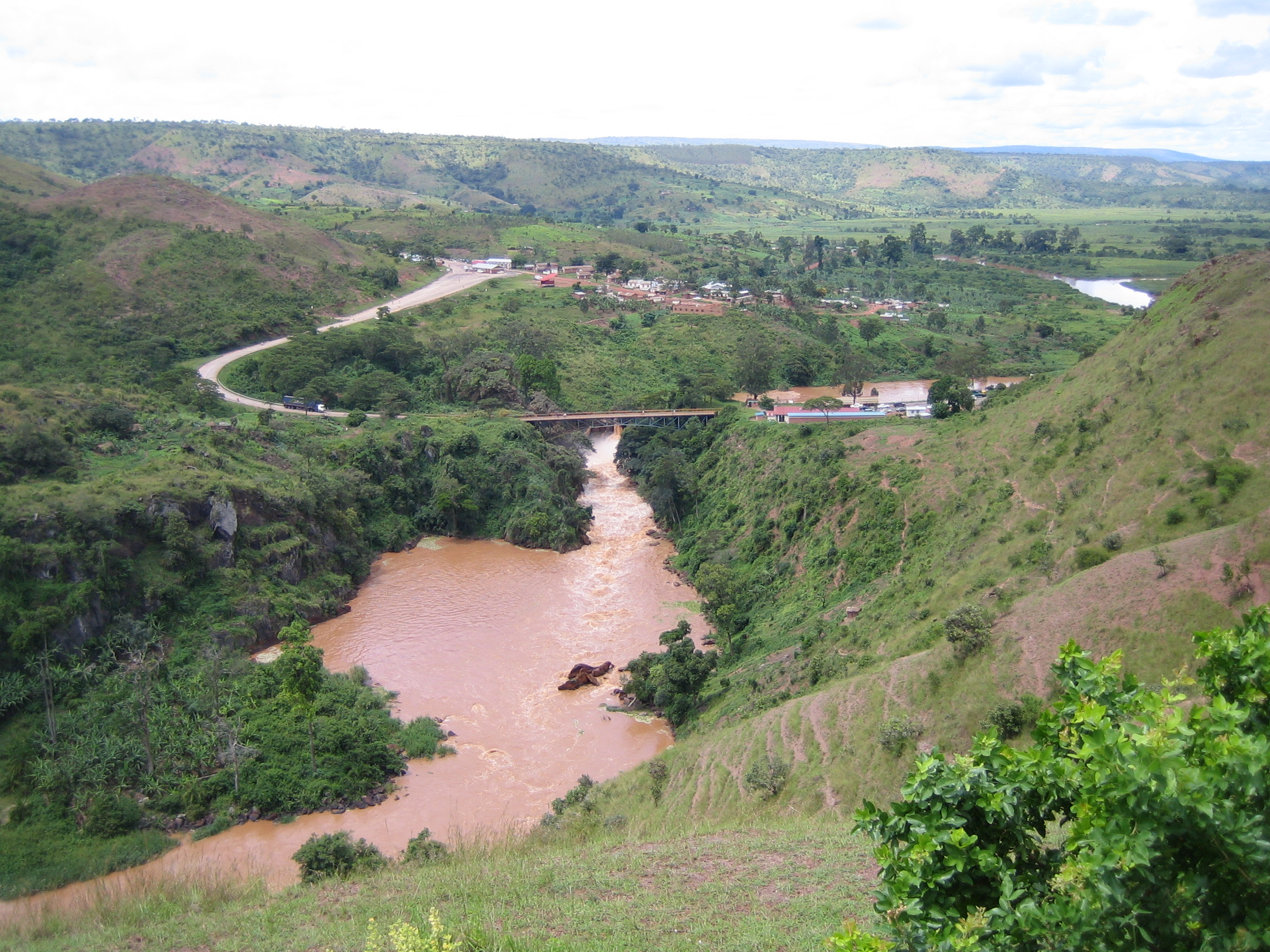
- Coordinates: 2°22′56.35″S 30°46′59.64″E
- Carries: B3 road (1 lane)
- Crosses: Kagera River
- Followed by: Kyaka Bridge

Characteristics
- Material: Steel
- Total length: 100 metres (330 ft)
- Width: 3.5 metres (11 ft)
- Load limit: 2 x 200 kN (2 x 22.5 tons)

History
- Architect: Luigi Corradi
- Designer: Luigi Corradi
- Constructed by: S.A.E. s.p.a.
- Construction start: 1971
- Opened: 1972
- Inaugurated: 1972

Rusumo Bridge is an international bridge across the Kagera River linking Rwanda and Tanzania.

== History ==
Designed by Luigi Corradi and assembled previously in Turin, Italy. The bridge was completed in 1972 as a single-deck steel bridge over a span of 64 metres (210 ft). The structure was the first road bridge across the Kagera River in Rusumo area. The bridge is an arch bridge whose construction commenced in 1966.

On 28 April 1994, during the Rwandan genocide, more than 200,000 people crossed the bridge at Rusumo Falls into Tanzania within 24 hours in what field workers described as "the largest and fastest refugee exodus in modern times".

Given the restrictions on the axle load and the use of only a single lane at a time, a new bridge, the Rusumo International Bridge, adjacent to the single lane bridge, was opened in 2014 to cope with expected increase of the traffic volume between Rwanda and Tanzania in the coming years.

== See also ==
- List of international bridges
