= Mbirurume River =

Location
- Country: Rwanda

Physical characteristics
- Mouth
  - coordinates: 2.204875°S 29.559917°E

Basin features
- River system: Nyabarongo River

The Mbirurume (also called Bilirume, Biruruma, Birurume, Bitirume) is a river in western Rwanda that is a tributary of the Nyabarongo River.

The Mbirurume rises in forested country in southern Rwanda to the east of the Congo-Nile Divide. It originates in the extreme north of the Nyungwe National Park, in the Nyamagabe District. It flows in a northeast direction, entering Karongi District and passes Mukungu to the west, then runs in a northeast direction along the border between Nyamagabe and Karongi districts. It then turns southeast shortly before meeting the Mwogo River from the left. The combined rivers form the Nyabarongo River, which flows northward along the eastern slopes of the Nile-Congo divide.
