= Rusumo Falls =

Waterfall in Rwanda and Tanzania

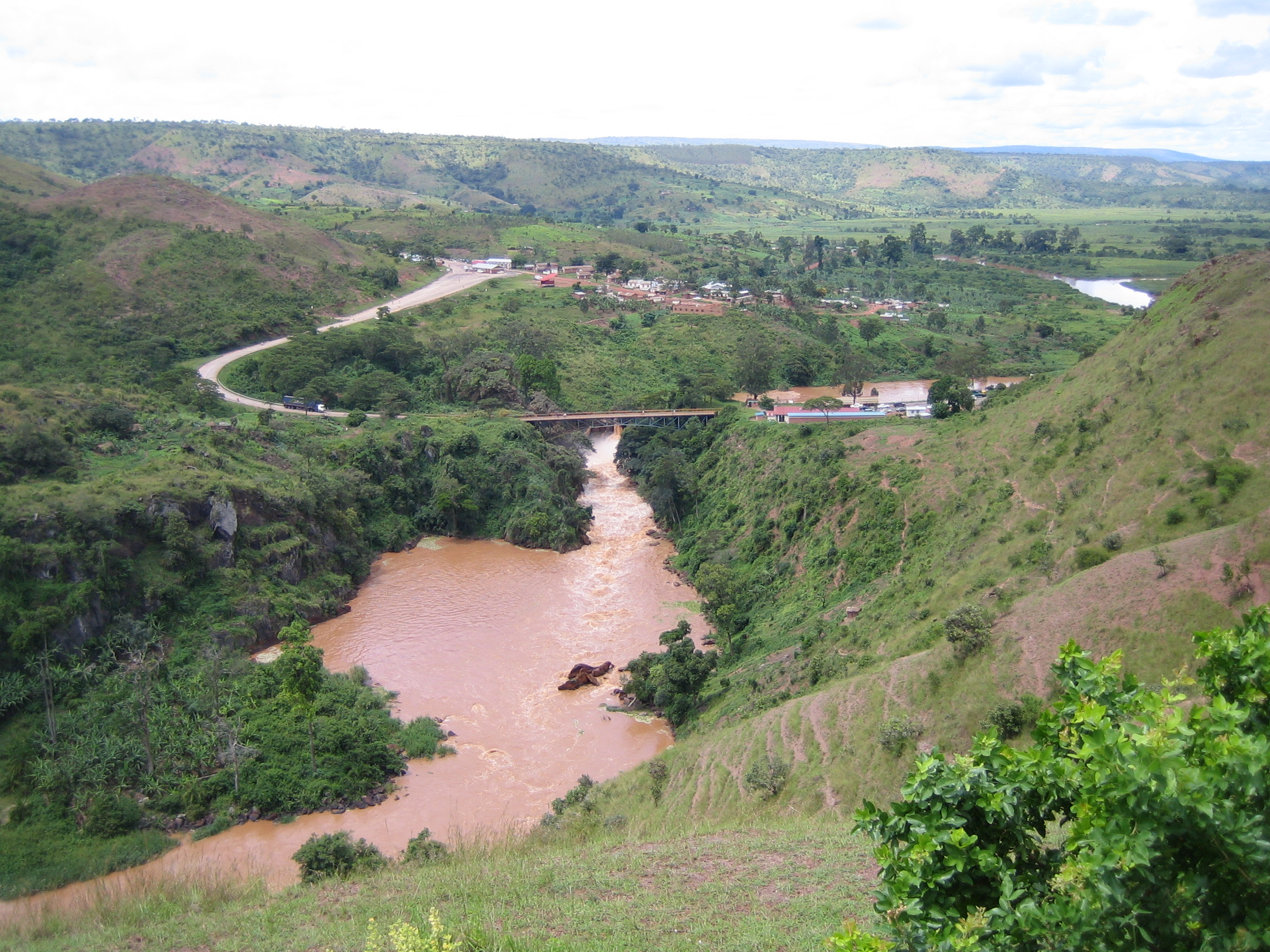
- The border crossing at Rusumo Falls. Tanzania is on the left, Rwanda on the right.

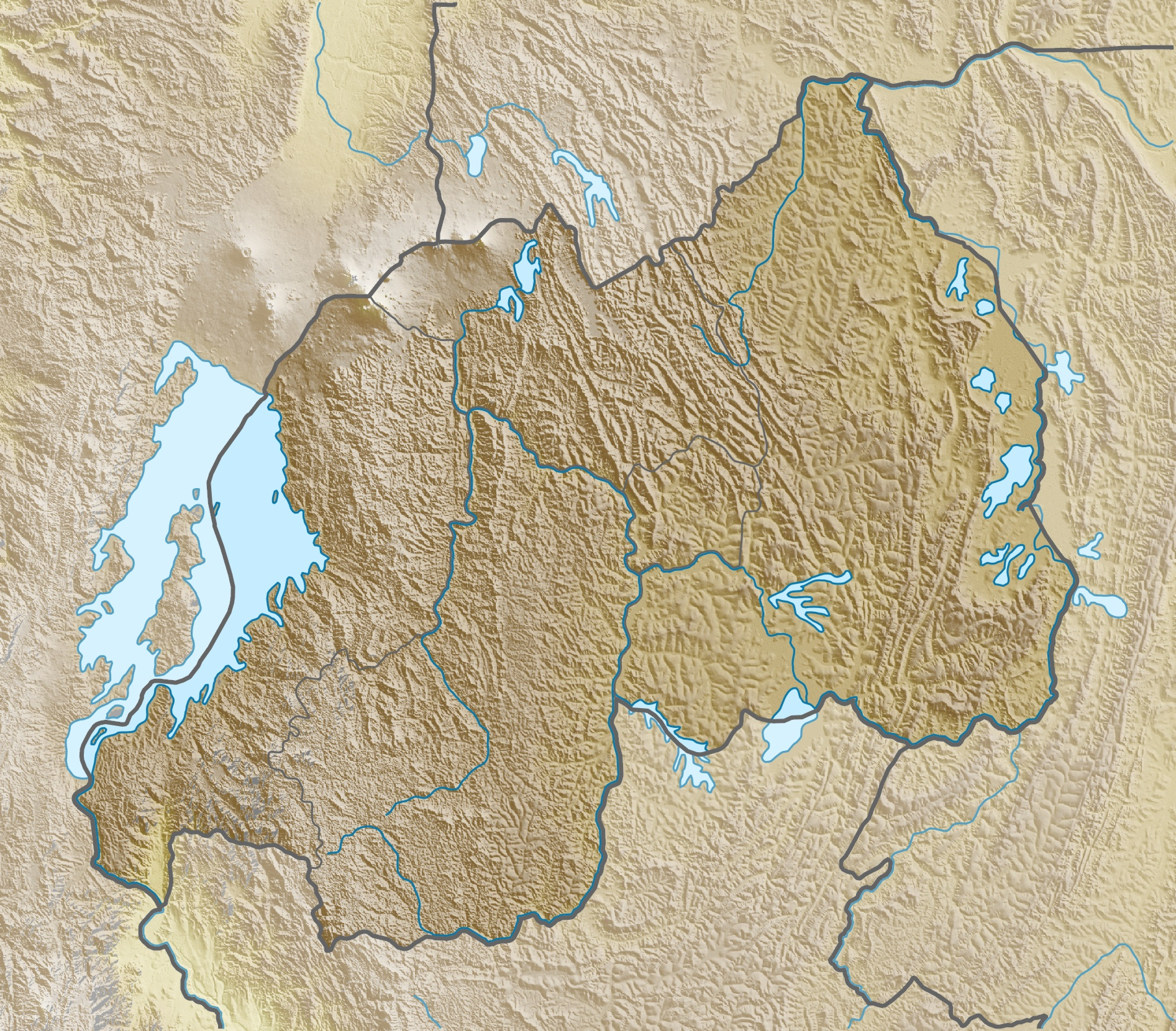
- Location within Rwanda
- Location: Rwanda-Tanzania border
- Coordinates: 2°22′31″S 30°47′33″E
- Total height: 15 m (49 ft)
- Total width: 40 m (130 ft)
- Watercourse: Nile

Rusumo Falls (French: Chutes Rusumo) is a waterfall located on the Kagera river on the border between Rwanda and Tanzania, part of the most distant headwaters of the river Nile. The falls are approximately 15 m (49 ft) high and 40 m (130 ft) wide and have formed on Precambrian schists and quartz–phyllites.

Although the falls themselves are not of significant height in comparison to other waterfalls, they have played an important part in the history of Rwanda because they form the only bridging point on the river in that area.

== In history ==
The falls were the scene of the first arrival of Europeans in Rwanda in 1894, when the German count Gustav Adolf von Götzen came across from Tanzania (Rwanda had been considered part of German East Africa since 1885 but no German had yet entered the country). He continued from there to the palace of the Mwami at Nyanza, and onward to the shores of Lake Kivu.

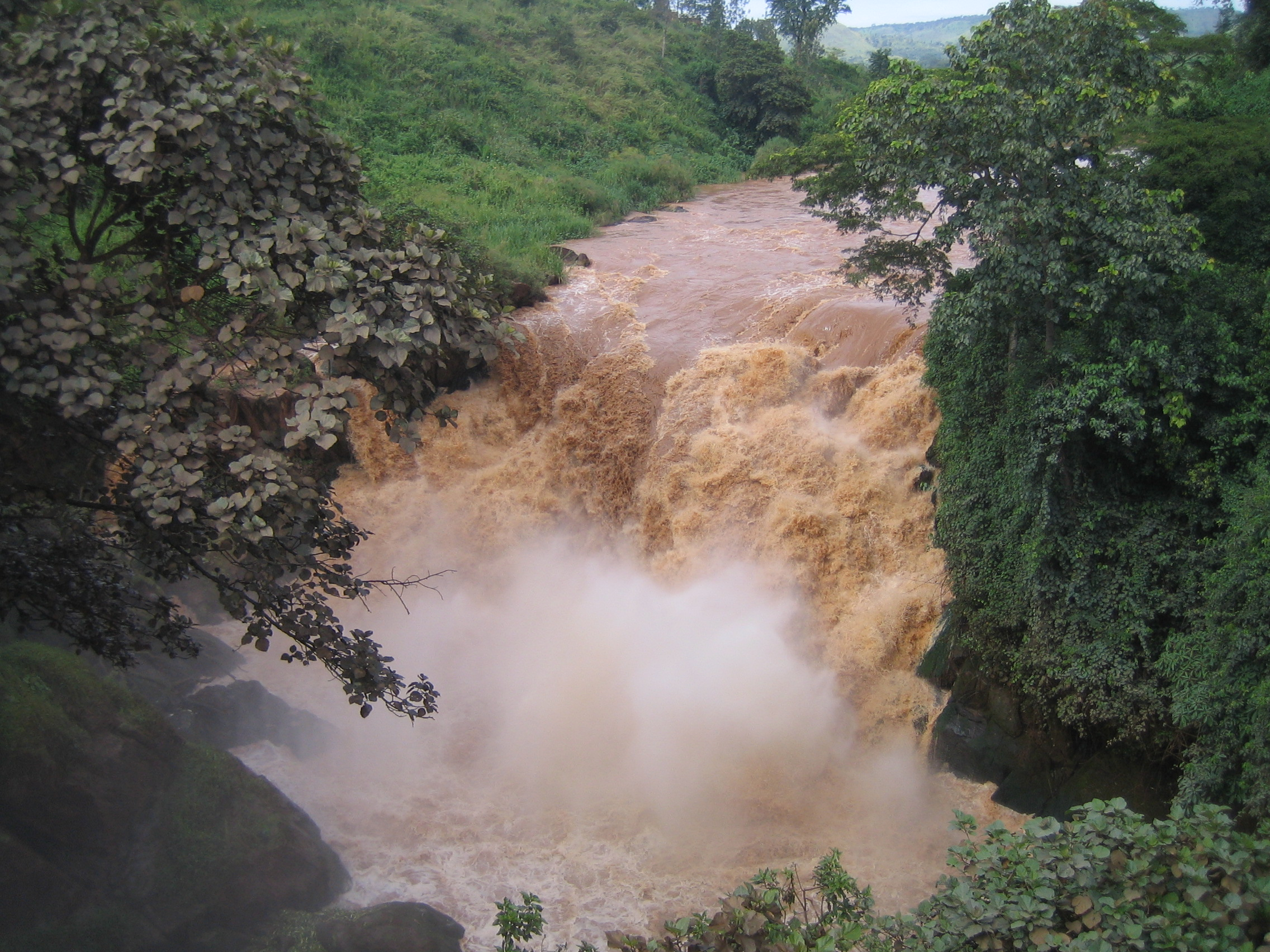
A close up of the falls.

The Belgians also entered Rwanda via the falls, when they took over the country during World War I in 1916. The bridge at Rusumo was the only feasible crossing of the river at the time, and the Germans had entrenched themselves on the Rwandan side. By taking up positions in the surrounding hills, the Belgians were able to remove these guards using mounted artillery opening up the route by which they invaded the rest of the country.

The falls gained international fame during the 1994 Rwandan genocide, as thousands of bodies flowed underneath the Rusumo Bridge while a simultaneous stream of refugees crossed over it, fleeing into Tanzania to escape the slaughter. This was one of the first mass outflows of the Great Lakes refugee crisis. The Kagera drains water from all areas of Rwanda except the far west, and consequently carried all the corpses which had been discarded into rivers nationwide. This led to a state of emergency being declared in areas around the shore of Lake Victoria in Uganda, where these bodies eventually washed up.

In 2024 the African Development Bank Group approved funding for the Regional Rusumo Falls Hydropower Project which will increase renewable power generating capacity and access to electricity in Tanzania, Rwanda and Burundi. The project has two components: an 80 MW hydropower generation plant and transmission lines and substations. The Bank finances the transmission facilities of Rusumo Falls Hydropower Project.

== See also ==
- List of waterfalls
