= Nyabarongo River =

River in Rwanda

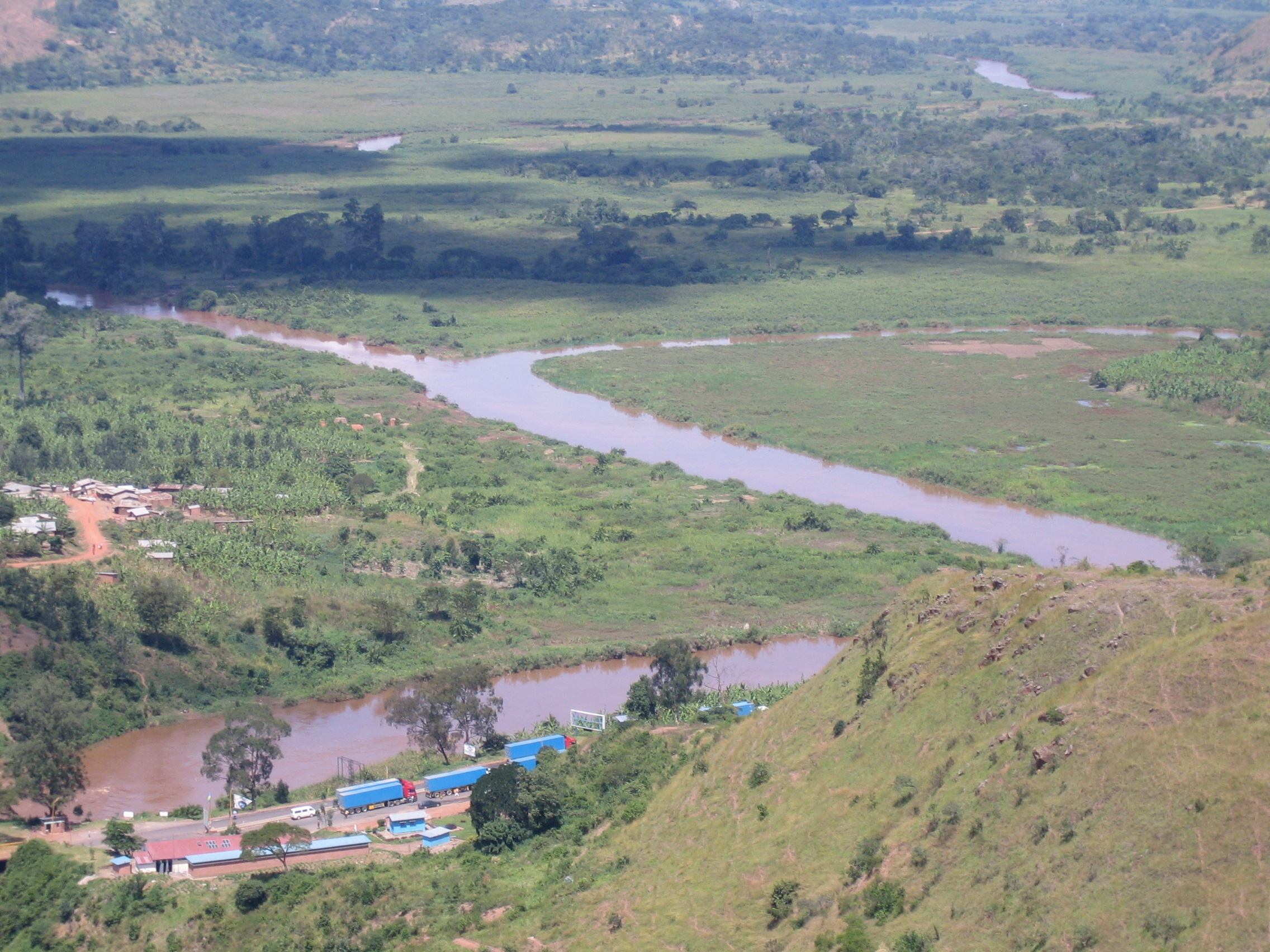
- The confluence of the Nyawarungu (top right) and the Ruvubu (top left) to form the Akagera River (foreground).

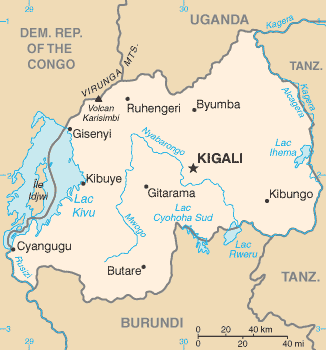
- Map of Rwanda, showing location of Nyabarongo River, which flows first north, then southeast past Kigali, then east along the southeastern border of Rwanda

Location
- Country: Rwanda, Burundi, Tanzania

Physical characteristics
- Source
  - coordinates: 2.203503°S 29.567728°E
  - elevation: 1,537 m (5,043 ft)
- Mouth
  - coordinates: 2.390024°S 30.780387°E
  - elevation: 1,323 m (4,341 ft)
- Length: 351 km (218 mi)

Basin features
- Tributaries
  - left: Nyabugogo River
  - right: Akanyaru River, Ruvuvu River

The Nyabarongo(or Nyawarungu) is a major river in Rwanda, part of the upper headwaters of the Nile. With a total length of 351 km (218 mi), it is the longest river entirely in Rwanda. It is extended 421 km (262 mi) in Lake Rweru including a 69 km (43 mi) upper course of Kagera River before joining into Ruvuvu River to form the Kagera River. The river begins its course at the confluence of the rivers Mbirurume and Mwogo in the South West of the country. These two rivers themselves begin in Nyungwe Forest, and are considered by some to be the most distant source of the Nile. From its start, Nyabarongo flows northward for 85 km (53 miles), and forms the border between the Western and Southern Provinces. At the confluence with the river Mukungwa, the river changes course and flows eastward for 12 km (7.5 miles), then to a more South Eastern course for the last 200 km (124 miles). For the longest stretch of this course, the river serves as the boundary between the Northern and Southern Provinces, then between the City of Kigali and the Southern Province, and lastly between the City of Kigali and the Eastern Province.

The river then before enters the Eastern Province and ends its course close to the border with Burundi. The Nyabarongo River empties both into Lake Rweru and the Kagera (or Akagera) river in a small but complicated delta. The Kagera river outflows from Lake Rweru, a mere 1 km from the Nyabarongo delta. Almost all the branches of the Nyabarongo delta empty in the lake, however, one branch of the delta empties directly in the just formed Kagera river. The Kagera River eventually flows into Lake Victoria and forms the Nile.

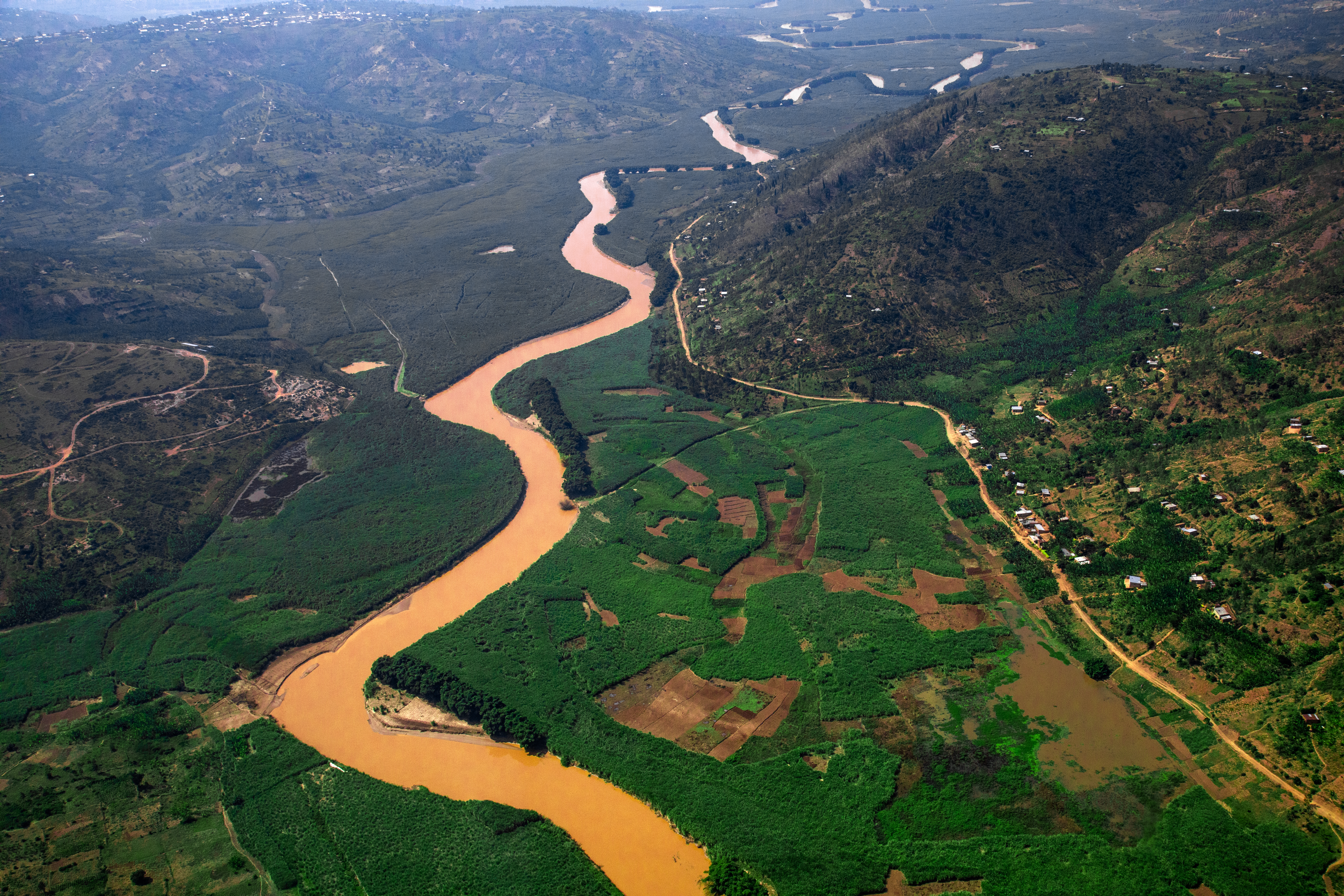
An aerial of Nyabarongo River from Nyungwe National Park to River Nile. Emmanuel Kwizera

== Origins ==
The Nyabarongo River originates in southwestern Rwanda to the east of Lake Kivu. The river's sources rise in the mountain chain that covers most of the western third of Rwanda, to the east of the Albertine Rift. The main headwaters in the forested mountain country, originating at heights of 2,600 to 2,750 metres (8,530 to 9,020 ft) above sea level, are the Mbirurume and Mwogo rivers. The longest of the streams that supply the Mwogo is the Rukarara, which rises in the Nyungwe Forest. The Rukarara flows south and then east, emptying into the Mwogo River. The Mwogo flows north, merging with the Mbirurume River south of Bwakira. From this confluence, the river assumes the name Nyabarongo. The source of the Rukarara is a contender for the overall source of the Nile, the most distant headwater.

== Course ==
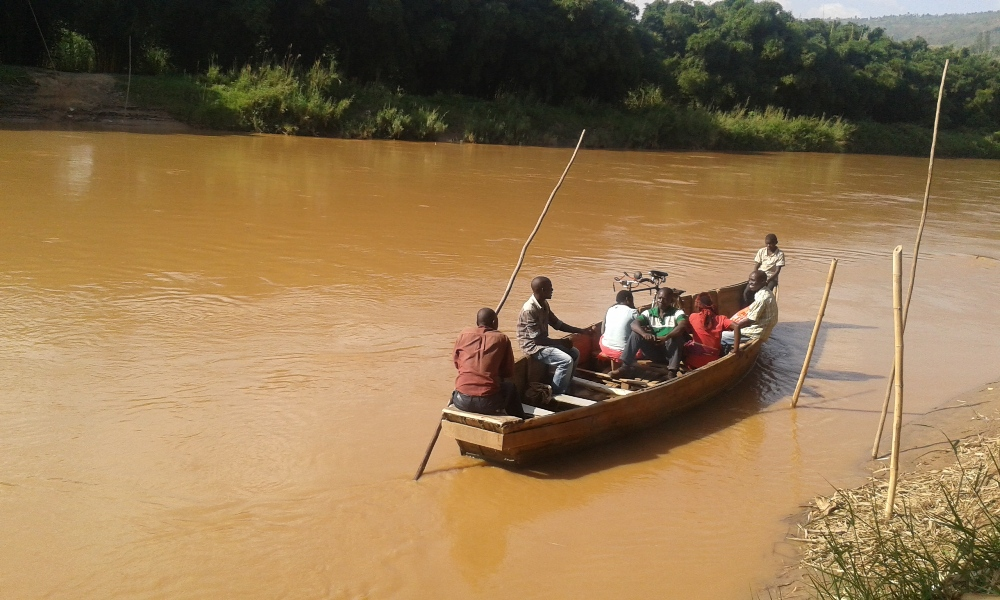
Canoeing on the Nyabarongo

The Nyawarungu runs northward through the mountain chain in a deep valley roughly parallel to Lake Kivu and about the same elevation of about 1,500 metres (4,900 ft). At Muramba it swings to the southeast. On its left bank the Nyabugogo River delivers the outflow from Lake Muhazi. Around Kigali the river is used for cooking, drinking and bathing. It also receives sewage and waste from industry and agriculture. About 35 kilometres (22 mi) further downstream the Akanyaru river enters on its right bank, to the southwest of Kigali.

The combined river flows east and then southeast through a broad, swampy valley. At the border with Burundi it drains Lake Rweru. It then flows roughly east along the border between Rwanda and Burundi, then between Rwanda and Tanzania, to the point where it is joined by the Ruvuvu River. From there onward it is called the Kagera River, the main affluent of Lake Victoria, which drains into the Nile. The river drains the east of the mountains and most of the central plateau of Rwanda.

== Wetlands ==
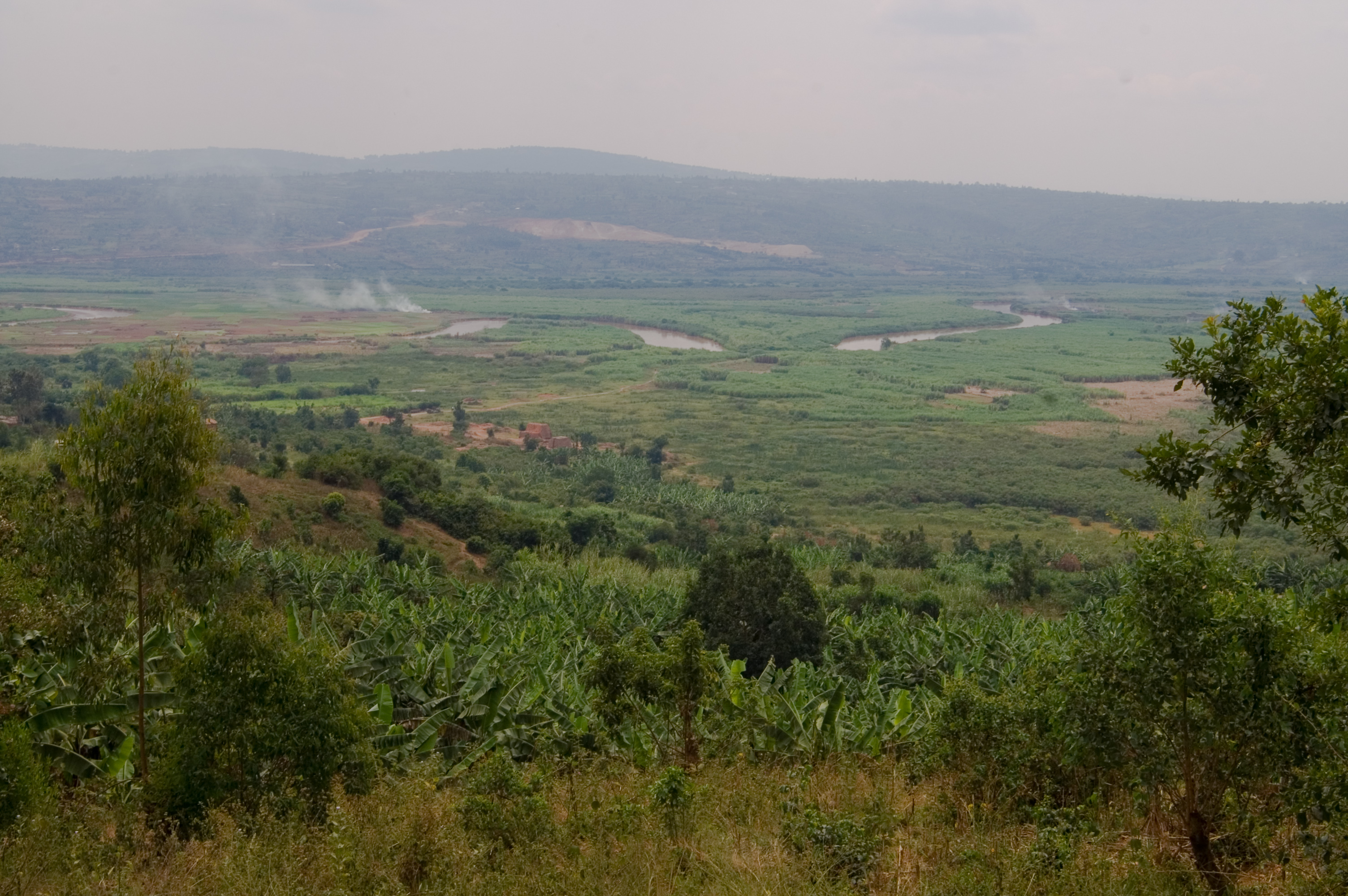
The Nyabarongo River in Rwanda

Soon after being joined by the Akanyaru, the combined river meanders east and then south through a complex of lakes and wetlands in a flat valley running in a SSE direction, 35 kilometres (22 mi) wide, which it floods to create a zone of permanent swamps and lakes. Lake Mugesera lies on the east bank of the river, and is the largest Rwandan lake in the complex. Lakes Birara and Sake also lie along the left bank of the river. The lakes on the right bank, from north to south, are Gashanga, Kidogo, Rumira, Maravi, Kilimbi, Gaharwa, Rweru and Kanzigiri. Lake Rweru, which mostly lies in Burundi, drains in a northeast direction into the river through a short swampy section.

Although close to the equator, the climate is comparatively temperate due to the elevation. The rainy seasons are from March to May and again from September to December. In the upper reaches of the wetlands the forest is only flooded seasonally. Further down, common plants are Ficus verruculosa, Myrica kandtiana, Phoenix reclinata and Cyperus papyrus. The water is generally around 25 °C (77 °F). Fish are abundant, and there are many species of waterbirds. Other animals include water turtles, crocodiles, monitors, snakes and otters.

The Nyabarongo River Wetlands is an unprotected area surrounding the course of the Nyabarongo, and covering 142.62 square kilometres (55.07 sq mi). It is of great importance for biodiversity conservation, especially birds, with species such as the endangered Malagasy pond heron (Ardeola idae), the near-threatened papyrus gonolek (Laniarius mufumbiri), the vulnerable grey crowned crane (Balearica regulorum), and the sitatunga (Tragelaphus spekii). The wetlands are under serious pressure from agriculture.

The following species in the Nyabarongo River Wetlands are red-listed as endangered: papyrus gonolek (Laniarius mufumbiri), Carruthers's cisticola (Cisticola carruthersi), white-winged scrub-warbler (Bradypterus carpalis), papyrus yellow warbler (Chloropeta gracilirostris), Sharpe's pied-babbler (Turdoides sharpei), northern brown-throated weaver (Ploceus castanops), white-collared oliveback (Nesocharis ansorgei), and papyrus canary (Serinus koliensis).
