= Bwakira, Rwanda =

Bwakira
- Location within Rwanda
- Coordinates: 2.18592°S 29.55451°E
- Country: Rwanda

Bwakira is a former commune in western Rwanda. The main town was Birambo. In 1991 the population density was 343 people per square kilometer. During the Rwandan genocide the mayor (burgomaster) of Bwakira ordered mass killings and mass graves to be dug at Birambo.
