= Congo-Nile Divide (Rwanda-Burundi) =

Geographical region in Rwanda and Burundi

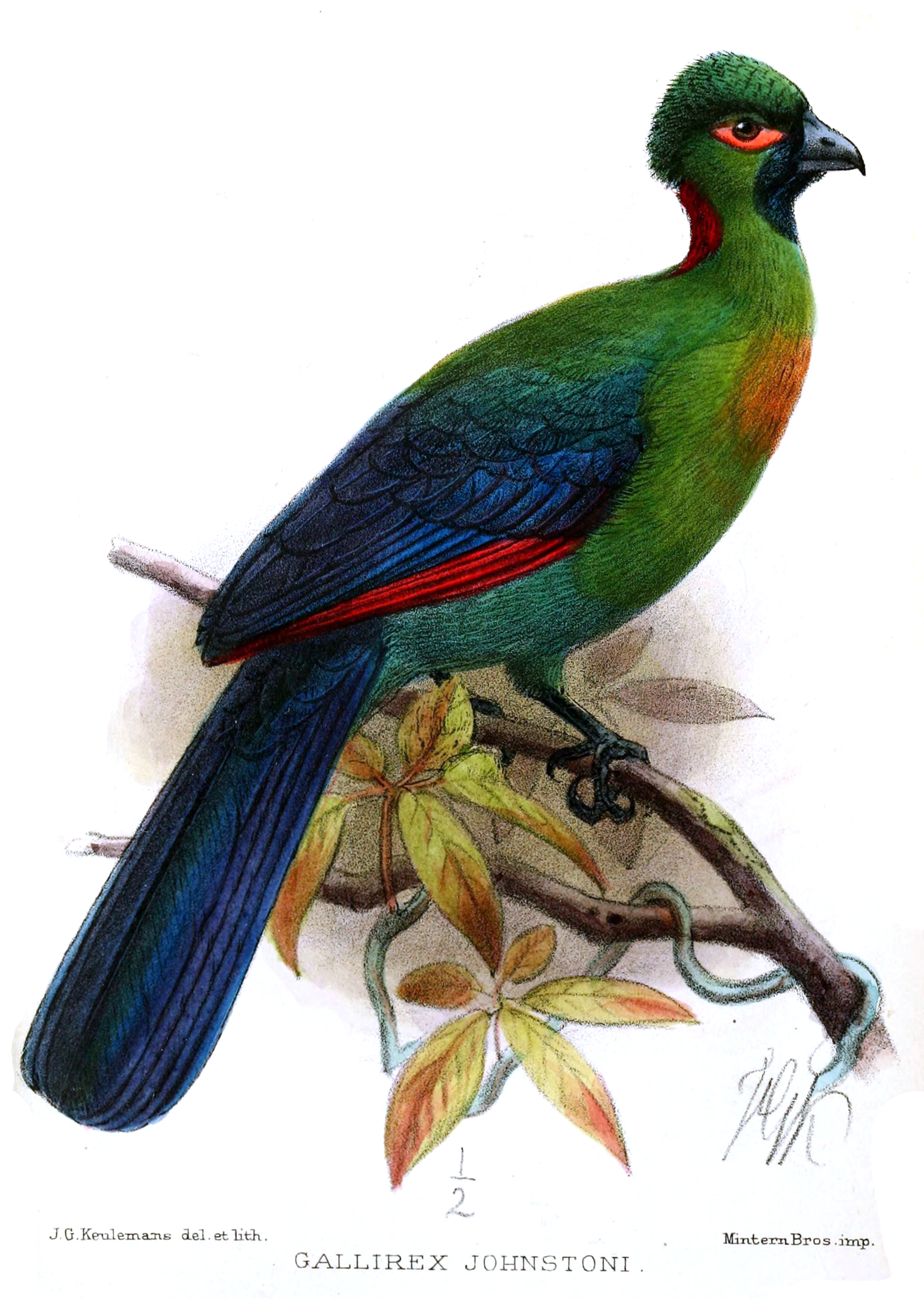
Rwenzori turaco

The Congo-Nile Divide region of Rwanda and Burundi is a mountainous area in the southern section of the Congo-Nile Divide, to the east of the Albertine Rift. The region includes the Nyungwe and Kibira national parks. The Bugoyi people live in the region.

== Geography ==
The region of the divide is mountainous, with some peaks over 10,000 feet (3,000 m) high. Lake Kivu lies to the west of the mountains. The east of the divide slopes down to the central plateau of Rwanda, with elevations of 5,000 to 6,000 feet (1,500 to 1,800 m).

The Congo-Nile Divide Trail runs through the area, ending on the Butare-Cyangugu road, about 7 kilometres (4.3 mi) west of Uwinka. The Congo-Nile Divide Trail is 42.2 kilometres (26.2 mi) long. Created in 2007, it runs along a ridge that forms part of the divide.

== Flora and fauna ==
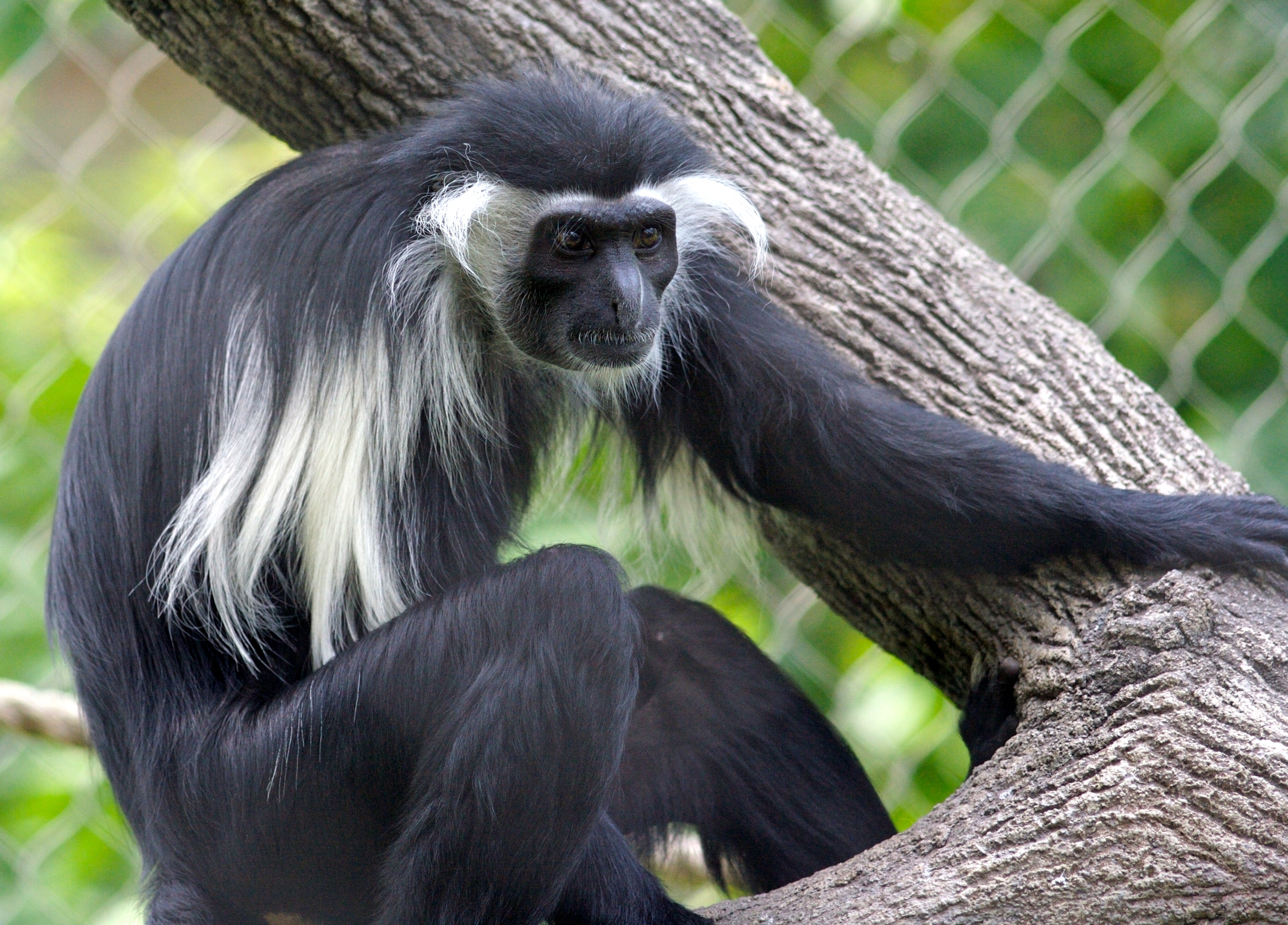
Ruwenzori colobus

There are bracken fields, sedge marshes and open fields, and primary, secondary and bamboo forests. Flora include ericaceous shrub and wildflowers. A total of 1,344 plant species have been recorded, including 187 endemic species and 18 species in the threatened category (CR, EN, and VU under the IUCN Red List (2010)).

123 mammal species are reported from the region, of which 19 are endemic and 14 are threatened. There has been large loss of animal species through poaching and hunting for bushmeat. Buffalo and elephants have been extirpated in the area. Chimpanzee, mountain monkey, owl-faced monkey, and more than 400 Angolan colobus have also been reported.

Reptiles are also reported to consist of 43 species, including 11 endemic species. The Divide is also a rich bird area with as many as 367 species reported, with 29 of them being endemic, and with seven species in the threatened category; some of the species of note are the Rwenzori turaco, red-collared mountain babbler and Kivu ground thrush.
