= Kagera River =

River in East Africa

Kagera Akagera
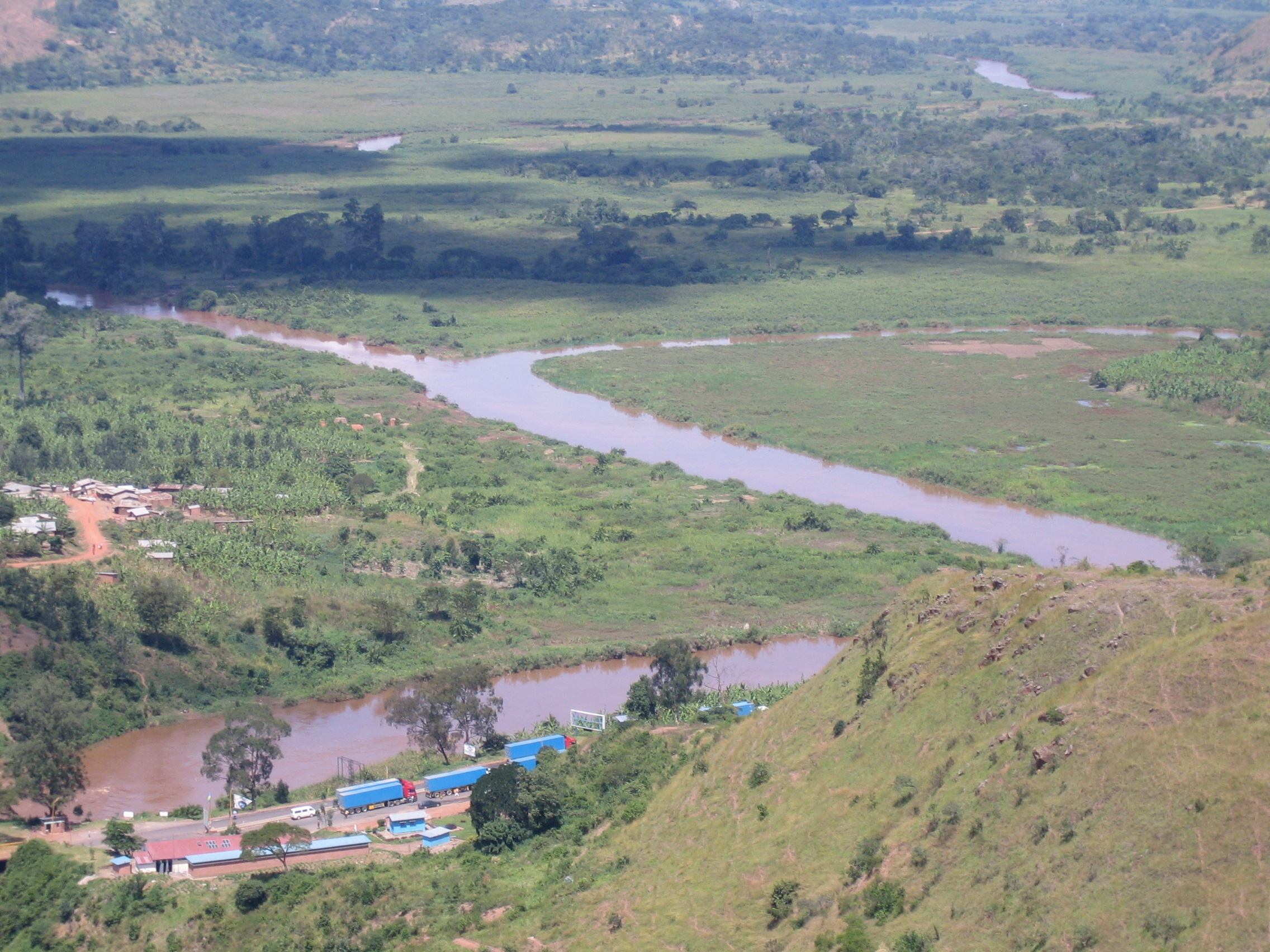
- The confluence of the Kagera and Ruvubu rivers near Rusumo Falls, Rwanda/Tanzania.

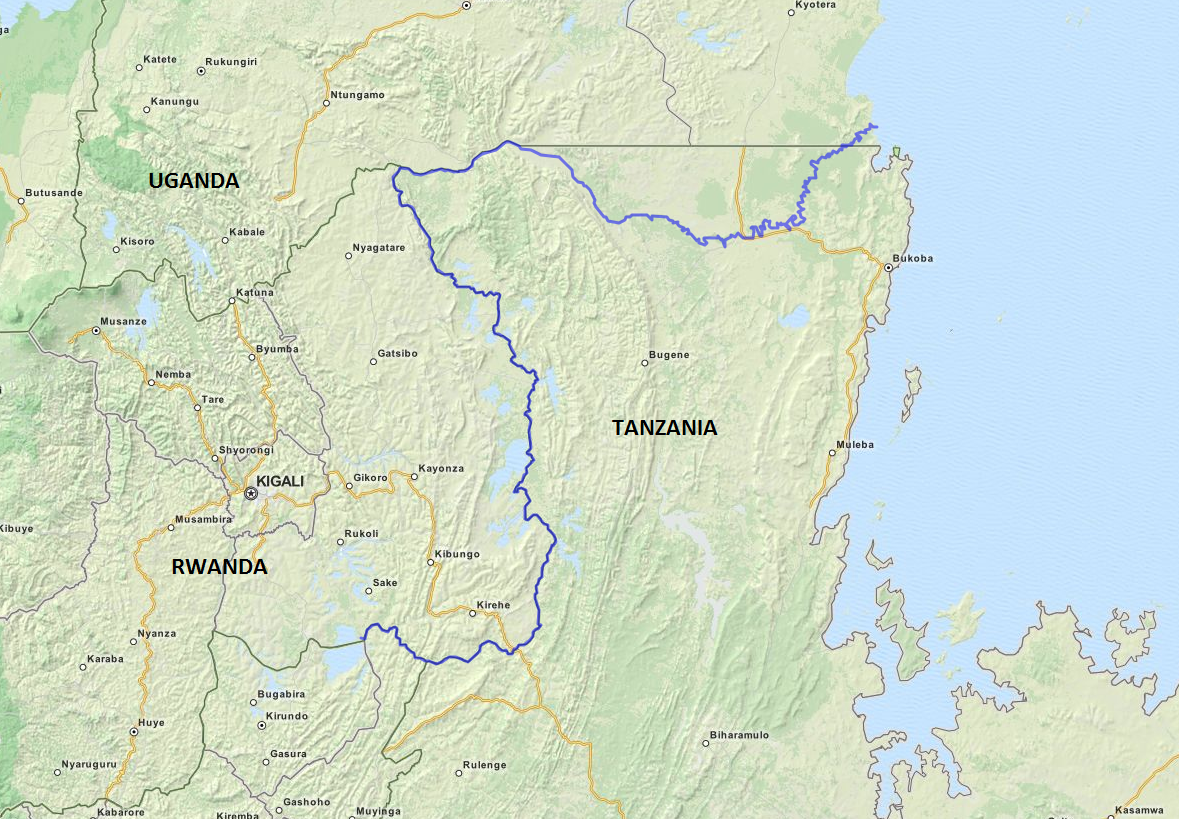
- Map of the Kagera River flowing into Lake Victoria.

Location
- Countries: Burundi, Rwanda, Tanzania, Uganda

Physical characteristics
- Source: Rukarara River
  - location: Nyamagabe District
  - coordinates: 2.282212°S 29.331242°E
  - elevation: 2,408 m (7,900 ft)
- Source confluence: Lake Rweru
  - location: Eastern Province, Rwanda
  - coordinates: 2°21′18″S 30°22′22″E
  - elevation: 1,324 m (4,344 ft)
- Mouth: Lake Victoria
  - location: Kyotera District
  - coordinates: 0°56′41″S 31°46′36″E
  - elevation: 1,134 m (3,720 ft)
- Length: 597 km (371 mi)
- Basin size: 58,578.9 km^{2} (22,617.4 mi^{2}) 59,700 km^{2} (23,100 mi^{2})
- Discharge
  - location: Near mouth
  - average: (Period: 1971–2000)346 m^{3}/s (12,200 cu ft/s) 184 m^{3}/s (6,500 cu ft/s)
  - maximum: 540 m^{3}/s (19,000 cu ft/s)

Basin features
- Progression: Lake Victoria → Victoria Nile → White Nile → Nile → Mediterranean Sea
- Tributaries
  - left: Nyabarongo
  - right: Ruvubu
- Waterfalls: Rusumo Falls

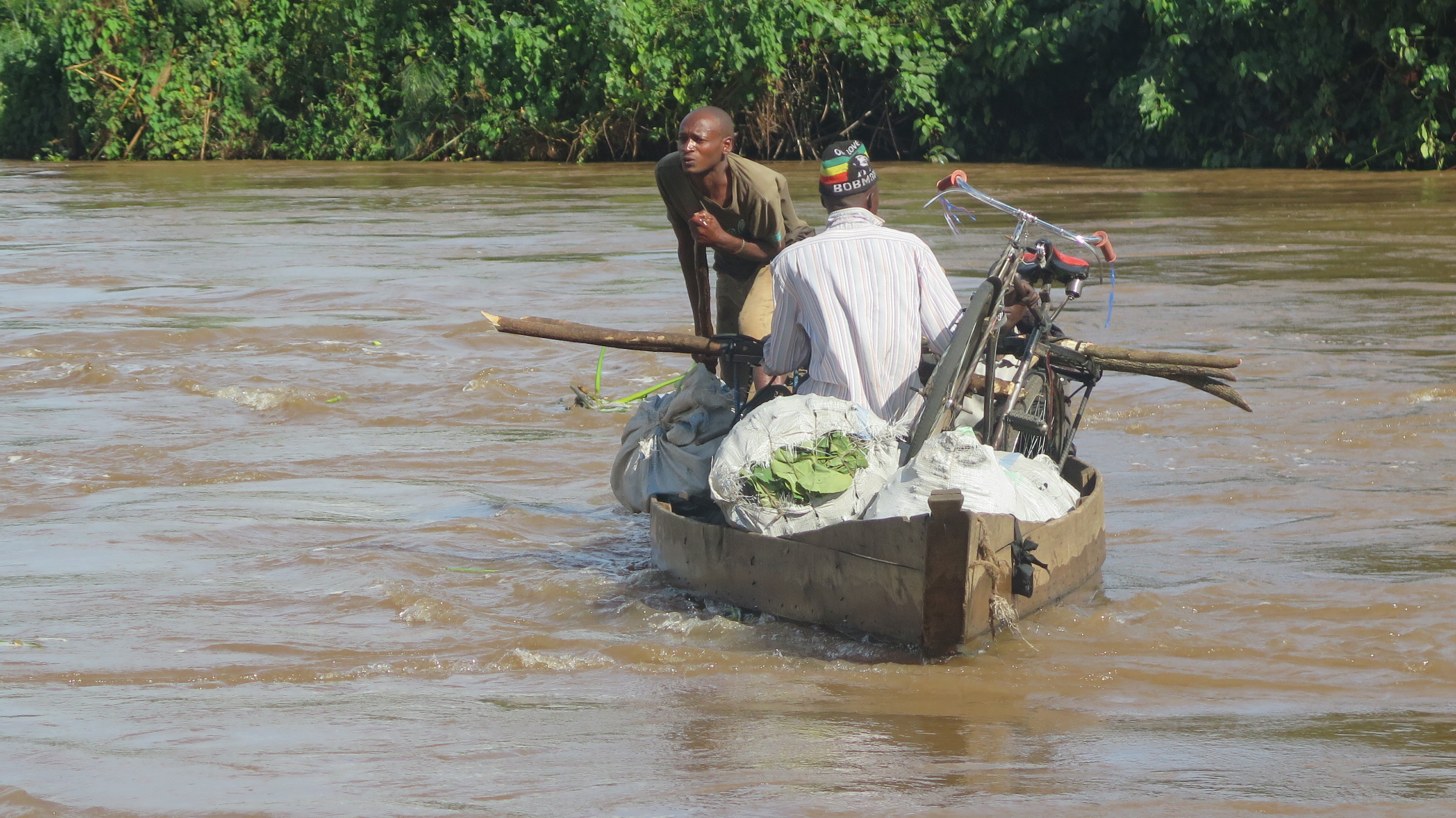
Informal Cross-border Trade - River Kagera.

The Kagera River, also known as Akagera River, or Alexandra Nile, is an East African river, forming part of the upper headwaters of the Nile and carrying water from its most distant source. With a total length of 597 km (371 mi) from its source located in Lake Rweru in Rwanda.

The section of river named Kagera begins in Burundi, flowing out from Lake Rweru. From the lake, it flows east along the Rwanda-Burundi and Rwanda-Tanzania borders to a confluence with the Ruvubu River. The waters of the Kagera are thus provided by two major tributaries, the Nyabarongo of Rwanda, which feeds Lake Rweru, and the Ruvubu of Burundi. It is unknown which of these two feeder rivers is the longer and hence the ultimate source of the Nile. From the confluence, the Kagera flows north along the Rwanda-Tanzania border, over Rusumo Falls and through Akagera National Park. It then takes a turn to the east, following the Tanzania-Uganda border and emptying into Lake Victoria in Uganda. In 1898, Richard Kandt was the first European to reach the source of the Kagera.

The river has featured prominently in the histories of the countries it runs through, particularly Rwanda. In 1894, German Gustav Adolf von Götzen crossed the Kagera at Rusumo Falls, marking the Rwandan colonial era that officially started in 1899. And in 1916, during World War I, the Belgians defeated the Germans, entering Rwanda by the same route. The river gained international notoriety in 1994 for carrying bodies from the Rwandan genocide into Lake Victoria, causing a state of emergency to be declared in areas of Uganda, where these bodies eventually washed up.

== Geography ==
The Kagera rises in Burundi and flows into Lake Victoria. It is the largest single inflow into the lake, contributing approximately 6.4 billion cubic metres of water a year (about 28 per cent of the lake's outflow). The Kagera is formed by the confluence of the Ruvubu and the Nyabarongo, close to the northernmost point of Lake Tanganyika. It forms parts of the Burundi–Tanzania, Rwanda–Tanzania, Burundi–Rwanda, and Tanzania–Uganda borders. It lends its name to Akagera National Park in northern Rwanda, as well as to the Kagera Region of Tanzania. On the river are the Rusumo Falls, an important crossing point between Rwanda and Tanzania. It is near the town of Rusumo.

== Fish ==
The Kagera River basin is rich in fish. As of 2001, there were at least 55 species known from the Rwandan section alone and the actual number is likely higher. Seven additional species have been documented in other surveys. Additionally, there are at least 15 undescribed species of haplochromine cichlids that are endemic to some of the lakes in the upper parts of the river basin. Because of the many waterfalls and rapids, the various sections of the Kagera River basin are clearly separated, making movements by fish between them difficult or even impossible.

One species known to have inhabited the basin, namely Labeobarbus microbarbis, is now considered extinct.

== Genocide ==
During the Rwandan genocide of 1994, the Kagera was used to dispose of corpses as thousands of Tutsis and Hutu political moderates were murdered on the river banks. The river brought the massacred bodies into Lake Victoria, creating a serious health hazard in Uganda.

== See also ==
- Ruvubu River - Right tributary of the river
- Nyabarongo River - Left tributary of the river
