= Gatsata =

- Sector
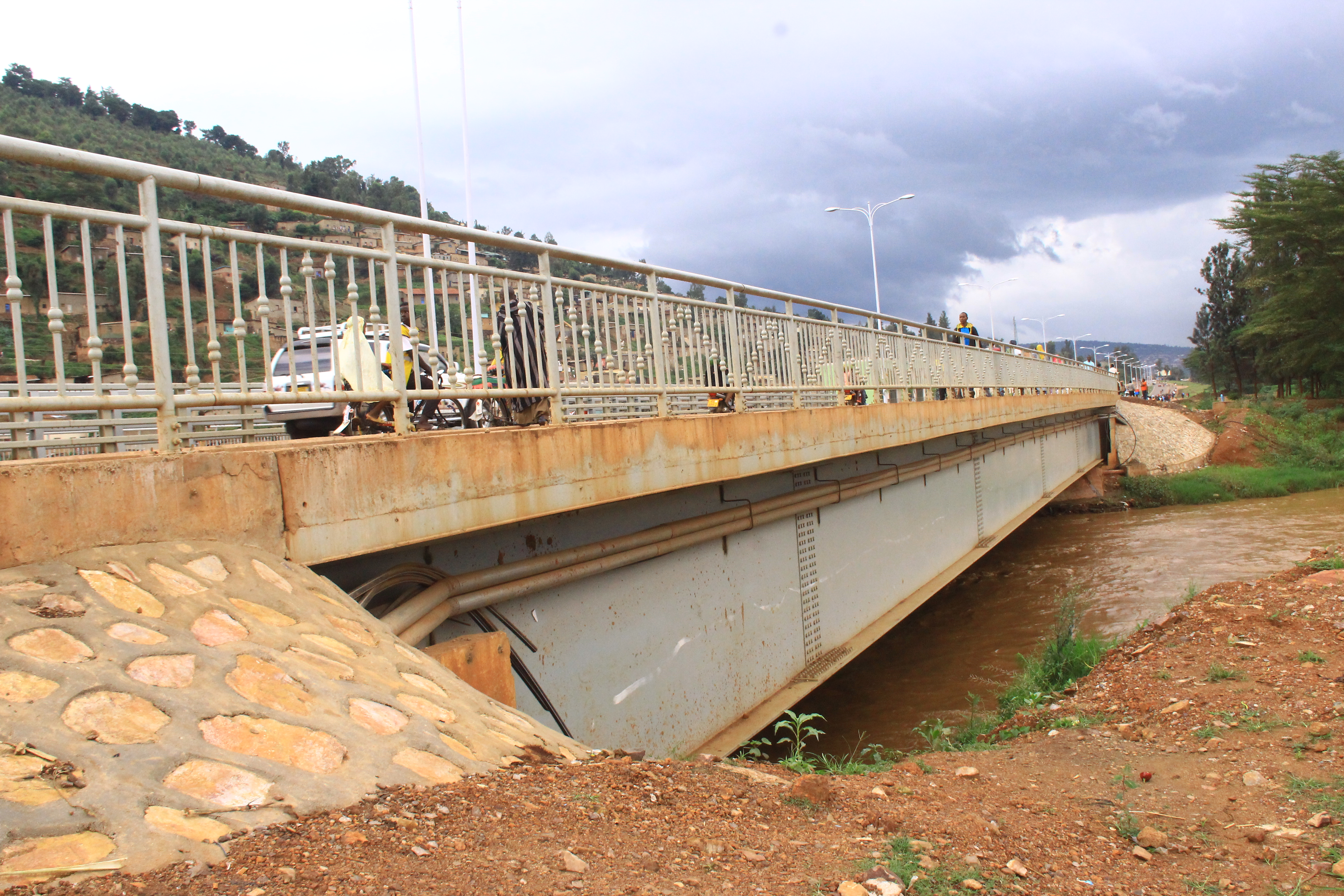
- Bridge on National Road 3 over the Nyabugogo River in the south of the sector, on the border with Kimisagara
- Interactive map of Gatsata
- Coordinates: 1.9220°S 30.0423°E
- Country: Rwanda
- Province: Kigali
- District: Gasabo District

Area
  - Total: 6.022 km^{2} (2.325 sq mi)

Population (2022 census)
  - Total: 46,262
  - Density: 7,682/km^{2} (19,900/sq mi)
- Time zone: UTC+2 (CAT)

Gatsata (Kinyarwanda: Umurenge wa Gatsata) is one of the 15 sectors of Gasabo District in the city of Kigali, Rwanda.

== Geography ==
Gatsata covers an area of 6.0 km². The sector is divided into three cells: Karuruma in the north, Nyamabuye in the south and Nyamugari between them. Its administrative seat is located in Karuruma. Neighbouring sectors are Jabana to the northeast, Gisozi to the east, Muhima to the southeast, Kimisagara and Kigali to the south, Kanyinya to the southwest and Jali to the west. The eastern boundary of the sector is formed by the Nyabugogo River and the surrounding 131-hectare Nyabugogo Wetland. The river flows southwest and empties into the Nyabarongo River at the border of the sectors of Kanyinya, Kigali and Runda. Increasing deforestation, including on nearby Mount Jali, has contributed to erosion and a higher flood risk in the lower-lying sector of Gatsata along the Nyabugogo River.

== Population ==
According to the 2022 census, Gatsata had a population of 46,262. Ten years earlier, its population was 37,110, corresponding to an average annual population increase of 2.2 percent between 2012 and 2022.

== Culture ==
A memorial in Gatsata commemorates the genocide against the Tutsi in 1994. It honours 513 victims among the more than 800,000 people killed.

== Economy and transport ==
The sector has numerous vehicle repair garages. Because of insufficient waste-disposal systems, environmentally harmful waste, including oil and heavy metals such as chromium, cadmium and lead, enters the nearby Nyabugogo River and the surrounding wetland.

National Road 3 runs roughly north–south through the eastern part of the sector, parallel to the Nyabugogo River.
