= Kanyinya (Rwanda) =

Sector in the City of Kigali, Rwanda

- Location in Rwanda
- Coordinates: 1°54′57″S 30°0′21″E
- Country: Rwanda
- Provinces: City of Kigali
- Districts: Nyarugenge

Area
  - Total: 24.17 km^{2} (9.33 sq mi)
- Elevation: 1,727 m (5,666 ft)

Population
  - Total: 31,026
  - Density: 1,283/km^{2} (3,320/sq mi)
- Time zone: UTC+2

Kanyinya is a sector (umurenge) in the Nyarugenge District of Kigali, Rwanda. It is located in the northwest part of the city of Kigali. The sector used to be part of the Shyorongi Commune before local government changes following the Rwandan genocide.

== Geography ==
Its western border is shaped by the Nyabarongo River. To its south is the Nyabugogo River, which is a tributary of Nyabarongo. To its east is the Yanzi River which is a tributary of Nyabugogo. It has an elevation of 1727 meters, which makes it the highest sector in Nyarugenge by listed elevation. It has an area of 24.17km.

== Demographics ==
In 2012, Its population was 21,859 inhabitants, and had a gender ratio of 10,777 males to 11,082 females.

According to the 2022 census, the sector had a total population of 31,026 inhabitants. These are its Gender demographics:

- Males 15,776
- Females 15,250

As of 2022 it had a 46.5% Urban rate, 53.5% rural rate. and a It is quite young with 37.5% of the population being under 15 and 60.4% of the population being younger than 65 and older than 15. Only 2.1% of the population is older than 64. It has an annual population rate of 3.6%.

== Sports ==
It is home to the Skol Stadium which was built by and named after Skol Brewery. It was finished on December 13, 2022, and costed Skol Rwanda RWF500 million, which is around 343 thousand U.S. dollars. The stadium, as of 2022, is the training base for Rayon Sports for both the men's and women's teams. The Skol Beer Brewery is near the northern side of the stadium.

== Architecture ==
In 2021, the Kanyinya Canopy Walkway was built, which crosses the Yanzi River and connects the Kanyinya and Jali Sectors. The walkway is a suspension bridge, and cost Rwf133 million, which is around 91,000 in U.S. dollars. The sector has two kingdoms hall of Jehovah's Witnesses, both on the north and south sides.

== Transportation ==
The NR2 runs through the sector from north to south. The NR1 runs just south of its southern border.

== Sectors ==
Nyarugenge District is divided into 10 sectors (imirenge): Gitega, Kanyinya, Kigali, Kimisagara, Mageragere, Muhima, Nyakabanda, Nyamirambo, Nyarugenge and Rwezamenyo.

== Cells ==
The sector is divided into the following cells: Nzove, Taba, and Nyamweru.

== Education ==
The schools in the Kanyinya sector are: Groupe Scolaire Kanyinya, EP Nyamweru, and the Bibungo Primary School.
