= Kimisagara =

Sector in the City of Kigali, Rwanda

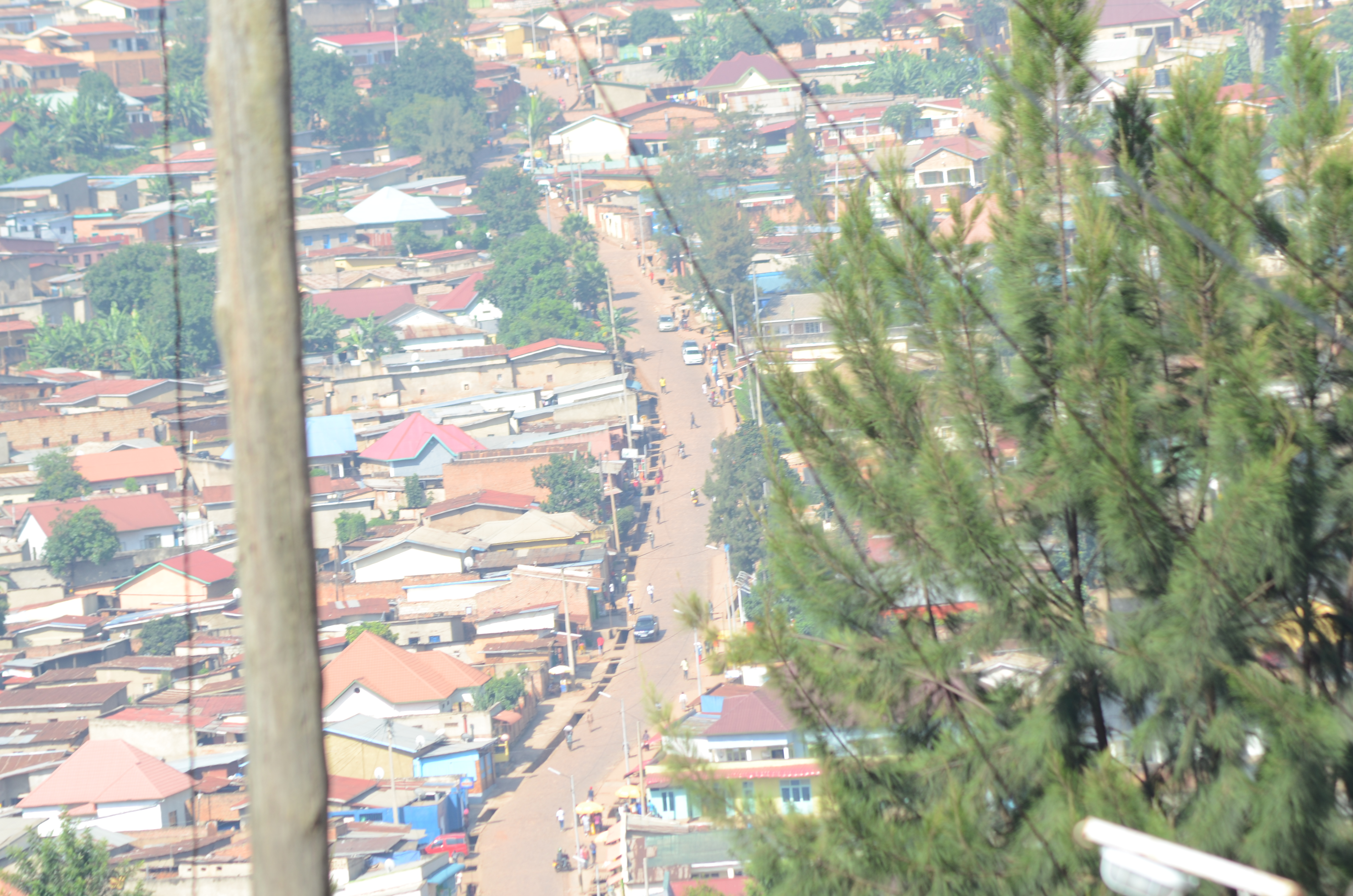
- Coordinates: 1°57′9″S 30°2′25″E
- Country: Rwanda
- Provinces: City of Kigali
- Districts: Nyarugenge

Area
  - Total: 3.313 km^{2} (1.279 sq mi)
- Elevation: 1,484 m (4,869 ft)

Population
  - Total: 56,534
  - Density: 17,065/km^{2} (44,200/sq mi)
- Time zone: UTC+2

Kimisagara is a sector (umurenge) in the Nyarugenge District of Kigali, Rwanda. It is located in the southwest part of the city of Kigali.

== Geography ==
Its northern border is shaped by the Nyabugogo River, a tributary of the Nyabarongo River, and the western border is shaped by an unnamed tributary of Nyabugogo. Southwest of the sector is Mount Kigali and the Mount Kigali Forest. The elevation is 1484 meters.

== Demographics ==
In 2012, Its population was 46,753 inhabitants, and had a gender ratio of 24,451 males to 22,302 females.

According to the 2022 census, the sector had a total population of 56,534 inhabitants. These are its Gender demographics:

- Males 28,905
- Females 27,629

The Rwanda Environment Management Authority hypothesised that the high male-to-female ratio was due to a tendency for men to migrate to the city in search of work outside the agricultural sector, while their wives remained in a rural home.

As of 2022 it had a 100% Urban rate. It is quite young with 31.8% of the population is under 15 and 67% of the population being younger than 65 and older than 15. Only 1.1% of the population is older than 64.

== Notable architecture ==
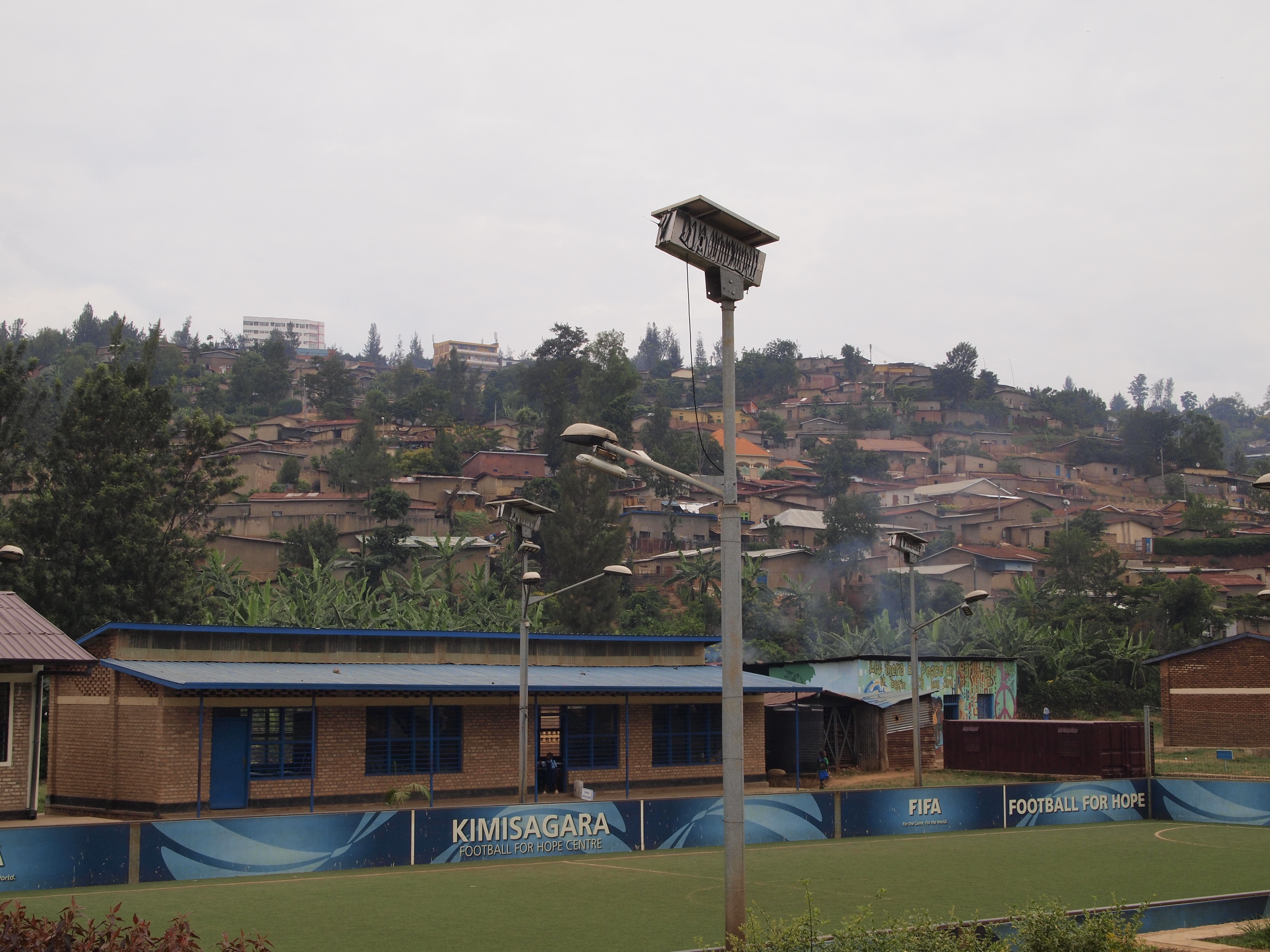
The Football for Hope Centre

It is home to the Kimisagara Water Treatment Plant, The Kimisagara Youth Centre, the Evangelical Restoration Church, and the Kimisagara Football for Hope Centre.

== Transportation ==
The KN 1 RD runs through the northern side of Kimisagara, and it meets with the KN 3 RD from the north. In the northern part of the sector is the Kigali Nyabugogo Park Bus Station usually referred to as the largest bus terminal in Kigali.

== Sectors ==
Nyarugenge district is divided into 10 sectors (imirenge): Gitega, Kanyinya, Kigali, Kimisagara, Mageragere, Muhima, Nyakabanda, Nyamirambo, Nyarugenge and Rwezamenyo.

== Inhabited places ==
The sector is divided into the following subdivisions: Kamuhoza, Katabaro, and Kimisagara.

== Education ==
The Kimisagara sector is home to the Ecole Primaire Muganza, (Muganza Primary School), and the Kamuhoza Primary School.

== Notable people ==
- Olivier Uwingabire, football defender for Kibuye FC.
- Olivier Kwizera, football goalkeeper for Al-Kawkab FC.
