= Deogratias =

Deogratias may refer to:

- Deogratias (given name), masculine given name
  - Saint Deogratias (d. 457), bishop of Carthage
- Déogratias, masculine given name
- Deogratias: A Tale of Rwanda (2000), graphic novel by Jean-Philippe Stassen
