= Gitega (Rwanda) =

Sector in the City of Kigali, Rwanda

- Location in Rwanda
- Coordinates: 1°57′21″S 30°3′18″E
- Country: Rwanda
- Provinces: City of Kigali
- Districts: Nyarugenge

Area
  - Total: 1.174 km^{2} (0.453 sq mi)
- Elevation: 1,477 m (4,846 ft)

Population
  - Total: 26,668
  - Density: 22,721/km^{2} (58,850/sq mi)
- Time zone: UTC+2

Gitega is a sector (umurenge) in the Nyarugenge District of Kigali, Rwanda. It is located in the southwest part of the city of Kigali.

== Geography ==
Its western border is shaped by an unnamed tributary of the Nyabugogo River, a tributary of the Nyabarongo River. It has an elevation of 1477 meters.

== Demographics ==
In 2012, Its population was 28,728 inhabitants, and had a gender ratio of 14,989 males to 13,739 females.

According to the 2022 census, the sector had a total population of 26,668 inhabitants. These are its Gender demographics:

- Males 13,699
- Females 12,969

The Rwanda Environment Management Authority hypothesised that the high male-to-female ratio was due to a tendency for men to migrate to the city in search of work outside the agricultural sector, while their wives remained in a rural home.

As of 2022 it had a 100% Urban rate. It is quite young with 26.8% of the population being under 15 and 71.5% of the population being younger than 65 and older than 15. Only 1.7% of the population is older than 64. It is as of 2022, the densest sector in Rwanda.

== Culture ==
It is home to the Kandt House Museum which is a nature history and history museum.

== Transportation ==
The KN 2 AV runs through the eastern border with the Nyarugenge Sector.

== Sectors ==
Nyarugenge District is divided into 10 sectors (imirenge): Gitega, Kanyinya, Kigali, Kimisagara, Mageragere, Muhima, Nyakabanda, Nyamirambo, Nyarugenge and Rwezamenyo.

== Cells ==
The sector is divided into the following cells: Akabahizi, Akabeza, Gacyamo, Kigarama, Kinyange, and Kora.

== Education ==
The Kimisagara District is home to the Cyahafi High School, and the EP Gitega kindergarten.
