= Nyakabanda =

Sector in the City of Kigali, Rwanda

- Location in Rwanda
- Coordinates: 1°58′19″S 30°2′50″E
- Country: Rwanda
- Provinces: City of Kigali
- Districts: Nyarugenge

Area
  - Total: 2.424 km^{2} (0.936 sq mi)
- Elevation: 1,583 m (5,194 ft)

Population
  - Total: 29,580

Nyakabanda is a sector in the Nyarugenge District of the City of Kigali, Rwanda. It is located in the south west part of the city of Kigali.

== Geography ==
Nyakabanda has a total area of 2.424 km,^{2} and an elevation of 1583 meters. Western Nyakabanda is home to the Mount Kigali Forest, and Mount Kigali which is just west of the Nyakabanda border.

== Demographics ==
In 2012, its population was 25,666 inhabitants, and it had a gender ratio of 13,351 males to 12,315 females.

According to the 2022 census, the sector had a total population of 29,580 inhabitants. Nyakabanda has 14,828 female inhabitants compared to 14,752 male inhabitants.

As of 2022 it had a 100% urban rate. It is quite young with 28.3% of the population being under 15 and 69.8% of the population being younger than 65, and older than 14. Only 1.9% of the population is older than 64.

== Sports ==
Nyakabanda is home to the Kigali Pelé Stadium which is a soccer stadium that can seat 22,000 spectators. It hosts APR FC and Rayon Sports.

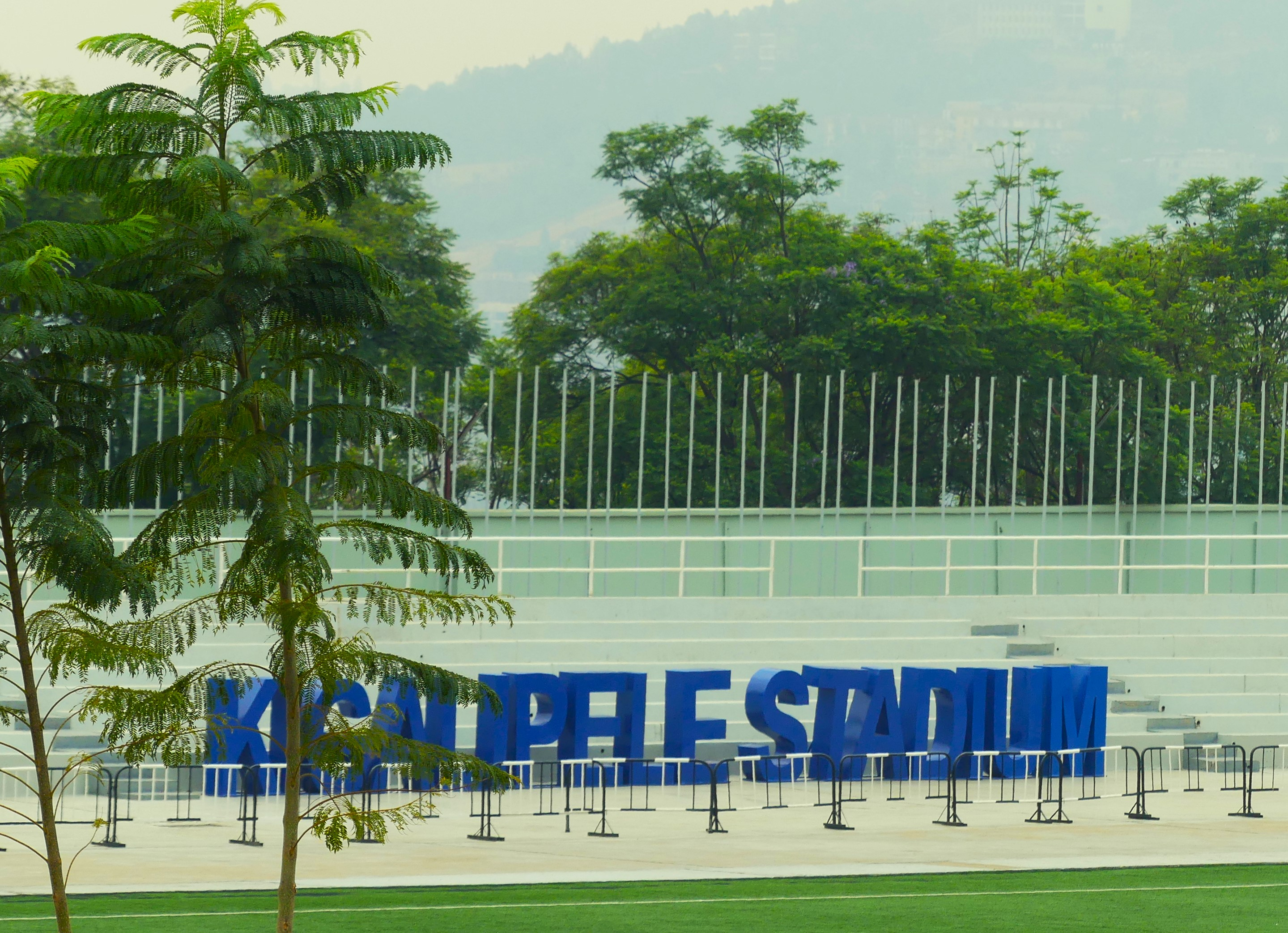
The Kigali Pelé Stadium

== Sectors ==
Nyarugenge district is divided into 10 sectors (imirenge): Gitega, Kanyinya, Kigali, Kimisagara, Mageragere, Muhima, Nyakabanda, Nyamirambo, Nyarugenge, and Rwezamenyo.

== Cells ==
The sector is divided into the following cells: Munanira I, Munanira II, Nyakabanda I, and Nyakabanda II.
