= Eugene Anangwe =

Kenyan journalist

- Born: Eugene Kenneth Anangwe; 4 June 1986 (age 40); Kenya
- Education: Mount Kenya University (Bachelor of Arts in Mass and Media Communication)
- Occupations: Media executive; Event moderator
- Years active: 2008– present
- Employer: CNBC Africa (2022–present)
- Notable work: Rwanda country manager at CNBC Africa; Former CEO TV47 Kenya

Eugene Kenneth Anangwe (born 4 June 1986) is a Kenyan journalist, TV host and media executive.

Anangwe has been Rwanda country manager at CNBC Africa, since May 2022. Prior to the appointment, he was the chief executive officer at KM Look UP Media Ltd, a Kenyan media group which host 2 tv stations, Look UP TV and Muthingi TV since August 2020. From February 2019 to August 2020, Anangwe served as a founding chief executive officer at Cape Media Ltd, an affiliate of Mount Kenya University which host TV47 Kenya and Radio 47 Kenya.

Anangwe worked as the English news broadcaster and TV host in various Rwandan media houses including TV10 Rwanda, Contact TV, royal TV and Rwanda Television (RTV) since 2008. Between 2013 and 2016, Anangwe was popular on Rwanda Television (RTV) and Contact TV as a host of Debate 411, an English TV show which brought people in open debate on live broadcasting.

== Early life ==
Anangwe was born on 4 June 1986 in the Western Province of Kenya. In 2006, he joined Kenya Regional College For Tourism and Foreign Languages (RCTFL) and graduated in 2008 with a Diploma in Mass Communication. Anangwe holds a Bachelor of Arts in Mass and Media Communication from Mount Kenya University since 2020.

== Career ==
=== Radio career ===
Anangwe started as intern radio broadcaster at Waumini FM, a catholic owned radio in Kenya in 2006. In 2008, he moved to Rwanda to work as an English news broadcaster at Contact FM until 2013. In 2013, he joined Radio 10 Rwanda to work as an English news desk editor.

=== Television career ===
Anangwe started working on television at TV 10 Rwanda as one of pioneers of English news in 2013. He later joined again Contact FM station in project of starting Contact TV in Rwanda. From 2013 to 2016, Anangwe was hosting an English TV show named Debate 411 in the beginning aired on Rwanda Television (RTV) later on Royal TV.

From 2017 Anangwe worked at Rwanda Broadcasting Agency which manage Rwanda Television (RTV) as the producer and moderator of In Focus Talk Show, and newsroom special correspondent until 2019. In his TV hosting period, Anangwe hosted some of high profile personalities including Paul Kagame, Bobi Wine, Claire Akamanzi, Louise Mushikiwabo, Benjamin Mkapa, Patrice Motsepe, Irina Bokova and Oby Ezekwesili to mention few.

=== Administration ===
In April 2014 Anangwe served in Rwanda as general manager at Contact TV until September 2015. From August 2018 to February 2019, he was a senior producer and news anchor at CNBC Africa. In February 2019, he become a founding chief executive officer at Cape Media Ltd, a Kenyan media affiliate of Mount Kenya University popular known for launching and managing TV 47 Kenya and Radio 47 stations. In his time in office, Anangwe is known as the leader of a team which set up the TV 47 Kenya stations.

In August 2020 Anangwe left Cape Media ltd to become a chief executive officer at KM Look UP Media Ltd, a Kenyan multimedia group which hosts 2 Television stations, Look UP TV and Muthingi TV. He served this position until May 2022, where he was appointed as Rwanda country manager at CNBC Africa. Anangwe is the founder and chief executive officer at East Africa Media Group, a holding company housing various projects including EAMG TV, EAMG Radio and The Anangwe Mentorship Program.
