= Simon Gicharu =

Kenyan businessperson

Simon N. Gìcharū, CBS
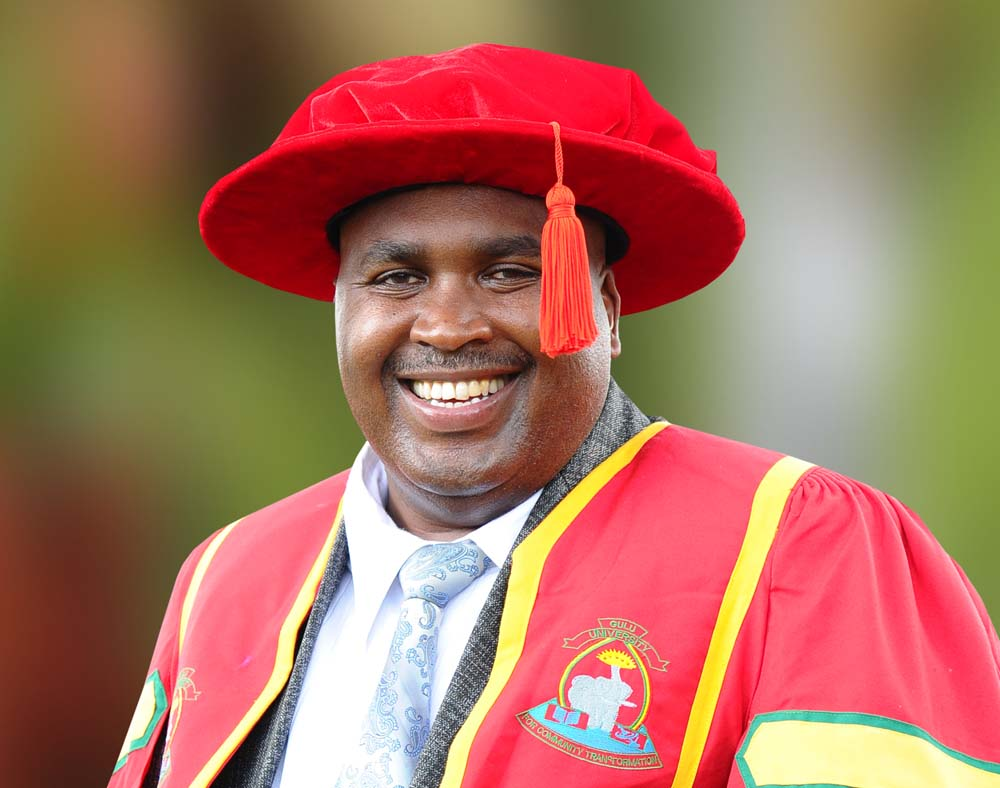
- Born: 1964 (age 61–62); Gathiruini, Kenya
- Education: Kenyatta University (Bachelor of Education); Cranfield University; Managing Enterprise Development
- Occupations: Educationist, Entrepreneur
- Years active: 1993–present
- Title: Founder and Chairman, Board of Trustees; Mount Kenya University
- Spouse: 1

Simon Gìcharū is an educationalist and founder of Mount Kenya University, which is East and Central Africa’s largest private university. He is also the founder of Mount Kigali University in Rwanda. He was born in 1964 in Gathirūini village, Kiambu County, Kenya. He is the first in a family of seven. Gìcharū is also the Chairman of the Water Services Regulatory Board and National Private Universities Owners Association of Kenya. He is the founder of Equip Africa Institute and patron of the Mount Kenya University Graduate Enterprise Academy. He is also a board member at Thika Water and Sewerage Company, and the patron of Inter Universities Rover Moot under the Kenya Scouts Association. In 2015, Gìcharū was named the Eastern African Ernst and Young Entrepreneur of the Year, and subsequently inducted into the Ernst and Young Hall of Fame. He is married with three children.

== Early life and education ==
His early life experiences were the cauldron in which his successful characteristic traits were shaped. As a pupil at Kìawairia Primary School and later Gathirūini Secondary School, Gìcharū had to walk many kilometers to and from school. His parents were peasant farmers and their small piece of land, which they tilled for subsistence, provided barely enough for their upkeep. To supplement the domestic income, Gìcharū, alongside his siblings, picked coffee at large commercials farms where he was paid by the kilo.

At Murang’a High School where he undertook his O-Levels, he was the captain in his final year. While in school, he etched a reputation for entrepreneurial acumen, and for assisting fellow students in Mathematics, a subject he excelled in.

Gìcharū obtained a Bachelor of Education Science (Honours) degree from Kenyatta University in 1990. His majors were Mathematics and Chemistry. Soon after graduation, he continued to exercise his passion for education, teaching his favourite Maths subject at various secondary schools in Kenya, and later at the Jomo Kenyatta University of Agriculture and Technology, and at the Thika Technical Training Institute. He would also author Kenya’s first post-secondary school book on Mathematics, Applied Mathematics for Craft Engineering.

== Entrepreneurship ==
Gìcharū has also previously worked as a lecturer at Thika Technical Training Institute. In 1995, he earned a British Council scholarship to study Managing Enterprise Development at Cranfield University, Britain. When he came back he established Kenya Entrepreneurship Promotion Programme (KEPP), which provided micro-loans and training to young entrepreneurs. His seed capital was only Ksh20,000 (US$220). KEPP later started offering training in Computers and changed its name to Thika School of Management Studies (TSMS), with introduction of Management courses. Gradually, TSMS increased its student enrolment and the number of courses. The type of courses it offered was determined by the job demands of the day and with the explosion in use of information science and technology, TSMS changed its name to Thika Institute of Technology (TIT) in 2003. TIT was the first private college in Kenya to be accredited to offer the Diploma programme in Pharmacy Gìcharū is also the founder of Cape Media, which owns TV47 and Radio 47 in Kenya.

== University ==
In 2008, the Institute was awarded a Letter of Interim Authority by the Commission for University Education in Kenya, to operate as an independent university under the name Mount Kenya University. The university was granted a full Charter status in 2011. At the age of 46 years, Gìcharū became the youngest Kenyan to have established a chartered university. The only other indigenous Chartered university was started by the former President Daniel Arap Moi. Mount Kenya University, with 16 Campuses and Centers in Kenya, Rwanda, Somaliland, Tanzania, Burundi and Uganda employs over 3,000 people and has a student population of about 50,000. The University is a member of Inter-university Council of East Africa and the Association of Commonwealth Universities.

== Awards ==
- "1st Class Chief of the Order of the Burning Spear (CBS)." The highest award a civilian can get in Kenya. He was accorded the title by the President of the Republic of Kenya in 2013 in recognition of his contribution to the growth of tertiary education in Kenya.
- "2016 Honorary Professorship International University of Management, Namibia"
- "2015 World Entrepreneur of the Year Hall of Fame"
- "2014 Eastern Africa Ernst and Young Entrepreneur of the Year"
- "Doctor of Science" - Received from Gulu University
- "Outstanding Alumni" - Received from his alma mater, Kenyatta University
- "Superlative Trailblazer Award" - Awarded by the Marketing Society of Kenya
