= Nyarugenge =

Coordinates: 01°58′02″S 30°03′20″E

Nyarugenge Sector
- Sector
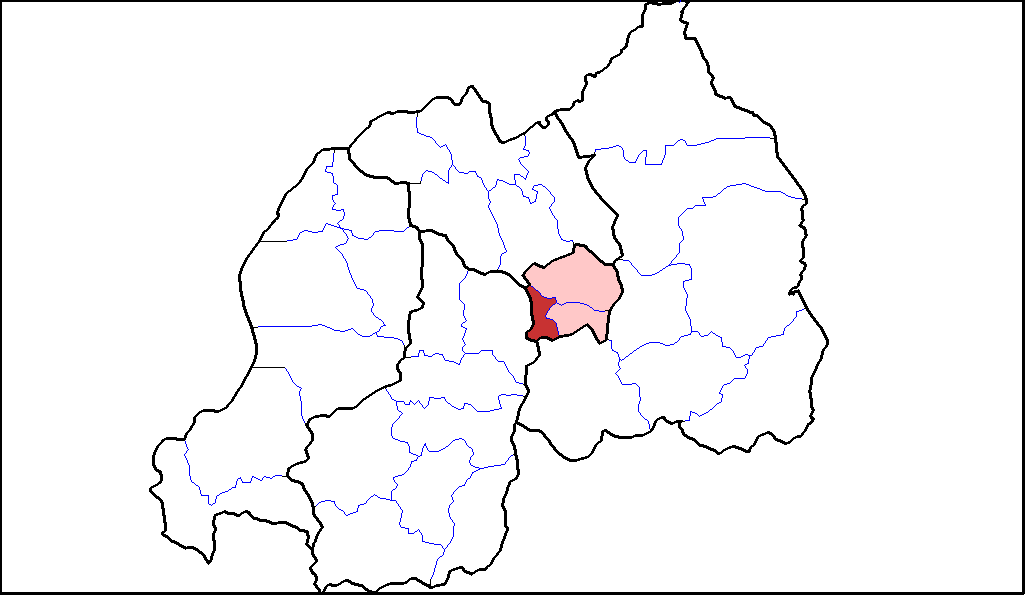
- Shown within the City of Kigali and Rwanda
- Country: Rwanda
- Province: City of Kigali
- District: Nyarugenge District
- Sector: Nyarugenge Sector

Area
  - Total: 4.627 km^{2} (1.786 sq mi)
- Elevation: 1,471 m (4,826 ft)

Population (2022 census)
  - Total: 16,665
  - Density: 3,602/km^{2} (9,330/sq mi)

Nyarugenge is a sector (umurenge) located in Nyarugenge District, City of Kigali, Rwanda.

== Location ==
It is located in the southwest part of the city of Kigali. The coordinates of Nyarugenge Sector are:1°58'02.0"S, 30°03'20.0"E (Latitude:-1.967222; Longitude:30.055556).

== Demographics ==
According to the 2022 census, it has a population of 16,665, down from 21,302 in 2012.

== Overview ==
It is primarily a commercial sector, with plenty of businesses located there. AB Bank Rwanda, a microfinance bank maintains a branch in the sector. In March 2018, Commercial Bank of Africa (Rwanda) established a branch in this area.

== Nyarugenge District ==
Nyarugenge District is divided into 10 sectors (imirenge): Gitega, Kanyinya, Kigali, Kimisagara, Mageragere, Muhima, Nyakabanda, Nyamirambo, Nyarugenge, and Rwezamenyo.
