= Nyamirambo =

Coordinates: 1°59′37″S 30°02′39″E

Nyamirambo Sector
- Sector
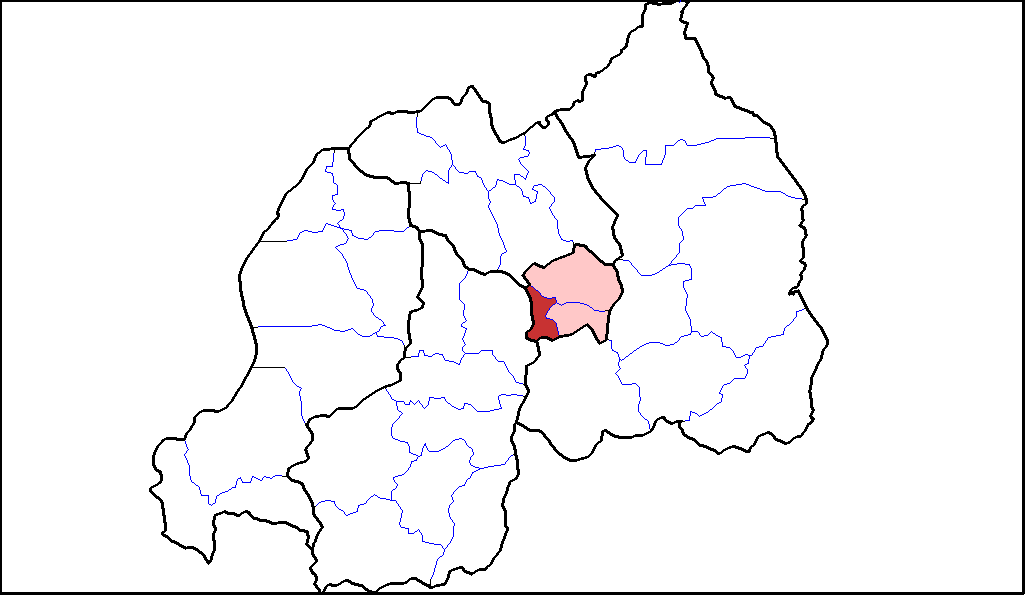
- Shown within the City of Kigali and Rwanda
- Country: Rwanda
- Province: City of Kigali
- District: Nyarugenge District
- Sector: Nyamirambo Sector

Nyamirambo is a sector (umurenge) in Nyarugenge District, City of Kigali, Rwanda.

== Location ==
It is located in the southwest part of the city of Kigali. The coordinates of Nyamirambo Sector are:1°59'37.0"S, 30°02'39.0"E (Latitude:-1.993611; Longitude:30.044167).

== Overview ==
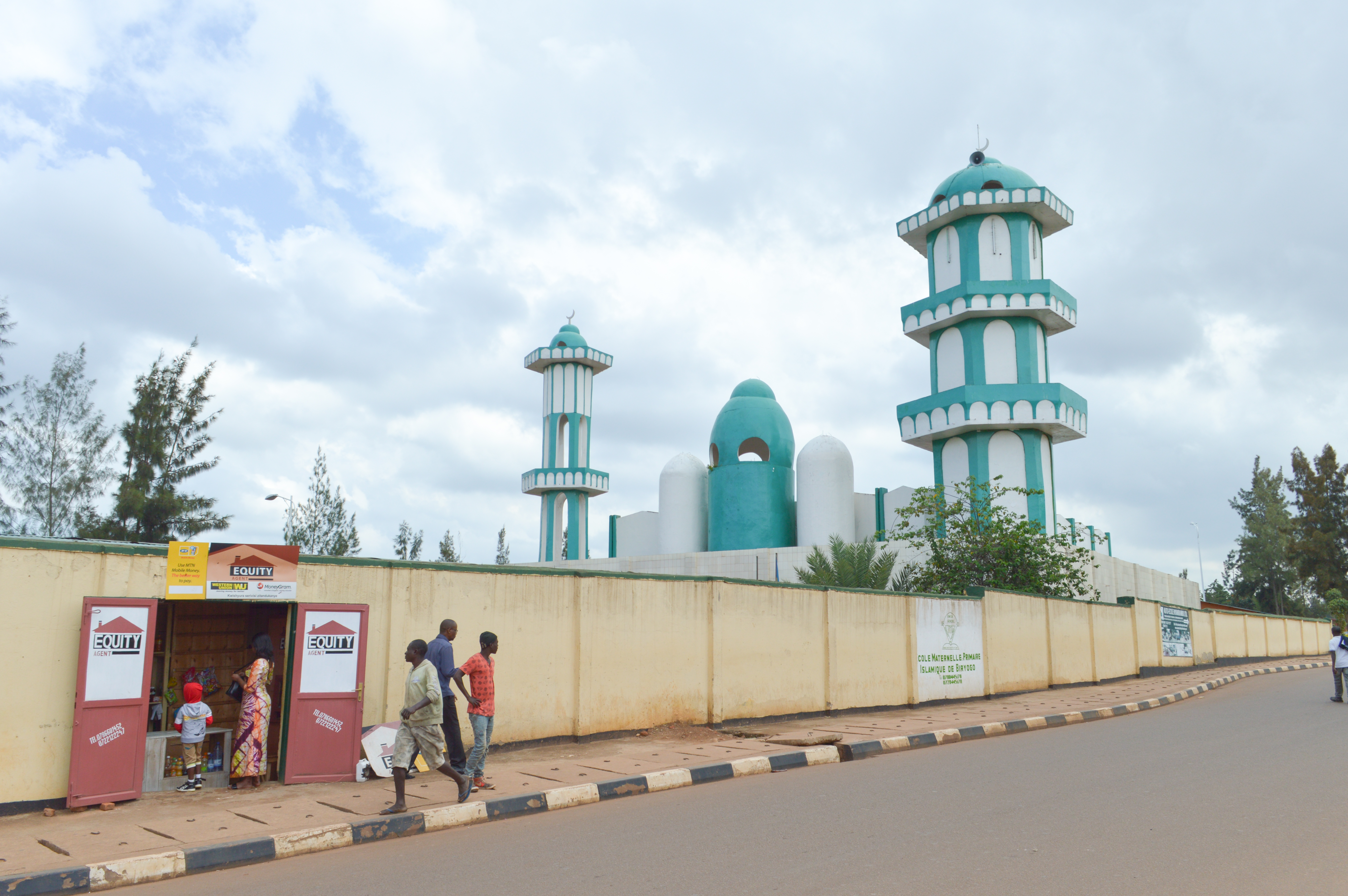
The Green Mosque (Masjid-al-Fatah) in Nyamirambo

It is a mixed residential and commercial sector, with many mosques. AB Bank Rwanda, a microfinance bank maintains a branch in the sector.

== Sectors of Nyarugenge District ==
Nyarugenge district is divided into 10 sectors (imirenge): Gitega, Kanyinya, Kigali, Kimisagara, Mageragere, Muhima, Nyakabanda, Nyamirambo, Nyarugenge, and Rwezamenyo.

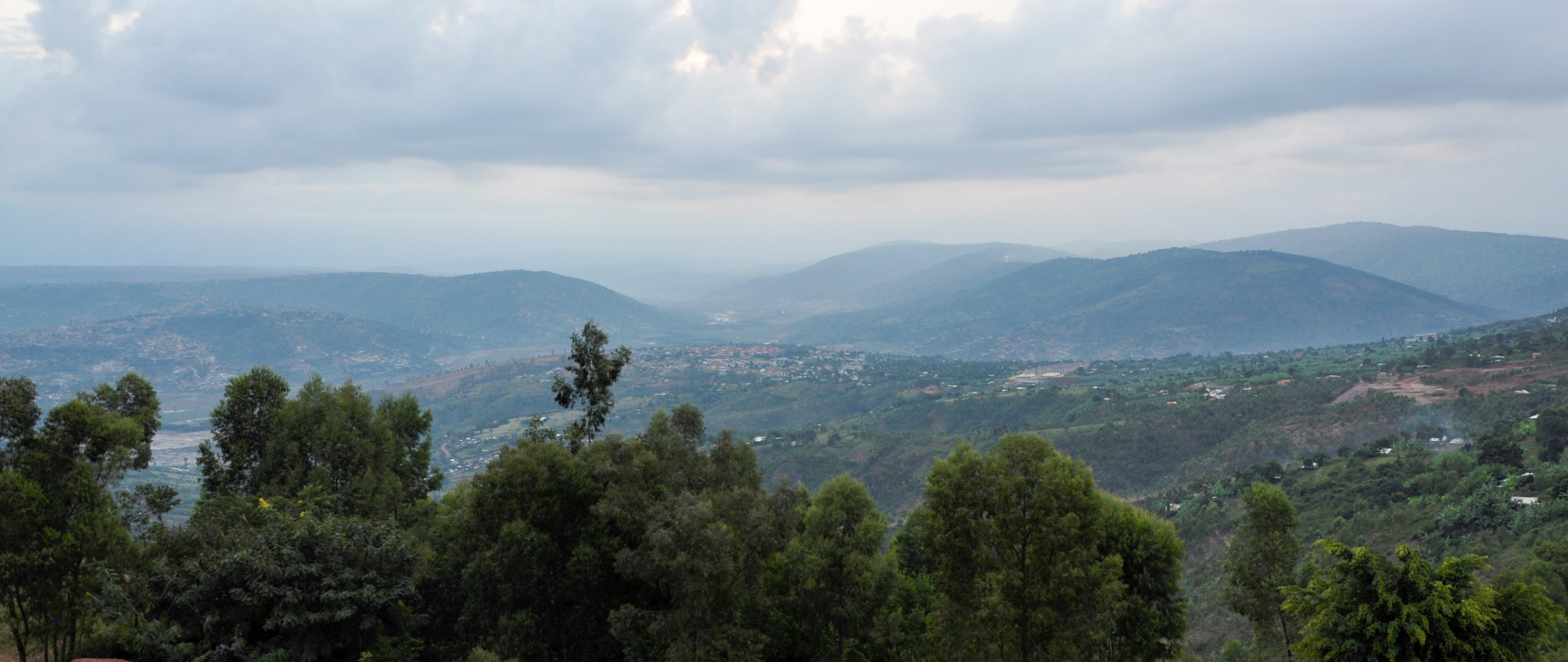
Mountain Nyamirambo
