= Islamabad Carriage Factory =

Pakistani locomotive manufacturer

Islamabad Carriage Factory اسلام آباد کیریج فیکٹری
- Company type: State-owned enterprise
- Industry: Locomotive manufacturing
- Founded: 1970; 56 years ago
- Headquarters: Islamabad, Pakistan
- Products: Passenger Coach
- Owner: Ministry of Railways
- Number of employees: 1,201

Islamabad Carriage Factory (Urdu: اسلام آباد کیریج فیکٹری) or ICF is a state-owned manufacturer of locomotives for Pakistan Railways, located in Sector I-11, Islamabad, Pakistan. It is the biggest entity managed by the Ministry of Railways of the Pakistani government. Islamabad Carriage Factory was established in 1970. It can produce 120 new passenger coaches annually and coaches created here are capable of 140 km/h speeds.

The factory occupies 58 acres in total, omitting the colony area of 83 acres, covered areas of 133.625 acres and 140.375 acres covered area. The factory had manufactured 2,011 new passengers coaches from 1971 to 2015, overhauled and up-graded 1,938 passengers coaches from 1991 to 2020 and manufactured 162 other railway related stock from 1996 to 2017.

== History ==
The company was established in 1970, in collaboration with Alstom, previously known as Linke Hofmann Busch. Its purpose is to produce domestically produced electric and diesel locomotives, reducing Pakistan Railways' reliance on imported machinery. Under the transfer of technology from Linke Hofmann Busch, passenger coaches of German design were initially produced.

As technology was changing at a rapid pace, the Carriage Factory entered into an agreement with Changchun Car Company to manufacture newly designed Chinese passenger coaches. These coaches include upgraded technology, including air spring bogies, electrical hot axle detection, riding index, durability, comfort, and a top speed of 160 km/h.

== See also ==
- Pakistan Railways
- Pakistan Locomotive Factory
- Moghalpura Railway Workshops
