= Deogratias (given name) =

Deogratias is a masculine given name. Notable people with the name include:

- Deogratias (bishop) (fl. 454–457), bishop of Carthage
- Deogratias Nkusu Bikawa, DRC politician
- Deogratias Muganwa Byabazaire, bishop of Holma, Uganda
- Deogratias Mbiku, Tanzanian Roman Catholic priest
- Deogratias Musoke (born 1949), Ugandan boxer
- Deogratias Niyizonkiza, Burundian-American founder
- Deogratias Ntukamazina, Tanzanian politician

== See also ==
- Déogratias, masculine given name
- Deogratius, masculine given name
