= Sector =

Sector may refer to:

== Places ==
- Sector, West Virginia, U.S.

== Geometry ==
- Circular sector, the portion of a disc enclosed by two radii and a circular arc
- Hyperbolic sector, a region enclosed by two radii and a hyperbolic arc
- Spherical sector, a portion of a sphere enclosed by a cone of radii from the center of the sphere

== Social and economic ==
- Business sector, part of the economy which involves the trading and sale of products by companies
- Economic sector, the manufacturing, finance and production of goods for consumers
- Private sector, business activity created by private enterprise for profit
- Public sector, delivers social services, infrastructure and institutions administered by government
- Voluntary sector, a non-profit and voluntary part of an economy provided by organisations
- The sector of the sector directive in government procurement in the European Union

== Computing ==
- Cylinder-head-sector, an early method for giving addresses to blocks of data on a hard drive
- Disk sector, a subdivision of a track on a disk
- Sector, or zone, in portal rendering
- Sector/Sphere, an open source software suite
- Sector (instrument), a historic calculating instrument

== Other uses ==
- Sector (administrative division)
- Sector clock
- Sector light
- Sector commander
- United States Coast Guard Sector, a shore-based unit of the U.S. Coast Guard
- Sector, a fictional area of space, e.g. in the Foundation series, Star Wars, StarCraft, Warhammer 40,000, Lollipop Chainsaw
  - Sector, or galactic quadrant, regions of space in Star Trek
- Sector, and Sector No Limits, watch brands
- Sector General, a series of science fiction novels by James White

== See also ==
- Area (disambiguation)
- Region (disambiguation)
- Zone (disambiguation)
- Sectoria, a small genus of stone loaches
