= Olivier Uwingabire =

Rwandan footballer

Personal information
- Date of birth: June 7, 1986 (age 40)
- Place of birth: Kimisagara, Nyarugenge District, Rwanda
- Height: 1.80 m (5 ft 11 in)
- Position: Defender

Team information
- Current team: Kibuye FC
- Number: 7

Youth career
- 1999–2001: Kigali City F.C.

Senior career*
Years	Team	Apps	(Gls)
2002	Kigali City F.C.	7	(0)
2003–2009	Rayon Sport	99	(10)
2006	→ Espérance Kigali (loan)	13	(0)
2010–	Kibuye FC		

International career
2006–2007	Rwanda	2	(0)
- * Club domestic league appearances and goals

Olivier Uwingabire (born June 7, 1986 in Rwanda) is a Rwandan football defender currently playing for Kibuye FC.

== Career ==
Uwingabire played previously for Kigali City F.C., Rayon Sport and Espérance Kigali.
