= Mageragere =

Sector in the City of Kigali, Rwanda

- Location in Rwanda
- Coordinates: 2°2′31″S 30°2′10″E
- Country: Rwanda
- Provinces: City of Kigali
- Districts: Nyarugenge

Area
  - Total: 54.65 km^{2} (21.10 sq mi)
- Elevation: 1,810 m (5,940 ft)

Population
  - Total: 59,747

Mageragere is a sector (umurenge) in the Nyarugenge District of City of Kigali, Rwanda It is located in the southwest part of the city of Kigali.

Mageragere Sector is one of the 10 sectors that make up Nyarugenge District. It is a sector that used to be part of the former Butamwa District before administrative reforms.

Mageragere sector is particularly notable as the location of the Nyarugenge Correctional Facility. This modern facility replaced the historical Kigali Central Prison PCK 1930, which was formerly the main prison in Kigali City.

== Geography ==
Mageragere has an area of 54.8 km^{2}, which makes it the largest sector in Nyarugenge, and the 2nd largest in Kigali. it has a max altitude of 1810 meters. The sector is bordered by the Nyabarongo River on the west and southern sides. The sector contains mostly hilly terrain.

== Demographics ==
In 2012, Mageragere had a population of 23,407. It had a gender ratio of 11,925 females to 11,482 males.

According to the 2022 census, Mageragere had a total population of 59,747 inhabitants, 34,038 of which were male and 25,709 of which were female. The Rwanda Environment Management Authority hypothesized that the high male-to-female ratio was due to a tendency for men to migrate to the city in search of work outside the agricultural sector, while their wives remained in a rural home. The residents live a rural lifestyle. They practice agriculture, and the main source of energy they use for cooking is firewood.

As of 2022, Mageragere had a 59% urban rate, and a 41% rural rate. Approximately one-third of the population (32.7%) is under 15, and 64.4% is between the ages of 15 and 64; 2.9% of the population is above the age of 64.

== Sectors ==
Nyarugenge district is divided into 10 sectors (imirenge): Gitega, Kanyinya, Kigali, Kimisagara, Mageragere, Muhima, Nyakabanda, Nyamirambo, Nyarugenge, and Rwezamenyo.

== Cells ==
Mageragere Sector is divided into 7 Cells (Utugali): Nyarufunzo, Kankuba, Mataba, Nyarurenzi, Runzenze, Ntungamo, and Kavumu.
