= Rwezamenyo =

Sector in Rwandan district

- Sector
- Location in Rwanda
- Coordinates: 1°58′7″S 30°3′20″E
- Country: Rwanda
- Province: City of Kigali
- District: Nyarugenge

Area
  - Land: 1.027 km^{2} (0.397 sq mi)
- Elevation: 1,524 m (5,000 ft)

Population (2022 census)
  - Total: 14,754
  - Density: 14,370/km^{2} (37,210/sq mi)
- (2022 census)
- Time zone: UTC+2 (CAT)
  - Summer (DST): UTC+2 (not observed)

Rwezamenyo is a sector (umurenge) in the City of Kigali, Nyarugenge District, Rwanda. It is located in the southwest part of the city of Kigali.

== Geography ==
It has an elevation of 1524 meters. It is, as of 2026, the smallest sector by square kilometers in Rwanda with an area of 1.027 square kilometers.

== Demographics ==
In 2012, its population was 16,763 inhabitants, and a gender ratio of 8,718 male to 8,045 females.

According to the 2022 census, the sector had a total population of 14,754 inhabitants, including 7,556 males and 7,198 females.

The Rwanda Environment Management Authority has hypothesized that the high male-to-female ratio is due to a tendency for men to migrate to the city in search of work outside the agricultural sector, while their wives remained in a rural home.

Approximately one quarter of the population (24.1%) is under 15, and 73.3% is between the age of 14 and 64; 2.6% are over the age of 64.

It is the second smallest by population in Kigali only being beaten out by the Kikukiro Sector, in the Kicukiro District.

== Sectors ==
Nyarugenge district is divided into 10 sectors (imirenge): Gitega, Kanyinya, Kigali, Kimisagara, Mageragere, Muhima, Nyakabanda, Nyamirambo, Nyarugenge, and Rwezamenyo.

== Cells ==
The sector is divided into the following cells: Kabuguru i, Kabuguru ii, Rwezamenyo i, and Rwezamenyo ii.
