= Mount Kigali University =

University in Kigali, Rwanda

Coordinates: 1.9884°S 30.0983°E

Mount Kigali University is a private university in Kigali, Rwanda.

== History ==
The university was founded in 2010 by Simon Gicharu, a former teacher, as a campus of Mount Kenya University. It was renamed as Mount Kigali University in 2023 after receiving a Charter from the Higher Education Council of Rwanda. The university is named after Mount Kigali, a 1,853 metres (6,079 ft) hill in the west of Kigali city.

In 2010, the East African Community countries of Kenya, Uganda, Tanzania, Rwanda and Burundi signed a Common Market Protocol that allowed for free movement of goods and labour among the member countries. Mount Kenya University ventured into Rwanda the same year.

In September 2015, the government of Rwanda suspended the university's campus in Kigali from offering undergraduate courses in nursing, pharmacy, medical laboratory sciences and public health due to non-compliance.

Upon granting of a Charter, Mount Kigali University named Innocent Mugisha as chairman of its council.
