= Kigali (sector) =

Sector in Rwandan district

- Sector
- Location in Rwanda
- Coordinates: 1°56′59″S 30°3′31″E
- Country: Rwanda
- Province: City of Kigali
- District: Nyarugenge

Area
  - Total: 29.38 km^{2} (11.34 sq mi)
- Elevation: 1,444 m (4,738 ft)

Population (2022 census)
  - Total: 61,499
  - Density: 2,093/km^{2} (5,421/sq mi)
- (2022 census)
- Time zone: UTC+2 (CAT)
  - Summer (DST): UTC+2 (not observed)

Kigali is a sector (umurenge) in Nyarugenge District, Kigali City, Rwanda. It is located in the west part of the city of Kigali City. It used to be part of the Butamwa District before the administrative reforms in 2006.

== Geography ==
The sectors western border is shaped by the Nyabarongo River. its northern border is shaped by the Nyabugogo River which is a tributary of the Nyabarongo River. The altitude of Kigali is 1444 meters.

== Demographics ==
In 2012, its population was 30,023, and it had a gender ratio of 15,375 males to 14,648 females. It had 25,275 rural residents to 4,748 urban residents.

in the 2022 census, its population was 61,499 inhabitants. The sector had a male to female ratio of 32,124 males to 29,375 females. The Rwanda Environment Management Authority hypothesized that the high male-to-female ratio was due to a tendency for men to migrate to the city in search of work outside the agricultural sector, while their wives remained in a rural home.

Its urban to rural ratio is 44,185 urban inhabitants to 17,314 rural inhabitants, which is a huge increase since 2012.

== Sectors ==
Nyarugenge district is divided into 10 sectors (imirenge): Gitega, Kanyinya, Kigali, Kimisagara, Mageragere, Muhima, Nyakabanda, Nyamirambo, Nyarugenge, and Rwezamenyo.

== Inhabited places ==
The sector is divided into the following cells: Kankuba, Kavumu, Ntungama, Runzenze, Nyarurenzi, Mataba, and Nyarufunzo.
