= TV47 Kenya =

Television station based in Kenya

- Country: Kenya
- Broadcast area: Kenya; Rwanda; Burundi; United States; Uganda; Worldwide through media streaming, Facebook, Instagram, Twitter and YouTube
- Headquarters: Cape Media Limited, Muthaiga North Road.{{small] Muthaiga}}, Nairobi

Programming
- Languages: English (US), Swahili
- Picture format: 1080i (HDTV) (Downgraded to letterboxed 576i for SDTV feed)

Ownership
- Owner: Cape Media Ltd

History
- Launched: 2019; 7 years ago

Links
- Website: tv47.co.ke

Availability

Terrestrial
- DStv: Channel 268
- GOtv: Channel 20
- Zuku TV: Channel 69 (Zuku Fiber only)

TV47 is a television channel based in Kenya. It is owned by Cape Media Limited, an affiliate of Mount Kenya University. It was launched in 2019 by Cape Media Limited, Mwenda Njoka as the chief executive officer and its main broadcast languages are English and Kiswahili. TV47 is a late entrant in the mass media in Kenya. There are more than 50 television stations in Kenya. These stations include Citizen TV, by Royal Media Services of Samuel Kamau Macharia, Kenya Television Network by The Standard (Kenya), NTV (Kenyan TV channel) by Nation Media Group, and K24 TV by Media Max Limited.

The station started as Lemigo TV in Kigali, Rwanda in 2014. Lemigo changed its name to Royal TV, and later to TV47 when it left the Rwandan market for Kenya. TV47 is licensed by the Communication Authority of Kenya. An October to December 2020 survey by Geopoll, a media audience research firm shows that its audience is in the 15–34 years age group. It also available, on several platforms. In November 2021, the TV station received a complaint from the Media Council of Kenya for violating the Journalists Code of Conduct.

== News and programmes ==
TV47 broadcasts news and entertainment programmes. These include soap operas, political talk shows, and live events.

=== News ===
- TV47 Matukio
- Upeo Wa TV47
- TV47 News Now
- Daily Report

=== Programmes ===
- Churchill Show
- Morning Cafe
- The Grind
- All Access
- Men's Conference
- Banterzone
- Sifa Sunday
- The Realtor
- Tasnia Ya Elimu
- Kids on the Block
- Irie Vybz
- Africa Express
- Beyond The Limit
- Destiny
- So Much Love
- Beat Plug
- This Friday with Betty

== Presenters ==
- Mwanaisha Chidzuga
- Frederick Muitiriri
- Abubakar Abdullahi
- Elizabeth Mutuku
- Sharon Baranga
- Linda Alela
- Joash Onsare
- Muthoni Maina
- Mwangi Maina
- Paul Kirobi
- Andrine Kilemi
- Errol Silverman
- Dennis Otieno
- Tony Mwirigi
- Bancey Kimuyu
- Heminigilder Mugeni
- Eric Munene
- Betty Kyalo (Host: This Friday with Betty)
- Willis Raburu
- Edward Akai
- Quinto Wafula

== Location ==
TV47 is located in West End Park Court, Muthaiga North Rd, Nairobi
