= AB Bank Rwanda =

Microfinance bank in Rwanda

- Company type: Private
- Industry: Financial services
- Founded: 2013
- Headquarters: Kigali, Rwanda
- Key people: Zachary Raymond; Managing Director
- Products: Loans, Checking, Savings, Investments, Debit Cards
- Total assets: US$5.54 million (RWF:3.683 billion) (2013)
- Website: www.abbank.rw

AB Bank Rwanda (ABR) is a microfinance bank in Rwanda. The bank is one of the licensed banks in the Republic of Rwanda.

== Overview ==
ABR is a Rwandan microfinance bank, wholly owned by International institutions, that was established in 2013. It is affiliated with, and is subsidiary of AccessHolding, a commercial microfinance investment and holding company based in Germany, with subsidiaries in Azerbaijan, Madagascar, Tanzania, Nigeria, Liberia, Tajikistan, Zambia and Rwanda.

== History ==
The bank was granted a banking license by the National Bank of Rwanda, the national banking regulator, in 2013 and commenced commercial banking services in the same year. By June 2014, AB Bank Rwanda maintained over 4,000 deposit accounts and more than 1,300 loan accounts. The loan book exceeded RWF:1 billion (US$1.5 million).

== Ownership ==
The stock of the bank is privately owned by institutional investors. As of December 2013, the shareholding in the bank is as depicted in the table below:

AB Bank Rwanda Stock Ownership

Rank	Name of Owner	Percentage Ownership
1	AccessHolding	67.9
2	German Development Bank (KfW)	17.1
3	International Finance Corporation (IFC)	15
	Total	100.00

== Branch network ==
As of March 2019, the bank maintains six branches and six credit outlets across the country.

1. Nyamirambo Branch - Nyamirambo, Kigali
2. Nyarugenge Branch - Nyarugenge, Kigali - Main Branch
3. Gisozi Branch - Gasabo, Kigali
4. Kimironko Branch -Kimironko, Kigali
5. Nyabugogo Branch - Nyabugogo, Kigali
6. Musanze Branch - Musanze
7. Muhanga Credit Outlet - Muhanga
8. Rwamagana Credit Outlet - Rwamagana
9. Kabarondo Credit Outlet - Kabarondo
10. Huye Credit Outlet - Huye
11. Gicumbi Credit Outlet - Gicumbi
12. Nyagatare Credit Outlet - Nyagatare
13. Rubavu Credit Outlet - Rubavu
14. Rusizi Credit Outlet - Kamembe
15. Nyamata Credit Outlet - Bugesera
16. Nyanza Credit Outlet - Nyanza
17. Ruhango Credit Outlet - Ruhango

== See also ==
- List of banks in Rwanda
- Economy of Rwanda
