= I-11, Islamabad =

I-11 آئی ۱۱
- Sector
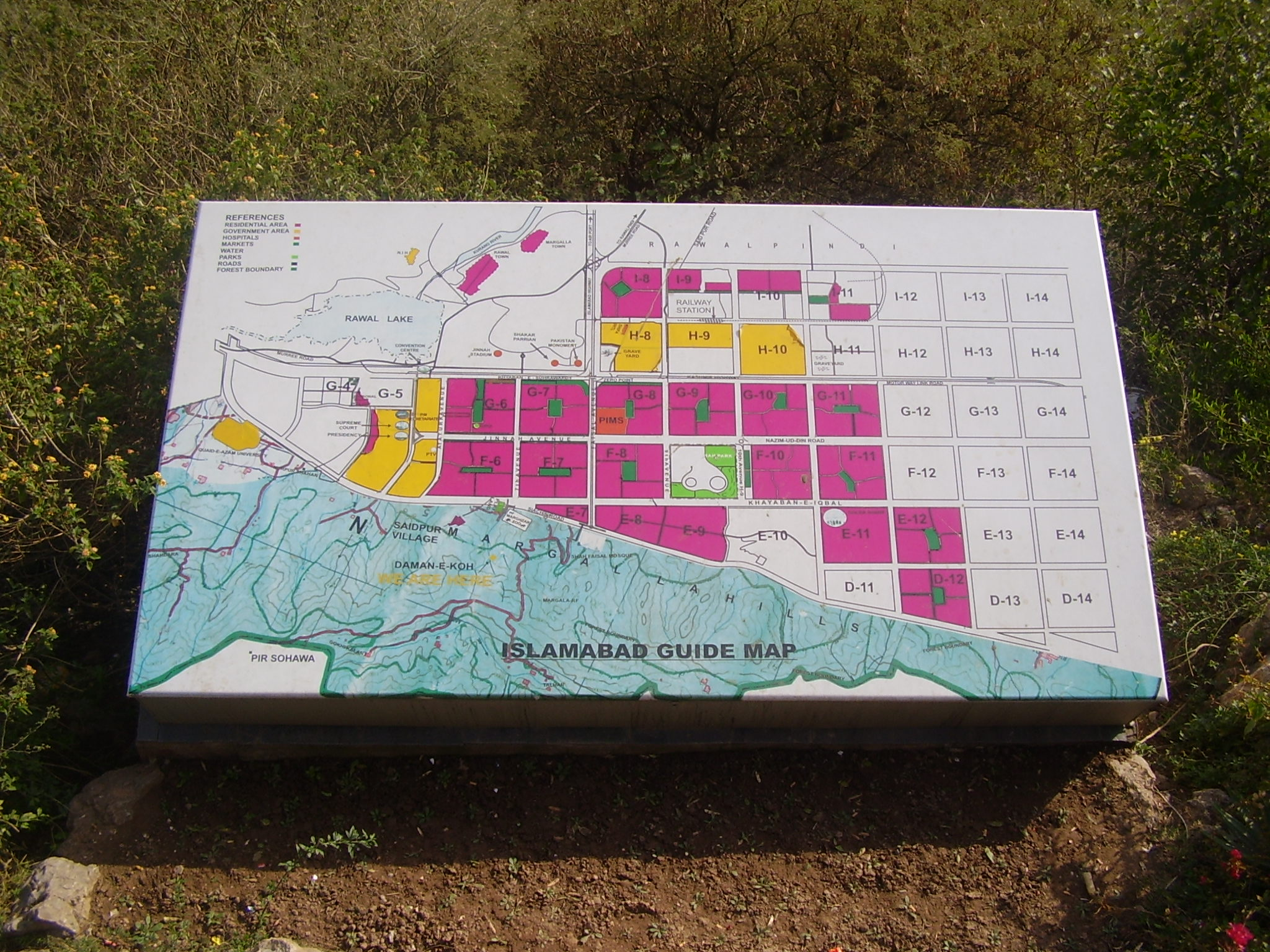
- Map of Islamabad, with I-11 visible at the top. Click to enlarge
- Country: Pakistan
- Territory: Islamabad Capital Territory
- City: Islamabad
- Time zone: UTC+5 (PST)

I-11 is a sector of Islamabad, Pakistan. It is a lightly built area, located on the southwestern edge of the city. I-11 borders Rawalpindi to the south and neighbors I-10 and I-12, while sectors H-10, H-11 and H-12 are located adjacent. CDA has taken the possession of land from illegal encroachers and land grabbers and development work has started to hand over the possession to original owners of the plots.

== Background ==
Sector I-11 was established by CDA in 1985 mainly for the people falling in low-income bracket of the income. Sector consists of small plots measuring 7.6 m x 12.1 m, 7.6 m x 15.2 m and 7.6 m x 18.2 m. Small plots are located in sub-sector I-11/1 and comparatively larger residential plots are located in I-11/2. I-11/4 consists of a wholesale Fruits & Vegetable Market called Sabzi Mandi along with a police station called Sabzi Mandi Police Station with jurisdiction over I-11, I-12, I-10 and IJP Road adjacent to these sectors.

Sector I-11/3 was demarcated as site for wholesale market of cloths, shoes, grain and timber and two large plots was allocated for State-of-art Cash and Carry Establishments. Huge space was reserved for Public Parking in I-11 along with Schools and colleges.

== Master Plan ==
CDA Approved master plan of the Sector and compensation was paid to affected people who were displaced by the development. Formerly this area along with I-10 and I-12 was a village called Bokra. A road has been named in I-12 to commemorate the old village.

Residential plots measuring 7.6 m × 15.2 m and 7.6 m x 12.1 m were carved out. Existing Food godowns, granary and cold storage was made the part of Master Plan. Existing Railways Carriage Factory was also included in the master plan. PHA was allocated land for D and E type flats in I-11/1.

== Existing Facilities ==
Railways Carriage Factory that has been made into a Corporation in 2012 Nur Junction: that will be an important junction when Kashmir Railways Project will be launched in future. Government Granaries and Food Godowns.

== Newly Developed Facilities ==
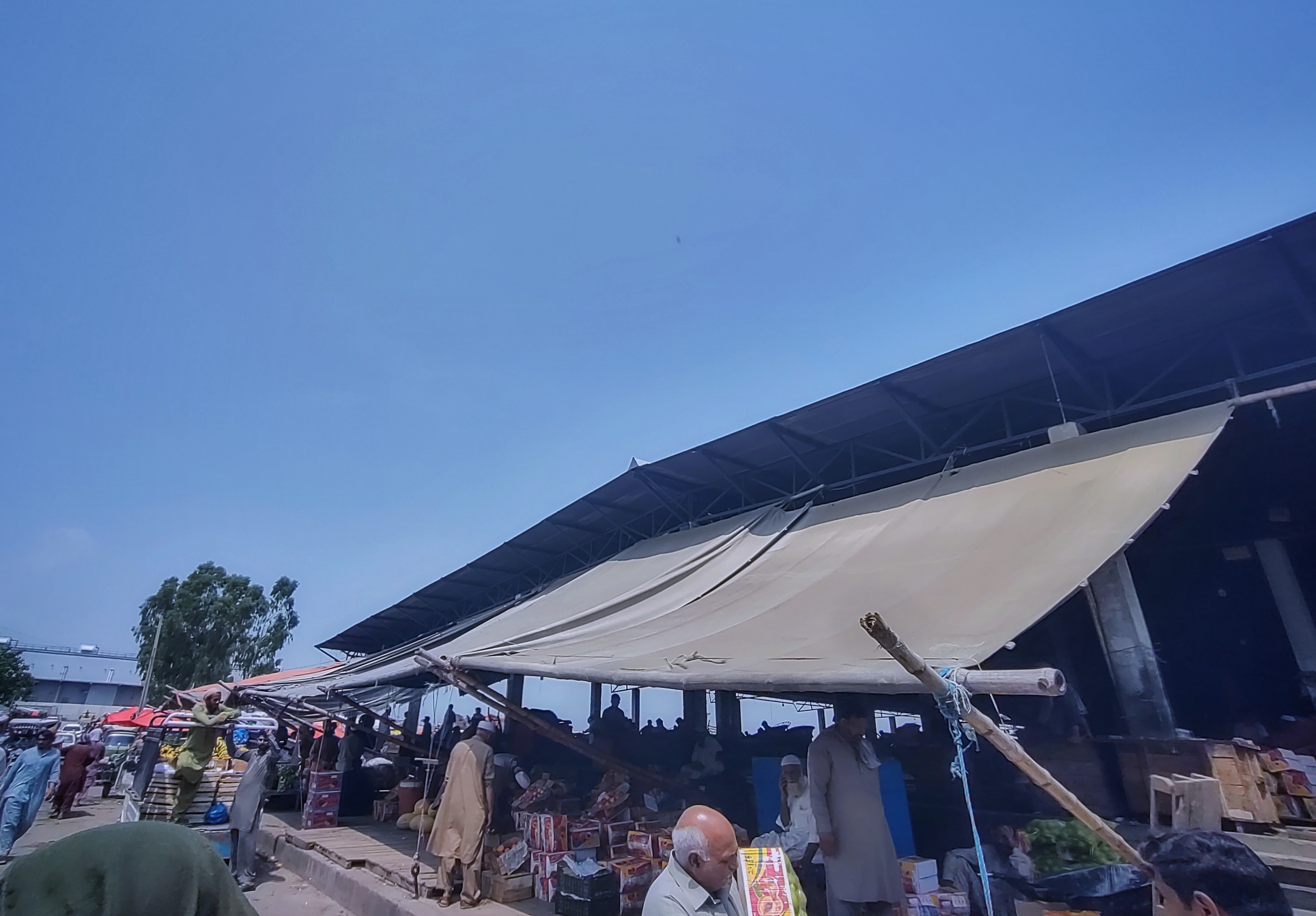
I-11 Fruit and Vegetable Market

Fruit and Vegetable Market for twin cities of Islamabad and Rawalpindi. Northern Areas Transport Corporation (NATCO) Terminal. Police Station Sabzi Mandi. Metro Cash & Carry. Wholesale Commodity, accessories and food market. Residential Plots for Low Income Bracket People

== Polio in Afghan Abadi ==
Recently a study was conducted and a sewage sample from I-11 tested positive for polio.

== Taliban Influence in I-11 ==
Illegal Settlers were mostly Taliban Silent Supports and an informal Taliban Court was operating in the settlement. It was reported that this court banned the Polio Vaccine in the area and called to kill everyone who facilitates or administer polio vaccine to people. The settlement was declared as security risk to Islamabad formally many times and Islamabad High Court ordered the evacuation.

== Islamabad High Court Takes Notice and orders elimination of Security Risk ==
Islamabad High Court directed CDA and Law Enforcement Agencies to eliminate the security risk from Islamabad and issues order to CDA and all concerned to demolish illegal Afghan Abadi.

== Demolition of I-11 Illegal Settlement ==
On July 30, 2015, the Capital Development Authority demolished an illegal settlement in I-11, housing 20,000 - 25,000 people hailing mostly from the Khyber Pakhtunkhwa and the Federally Administered Tribal Areas. The settlement was the largest illegal settlement in Islamabad and had been established on occupied plots of people who paid legally to CDA as far back as the early 1980s. At that time the occupation was ignored by Zia regime that was acting as recruiter for CIA-sponsored Afghan Jihad. The original inhabitants were Afghan refugees but later on the refugee camp vanished and a full-fledged occupation of the public land gradually started by different people of criminal backgrounds from Khyber Pakhtoonkhua and FATA. The settlement is erroneously referred to as 'Afghan Basti', as it was originally established by Afghan refugees, however according to a 2013 survey by the UNHCR, the vast majority of residents were Pakistani nationals. The I-11 illegal settlers were compensated by Musharraf government with money and plots but they returned to reoccupy the land.

The action was taken after Islamabad High Court judge Shaukat Aziz Siddiqui ordered the CDA to raze all informal settlements in the capital city. The settlement was long considered as No-Go-Area for Police and was bastion of all kinds of criminals including high-profile terrorists, Car-jacking Rings, Drug Mafia and criminal elements involved from petty thefts to child-prostitution. I-11 Afghan Abadi was illegally built on the plots allotted to different people in 1980 - 1985. The settlement served as breeding ground for Jihadis and provided critical spy-rackets to different insurgent and terrorist groups operating in Islamabad. During 1980_85, I-11 was a barren land and there was no plan of developing the area. Even now the area is still under-developed. During the period of Shaheed Zia Ul Haq, Afghanis accommodated in I-11 were just refugees and not terrorists. The terrorist emerged in 2004 onward in Pakistan.
