= Déogratias =

Déogratias is a masculine given name. Notable people with the name include:

- Déogratias Nsabimana, chief of staff of the Rwandan Armed Forces
- Déogratias Nsanganiyumwami, Burundian politician

== See also ==
- Deogratias (given name)
- Deogratius
