= Regions of Argentina =

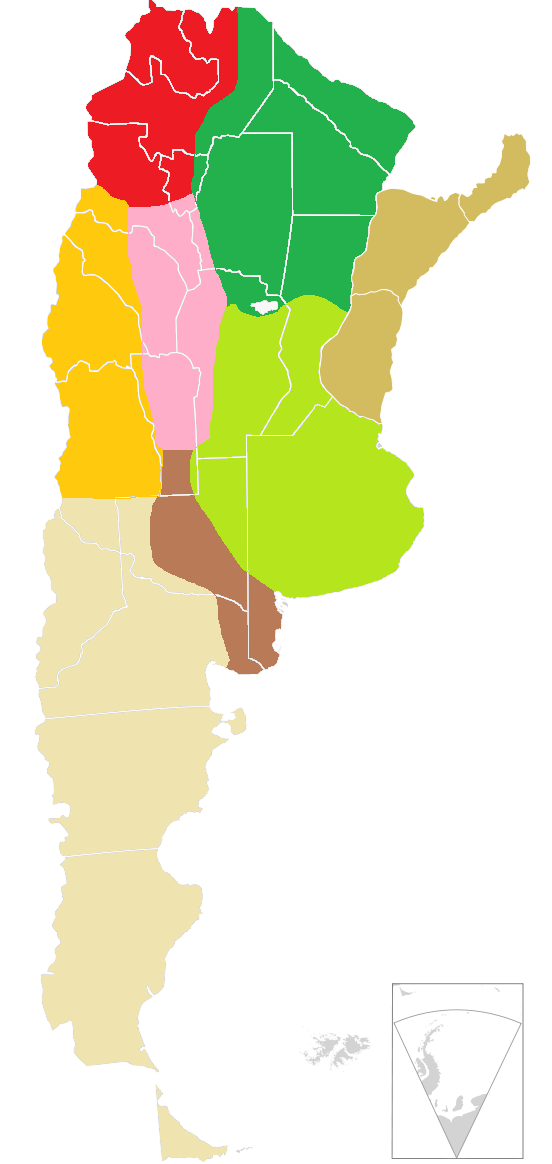
Geographical regions of Argentina: Northwest Chaco Region Mesopotamia Cuyo Sierras pampeanas Pampas Dry Pampas Patagonia Antarctica and South Atlantic islands

The provinces of Argentina are often grouped into eight geographical regions.

== Regions ==
From West to East and North to South, these are:

- Pampas region: Buenos Aires, Córdoba, Santa Fe, La Pampa and Entre Ríos
- Argentine Northwest: Jujuy, Salta, Tucumán, Catamarca, Santiago del Estero and La Rioja
- Cuyo region: San Juan, Mendoza and San Luis
- Argentine Northeast: Misiones, Corrientes, Formosa and Chaco
- Eastern Patagonia: Río Negro, Neuquén, Chubut, Santa Cruz and Tierra del Fuego
- Argentine Antarctica: Tierra del Fuego

And is sometimes considered as a region:

- Argentine Littoral: Entre Ríos, Misiones, Corrientes, Santa Fe, Formosa and Chaco

Nevertheless, there are different approaches to the Argentine regions. The Pampas are often separated into Humid Pampa and Dry Pampas, and sometimes in Llanura Pampeana and Sierras Pampeanas. Other geographical analysis include other defined regions, being Comahue and Chaco Central among the most common.

Regardless of the regions system used, some provinces are shared by more than one region. For instance, Southwestern Santiago del Estero is sometimes considered part of the Sierras area, or even the Humid Pampa, while the Southern part of La Pampa is sometimes called Dry Pampa and included in Patagonia. Finally, La Rioja is sometimes considered part of Cuyo region instead of the Northwest.

Finally, the portion of the Antarctica claimed by Argentina is known as Argentine Antarctica, in which lay a number of Argentine bases.

== Extended regions ==
- Pampas region
  - Humid Pampa
  - Dry Pampa
- Argentine Northwest
- Cuyo region
- Argentine Northeast
- Eastern Patagonia
  - Comahue
- Argentine Antarctica (under Antarctic Treaty)
- Argentine Littoral
  - Mesopotamia

== Natural Regions ==
Humid Pampas

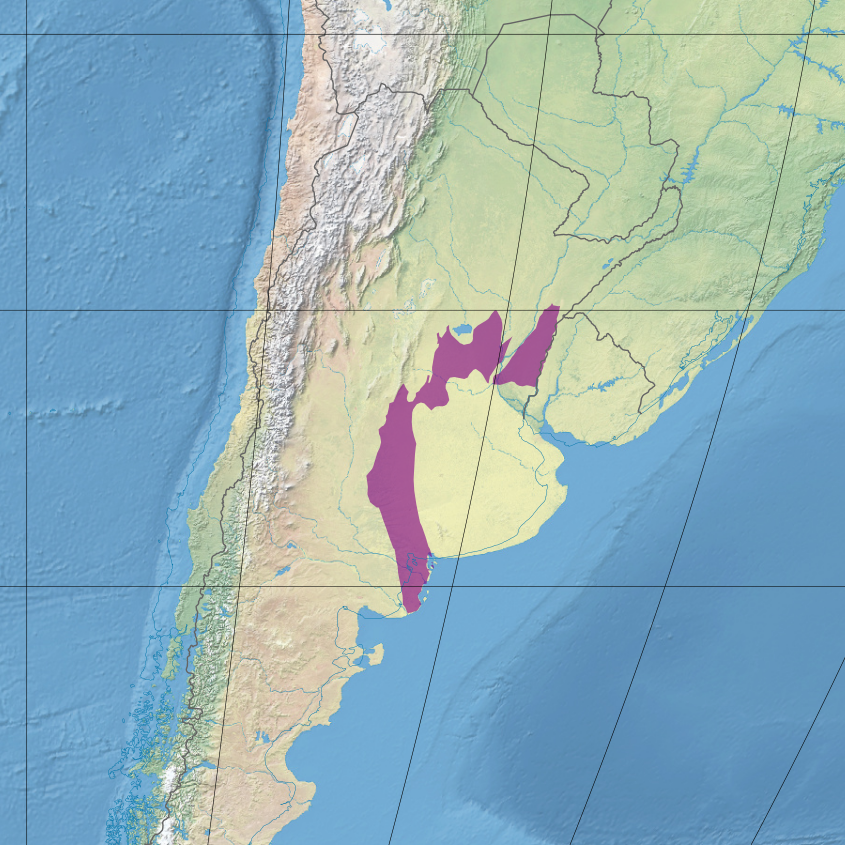
Argentine Espinal

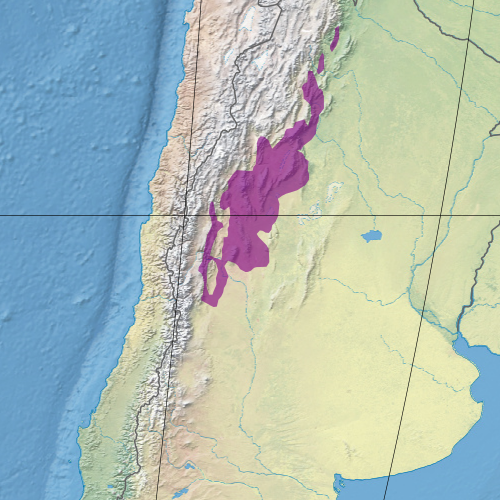
High Monte

Central Andean dry puna

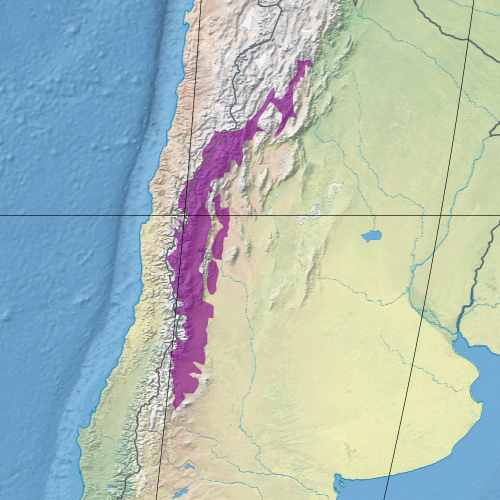
Southern Andean steppe

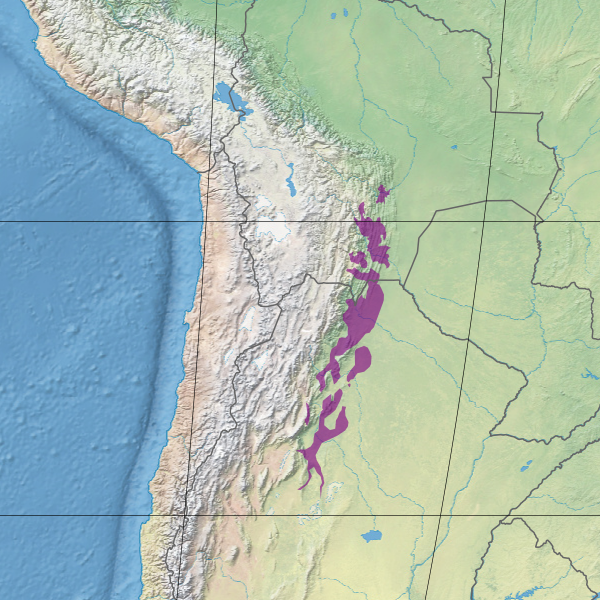
Southern Andean Yungas

Dry Chaco

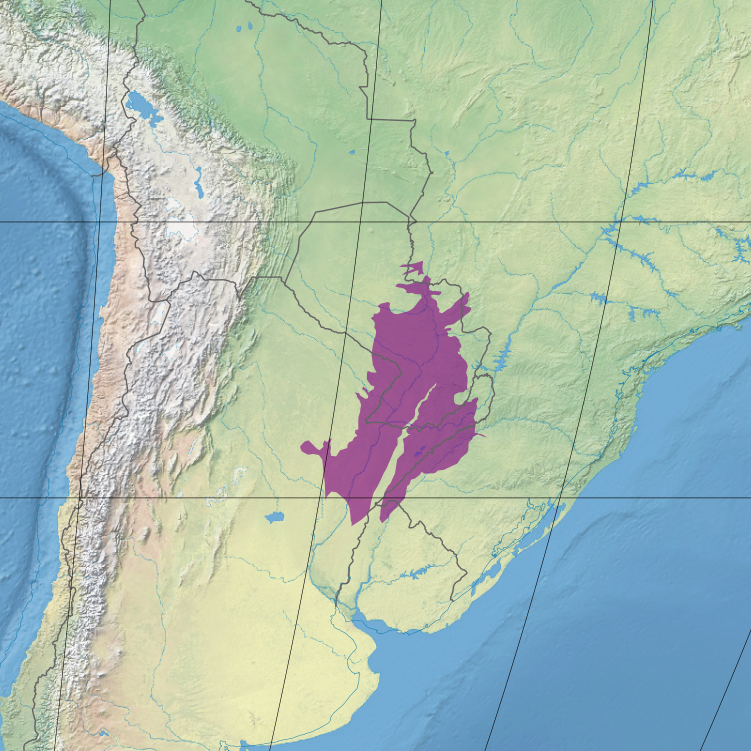
Humid Chaco

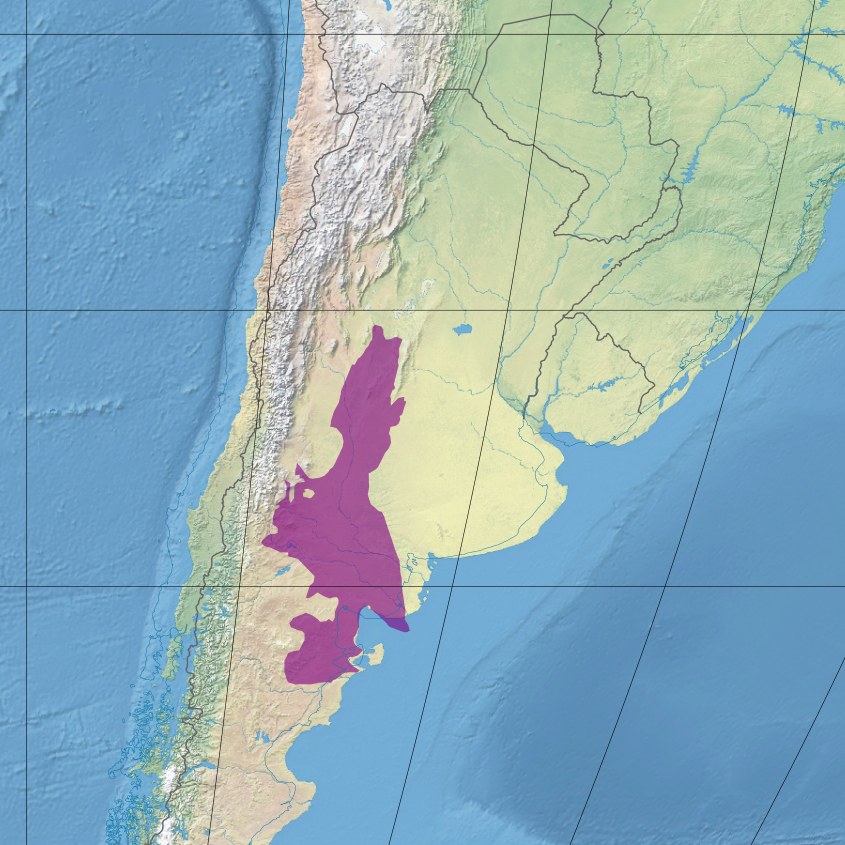
Monte Desert

Valdivian temperate forests

Patagonian Desert

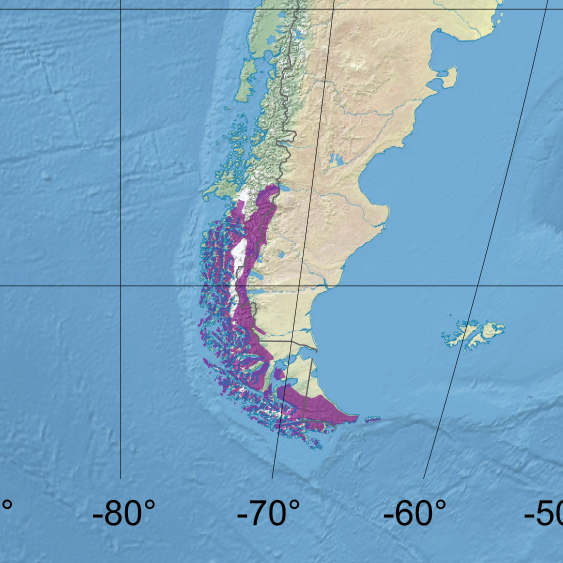
Magellanic subpolar forests

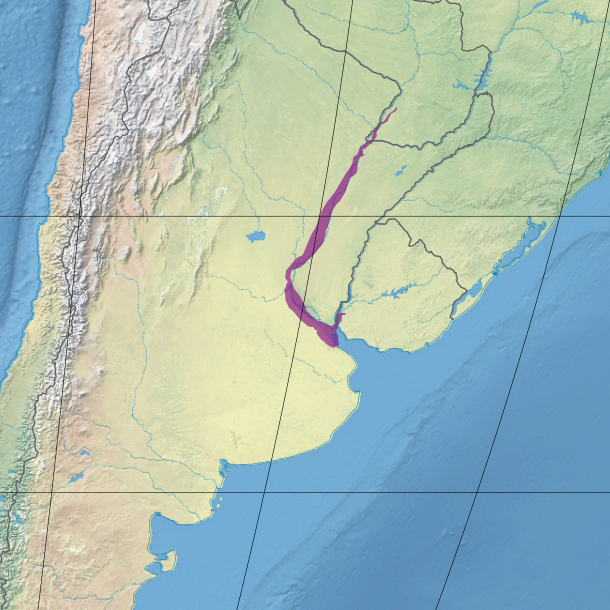
Paraná flooded savanna

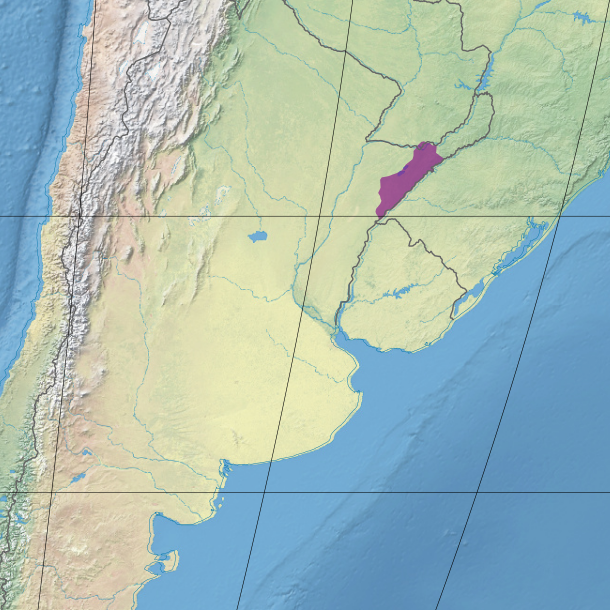
Southern Cone Mesopotamian savanna

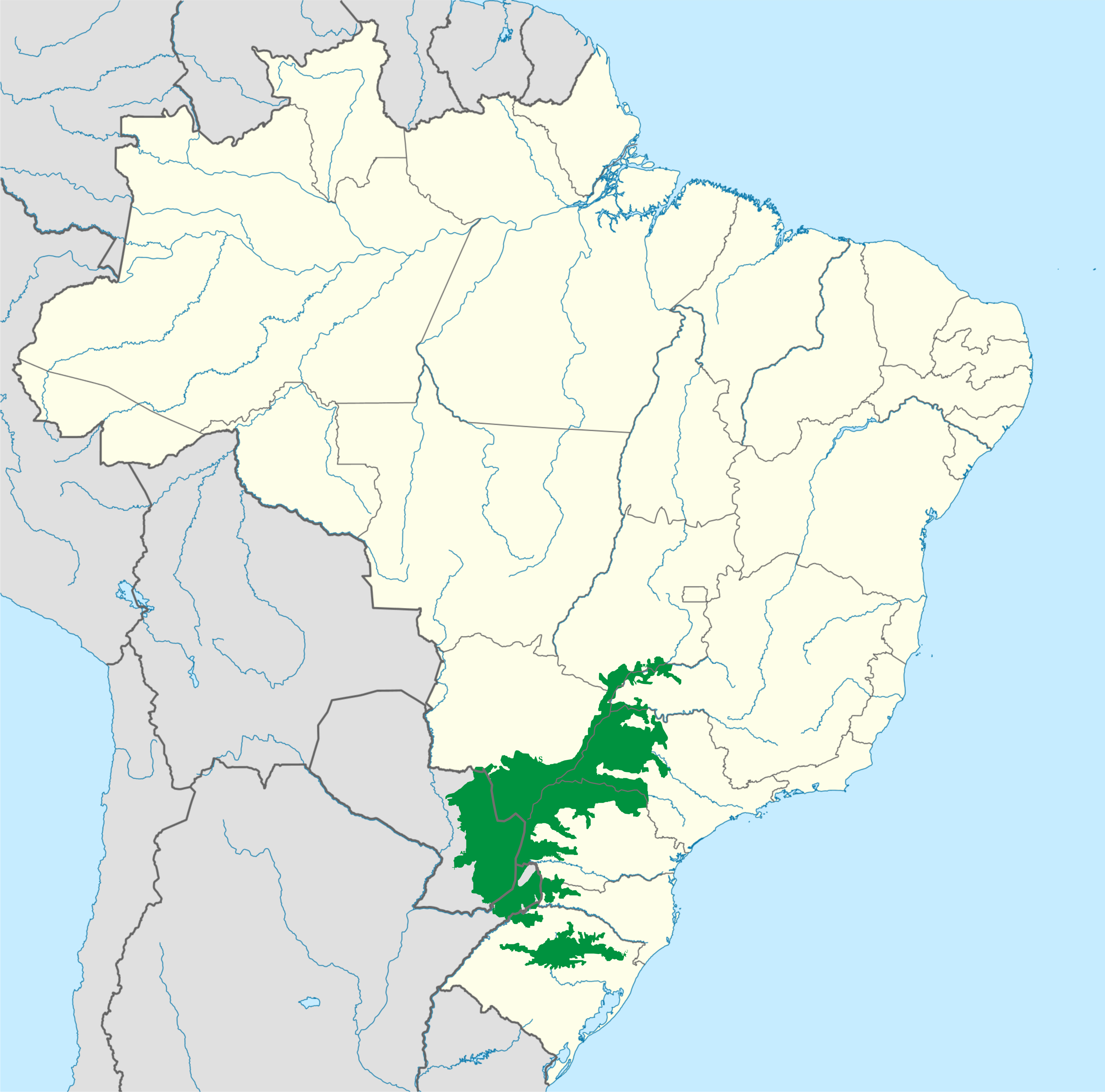
Alto Paraná Atlantic forests

== See also ==
- Administrative divisions of Argentina
- Climatic regions of Argentina

General:

- Geography of Argentina

== Bibliography ==
- Menutti, Adela; Menutti, María (1980). Geografía Argentina y Universal (in Spanish). Buenos Aires: Edil.
