= Mount Kigali =

Hill in Kigali City, Rwanda

Kigali
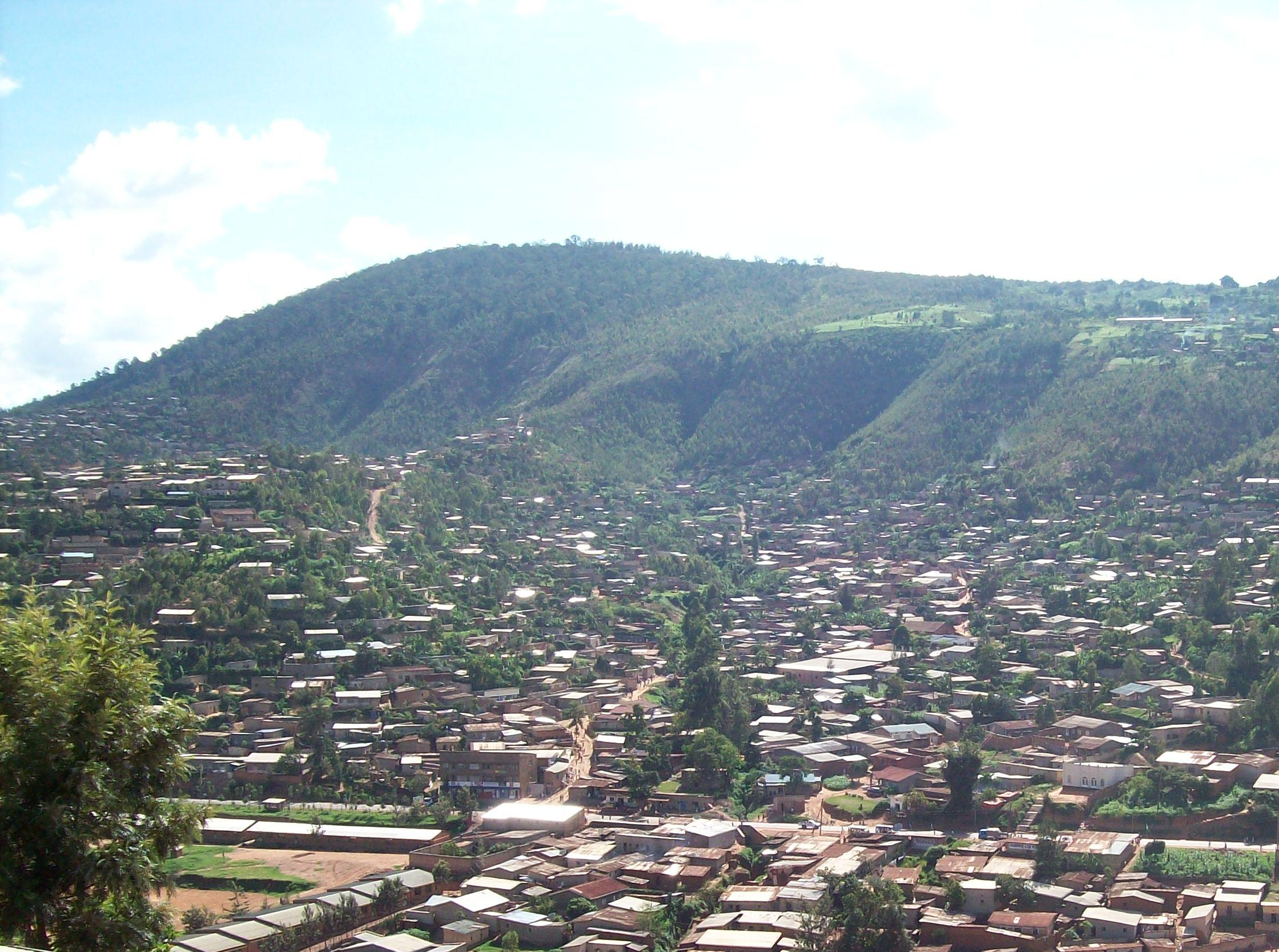
- Kigali viewed from the northeast

Highest point
- Elevation: 1,853 m (6,079 ft)
- Prominence: 400 m (1,300 ft)
- Coordinates: 1°58′01″S 30°02′18″E

Geography
- Location: Rwanda

Mount Kigali, or Mont Kigali in French, is a hill in Kigali City, Rwanda, after which the city was named. Mount Kigali is located west of the city center in Nyarugenge District. The majority of Nyarugenge District is located on the slopes of Mount Kigali. The western slopes of Mount Kigali end in the valley of the river Nyabarongo. At a height of 1,853 metres (6,079 ft), along with the taller Mont Jali at 2,078 metres (6,818 ft) directly to its north, it dominates the other hills in the city, which rise between 1300 and 1600 meters. As a result, Mount Kigali offers expansive views of the entire city of Kigali to the east and north, the Southern Province to the west and south, and the Eastern Province to the east and south. Mount Kigali University is named after the mountain.

== History ==
The history of Mount Kigali goes back to the 14th century AD. Rwandan King Cyilima I Rungwe conquered the mountain and the areas surrounding it and, looking at the sprawling land, said, Burya iki gihugu ni Kigali ("This country is vast").
