= Muhima =

Sector in Rwandan district

- Sector
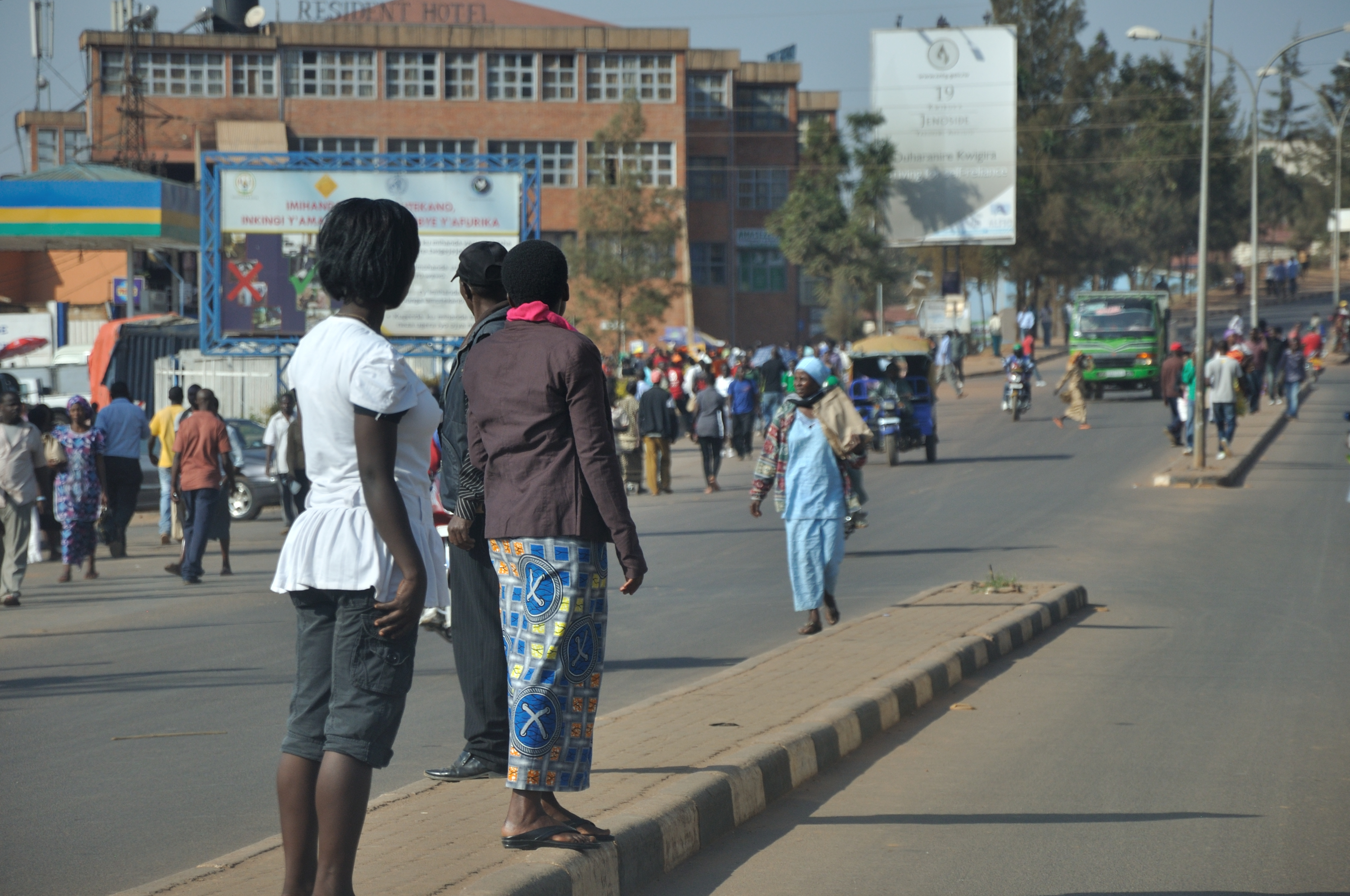

- Location in Rwanda
- Coordinates: 1°56′9″S 30°3′12″E
- Country: Rwanda
- Province: City of Kigali
- District: Nyarugenge

Area
  - Total: 2.944 km^{2} (1.137 sq mi)
- Elevation: 1,495 m (4,905 ft)

Population (2022 census)
  - Total: 22,531
  - Density: 7,653/km^{2} (19,820/sq mi)
- (2022 census)
- Time zone: UTC+2 (CAT)
  - Summer (DST): UTC+2 (not observed)

Muhima is a sector (umurenge) in the City of Kigali, Nyarugenge District, Rwanda. It is located in the west part of the city of Kigali.

== Geography ==
Its northwest border is shaped by the Nyabugogo River and an unnamed tributary of Nyabugogo. It has an elevation of 1495 meters.

== Religion ==
Muhima is home to the Sainte-Famille Catholic church.

== Demographics ==
In 2012, Its population was 29,768 inhabitants, and had a gender ratio of 17,222 males to 12,546 females.

According to the 2022 census, the sector had a total population of 22,531 inhabitants, with the following Gender demographics:

- Males 12,286
- Females 10,245

The Rwanda Environment Management Authority hypothesised that the high male-to-female ratio was due to a tendency for men to migrate to the city in search of work outside the agricultural sector, while their wives remained in a rural home.

As of 2022 it had a 100% Urban rate. It is quite young with 22.1% of the population is under 15 and 75.7% of the population being younger than 65, and older than 14. Only 2.2% of the population is older than 64.

== Transportation ==
The RN 1 and RN 3 runs straight through the middle of Muhima.

== Sectors ==
Nyarugenge District is divided into 10 sectors (imirenge): Gitega, Kanyinya, Kigali, Kimisagara, Mageragere, Muhima, Nyakabanda, Nyamirambo, Nyarugenge and Rwezamenyo.

== Inhabited places ==
Sectors are divided into subdivisions. These are the list of subdivisions.

- Ubumwe
- Rugenge
- Nyabugogo
- Kabeza
- Tetero
- Kabasengerezi
- Amahoro
