= Region (disambiguation) =

Region is a term used by contemporary geographers to describe an area of land or water that is part of a larger whole.

Region or Regional may also refer to:

== Geography ==
- Regional Australia, a term used in Australia for populated regions outside of major cities

== Transportation ==
- RegionsAir, an airline based in the United States
- Regional airline, any airline that services a limited area, or any of several specific regional airlines, including
  - Régional (2001–2013), a defunct airline based in France
  - Regional Airlines (France) (?–2001), a defunct airline based in France
  - Regional Air (Papua New Guinea), an airline based in Papua New Guinea
  - Regional Air (Kenya) (2000–2005), a defunct airline based in Kenya
  - Regional Air (est. 1997), an airline based in Tanzania
  - Rex Airlines, formerly Regional Express Airlines, an airline in Australia
  - Regional 1 (airline) (2003–2019), an airline based in Canada
  - Regional Pacific Airlines, a defunct airline based in Australia

Regional is also the name of at least two rail lines:

- Regional Railways one of the three former passenger sectors of British Rail from 1981 to 1996
- Regional (Amtrak), a train line that runs between Massachusetts and Virginia

== Computer science ==
- Region (model checking), a convex polytope data structure
- Region-based memory management, a memory management technique in which allocations are organized into regions and all objects in a region can be deallocated at once
- In raster graphics, a region is a data structure used to represent an arbitrary set of pixels (in Apple QuickDraw) or series of shapes (Microsoft Windows Graphics Device Interface or X Window System) to be drawn on the screen
- In digital audio editing, a region is a reference to a portion of an audio file

== Mathematics and physics ==
- Region (mathematical analysis), a non-empty, open, connected set

== Corporations ==
- Regions Financial Corporation, a banking and financial services company headquartered in Birmingham, Alabama

== Politics ==
- Region (administrative), a governmental subdivision of a nation
- Region (Europe), a political subdivision within the European Union

== Fiction ==
- Regional novel, see
  - American Literary Regionalism
  - British regional literature

== Media ==
- DVD region code
- Blu-ray Region code
