= Deogratias Mbiku =

Tanzanian priest (1942–2021)

The Reverend Monsignor Deogratias Mbiku
- Catholic chaplain to the University of Dar es Salaam
- Church: Roman Catholic Church
- In office: 1996–2021
- Successor: Henry Rimisho

Orders
- Ordination: 4 August 1971 by Laurean Rugambwa

Personal details
- Born: Deogratias Hukumu Mbiku; 26 August 1942 Kilwa District, Lindi Region, Tanganyika Territory (now Tanzania)
- Died: 4 April 2021 (aged 78) Dar es Salaam, Tanzania
- Denomination: Roman Catholicism
- Education: Kasita junior seminary Nyegezi seminary
- Alma mater: Kibosho Major Seminary; Kipalapala Major Seminary; Pontifical Urbaniana University Rome

Styles of Deogratias Mbiku
- Reference style: The Most Reverend
- Spoken style: Your Excellency
- Religious style: Monsignor

Deogratias Mbiku (1942–2021) was a Tanzanian Roman Catholic priest and monsignor. Latterly he was a Catholic chaplain to the University of Dar-es-Salaam at the City of Dar es Salaam.

== Biography ==
Mbiku was born on 26 August 1942 in Kilwa district, Lindi Region. He is the third among thirteen children of Mr. Hukumu Liwala and Mother Manate Sefu Nakilindo.

Mbiku received his primary and secondary education at Kipatimu School between 1952 and 1958. He received secondary education at Kasita junior seminary and Nyegezi seminary from 1961 to 1966. He enrolled at Kibosho Major Seminary for philosophy studies from 1967 to 1968. He joined Kipalapala Major Seminary for theology studies from 1969 to 1971.

He was ordained a deacon on August 4, 1971, in Msimbazi Parish by the late Rev. Laurian Cardinal Rugambwa, former Archbishop of the Archdiocese of Dar es Salaam. On August 6, 1972, the late His Eminence Laurian Cardinal Rugambwa, former Archbishop of the Archdiocese of Dar es Salaam, ordained him a priest.

In 1977 to 1981 he went for studies in Rome where he was awarded a PhD in philosophy from Urbaniana University. From 1992 to 1996 he was Vice Chancellor of the Catholic University (CUEA) Nairobi Kenya.

He served in several parishes and offices in Dar es Salaam Archdiocese and as a parish priest of Dar es Salaam University Parish for almost 25 years. Mbiku was a prolific writer and author, amongst other publications. In 2014, he wrote a book entitled, "Historia ya jimbo kuu la Dar es Salaam".

== Death and legacy ==
On 4 April 2021, Mbiku died at Cardinal Rugambwa Hospital where he was undergoing treatment of diabetes.
