= Deogratius Jaganyi =

Kenyan Academician

Deogratius Jaganyi
- Occupation: Academician
- Known for: 2nd Vice Chancellor of Mount Kenya University

Academic background
- Education: Imperial College London

Academic work
- Discipline: Physical Chemistry
- Institutions: University of Natal; Mount Kenya University

Deogratius Jaganyi is a Kenyan professor of Physical Chemistry and the current vice chancellor of Mount Kenya University.

== Early life and education ==
Deogratius earned his PhD in Physical Chemistry from the Imperial College of Science, Technology and Medicine, University of London England.

== Career ==
Before joining Mount Kenya University, Jaganyi was a lecturer at the University of Natal in Durban . He served as the Deputy Dean of the Faculty of Science & Agriculture. He was appointed as vice-chancellor of Mount Kenya University in 2021 when he succeeded Prof. Stanley Waudo
