= Skol Brewery =

Largest brewer and soft beverage company in Rwanda

SKOL Brewery Ltd.
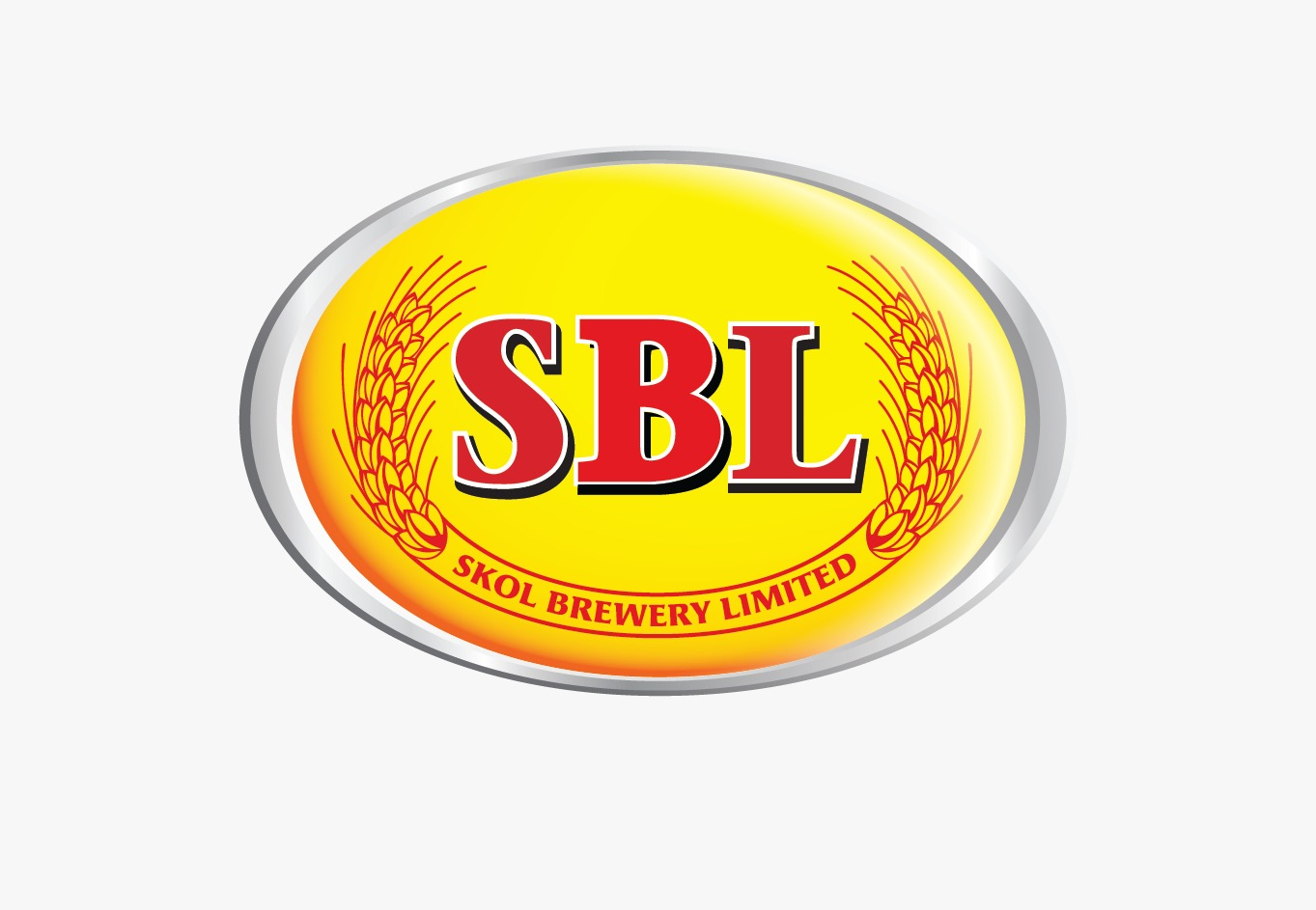
- Industry: Brewing
- Founded: 2009; 17 years ago
- Headquarters: Kigali, Rwanda
- Products: Beer, soft drinks, water
- Revenue: $5 Millions - $25Millions
- Number of employees: 450 – 600
- Parent: Unibra
- Website: Homepage

Skol Brewery Ltd is a Rwandan brewer and soft beverage company founded in 1960. It is a subsidiary of Unibra, a long-standing Belgian family-owned enterprise in the brewery industry, real estate, and financial services sectors. It was established in Rwanda in 2009.

== History ==
Skol Brewery Limited was established in 2009 as a subsidiary of Unibra, A Belgian investment company that has been involved in the African beer industry for several decades. It is located at the edge of the capital city of Rwanda, Kigali. The company has started brewing SKOL MALT as its first product in 2010 Since that first brew Skol has grown to more than 20 percent of the beer market.

In 2011, Skol Brewery Limited introduced its second brand called Skol Lager

In 2012, Unibra bought 49 Percent of the company shares, Since then Unibra has reached 100 Percent of the Company Ownership.

In 2016, Skol Brewery Limited has increased its production capacity by 48 percent.

Currently, Skol Brewery Limited is producing seven Brands in various packaging types, and imports cans from Belgium.

== Products ==
Skol Brewery Limited produces a variety of alcoholic and non-alcoholic beverages including:

Alcoholic drinks

- Skol Malt
- Skol Lager
- Virunga
- Gatanu

Non-Alcoholic Drinks:

- Maltona
- Panache
- Virunga Water

== See also ==
- Economy of Rwanda
