= Deogratius =

Deogratius is a masculine given name. Notable people with the name include:

- Deogratius Jaganyi, professor of physical chemistry at Mount Kenya University
- Deogratius Ndejembi, vice president of Tanzania
