= Mwanaisha Chidzuga =

Kenyan media personality

Mwanaisha Chidzuga is the Deputy government spokesperson of the Government of Kenya. She was appointed on 4 October 2023 by President William Samoei Ruto .

== Education ==
Mwanaisha attended Ziwani Primary School in Matuga, Kwale County and became the very first girl from the area to go to a National School. She then Joined Kenya High School in Nairobi. She later joined Moi University-Nairobi Campus for her degree in BSc. (Communications and Public Relations) and Masters of Science in the same field.

== Career ==
Before becoming a government of Kenya employee, Mwanaisha started in media at Pwani FM, a radio station in Kenya coastal area as a Swahili reporter. She later worked at various media houses such as Media Max`s K24, KTN and Radio 47
