= Mount Kenya University =

Private university in Kenya

Coordinates: 1°02′44″S 37°04′54″E

- Other name: MKU
- Motto: Unlocking Infinite Possibilities
- Type: Private university
- Established: 1996
- Academic affiliations: IUCEA, ACU, UC-USA, NKU-USA
- Vice-Chancellor: Deogratius Jaganyi
- Faculty: 5,000+
- Students: 52,000+ (2015)
- Location: Thika, Kenya
- Colours: Light blue, light orange, and cream
- Website: www.mku.ac.ke
- Location of the university in Kenya

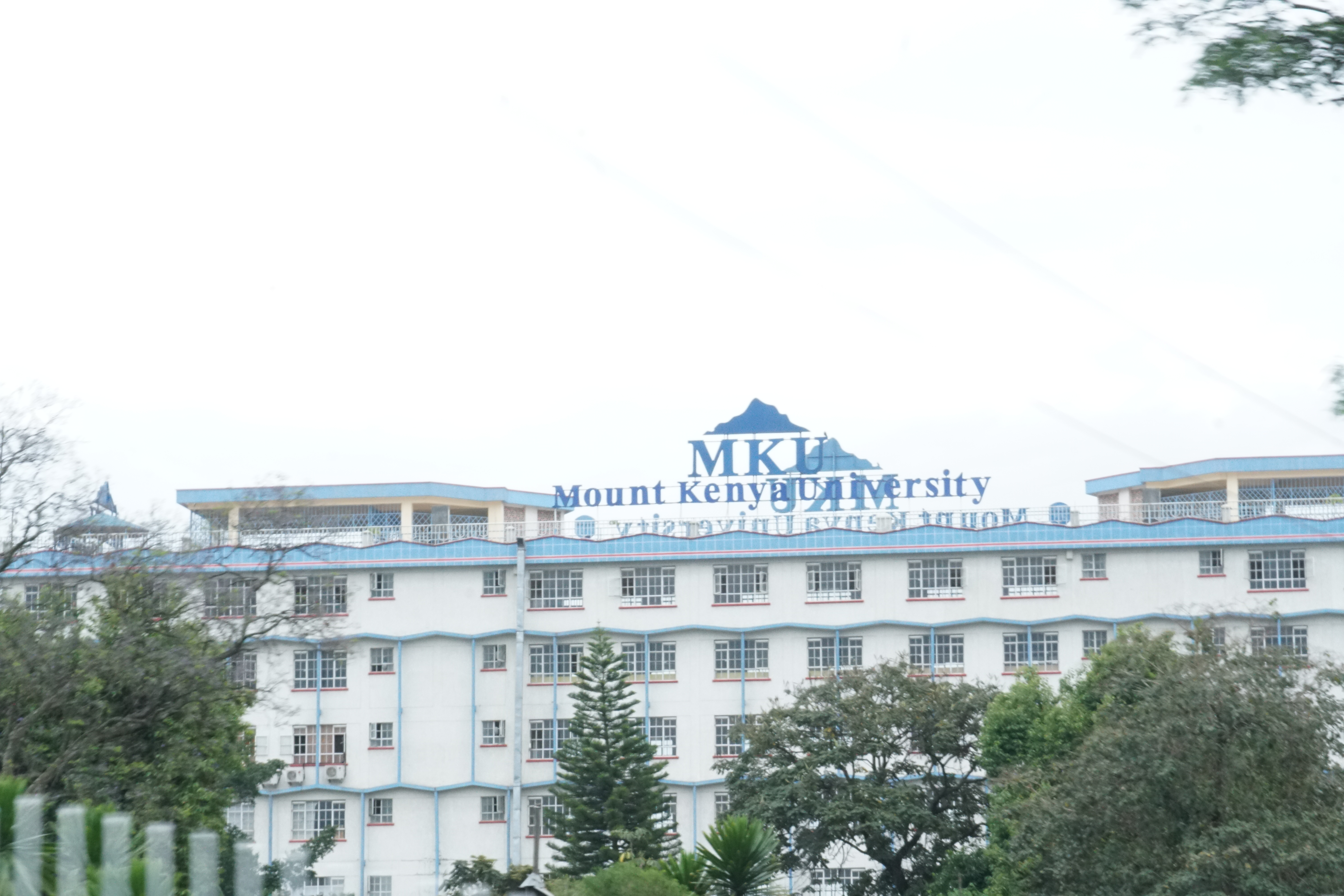
One of the university's campuses in Nakuru

Mount Kenya University (MKU) is a private, multi-campus university in the municipal town of Thika, Kenya.

== History ==
It was established by Prof. Simon N. Gicharu and has become one of the most significant private universities in Kenya. MKU has a student population of 52,000 as of September 2015. MKU is chartered and ISO 9001:2015 certified.

== List of Campuses ==
The main campus of MKU is located in Thika, approximately 47 kilometres (29 mi) by road northeast of Nairobi, the capital and largest city in Kenya. The coordinates of the university's main campus are 1°02'44.0"S, 37°04'54.0"E (-1.045559 37.081669).

The university's currently maintains 14 campuses and centres as of July 2024.

- Thika (Main) Campus
- Mombasa Campus
- Nairobi Campus
- Parklands Law Campus
- Open Distance and Electronic Learning (ODEL) Center - main campus
- Nakuru Campus
- Eldoret Campus
- Meru Campus
- Kigali, Rwanda Campus
- Kampala, Uganda Campus
- MKU, Rwanda Campus

== History ==
The institution was originally known as the Thika Institute of Technology, established in 1996 by Dr. Simon Gicharu. Initially, the institute provided programs focused on management and computer training. In the same year, Kenya's Ministry of Education, Science, and Technology approved the institute as a fully-fledged institution of higher learning.

In 2005, the institute became the first privately owned institution in Kenya to receive authorization to train pharmaceutical technologists from the Pharmacy and Poisons Board of the Kenya Ministry of Health.

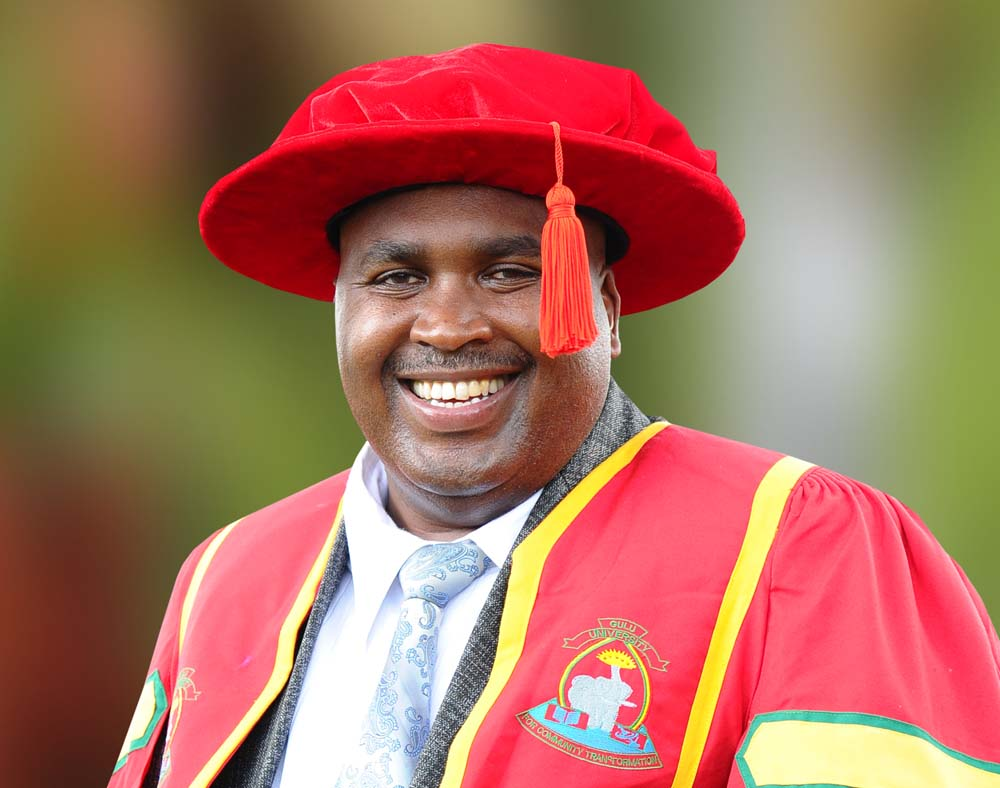
Founder Mt. Kenya University

In 2006 the Commission for Higher Education (CHE), which later changed to Commission for University Education Kenya (CUE), approved the institute's request for collaboration with JKUAT to offer both diploma and degree programs. After fulfilling all the requirements, the Commission for Higher Education authorized MKU to establish a full-fledged privately funded university. In 2011, the university was awarded a charter by the government of Kenya upon the recommendation of the Commission of Higher Education.

In 2023, its former campus in Kigali, Rwanda, became an autonomous university known as Mount Kigali University.

== Academics ==
The university is organized into three colleges, 12 schools, and three institutes:

=== Institutes ===
- Institute of Security Studies, Justice and Ethics
- Institute of Film, Creative and Performing Arts
- Equip Africa Institute

=== Colleges ===
- College of Graduate Studies and Research
- College of Health Sciences
- Equip College of Medical and Health Sciences

=== Schools ===
- College of Health Sciences
  - Medical School
  - School of Pharmacy
  - School of Clinical Medicine
  - School of Nursing
  - School of Public Health
- School of Business and Economics
- School of Education
- School of Engineering, Energy and the Built Environment
- School of Pure and Applied Sciences
- School of Social Sciences
- School of Law
- School of Computing and Informatics

== See also ==
- List of universities in Kenya
- Education in Kenya
