= Sector (administrative division) =

Administrative division of a country

Sector is a name for an administrative division in some countries.

It is used for:

- Sectors of Bucharest
- Sectors of the Democratic Republic of the Congo
- Sectors of Guinea-Bissau
- Sectors of Islamabad
- Sectors of Rwanda
- List of barrios and sectors of Caguas, Puerto Rico

== See also ==
- Sector (disambiguation)
