= Nyarugenge District =

Coordinates: 1°59′S 30°01′E

- District
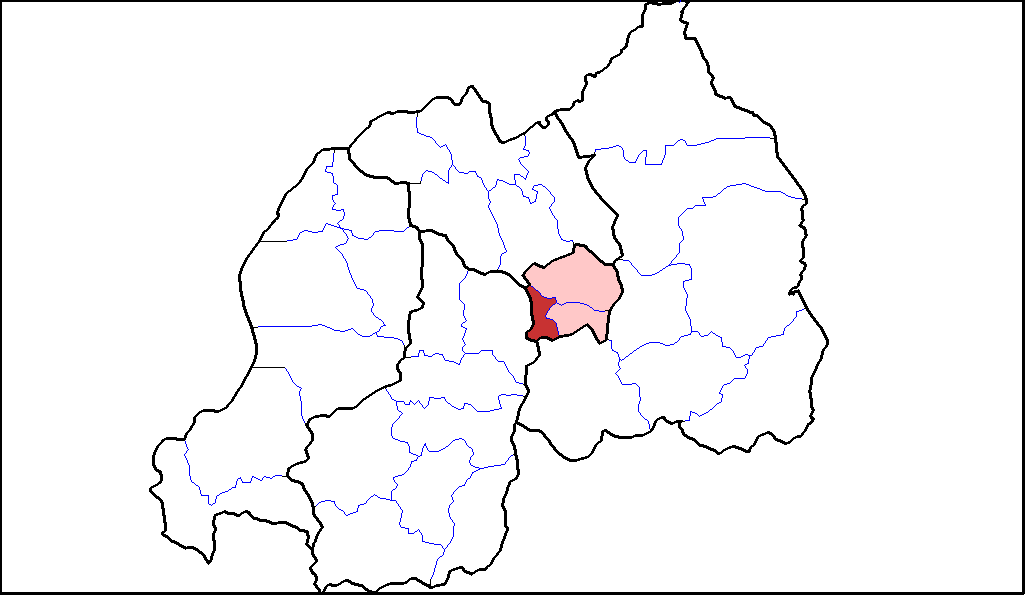
- Shown within the City of Kigali and Rwanda
- Country: Rwanda
- City: Kigali
- Capital: Nyarugenge

Government
  - Executive Administrator: Alexis Ingangare

Area
  - Total: 134 km^{2} (52 sq mi)

Population (2022)
  - Total: 374,319
  - Density: 2,790/km^{2} (7,230/sq mi)
- Website: www.nyarugenge.gov.rw

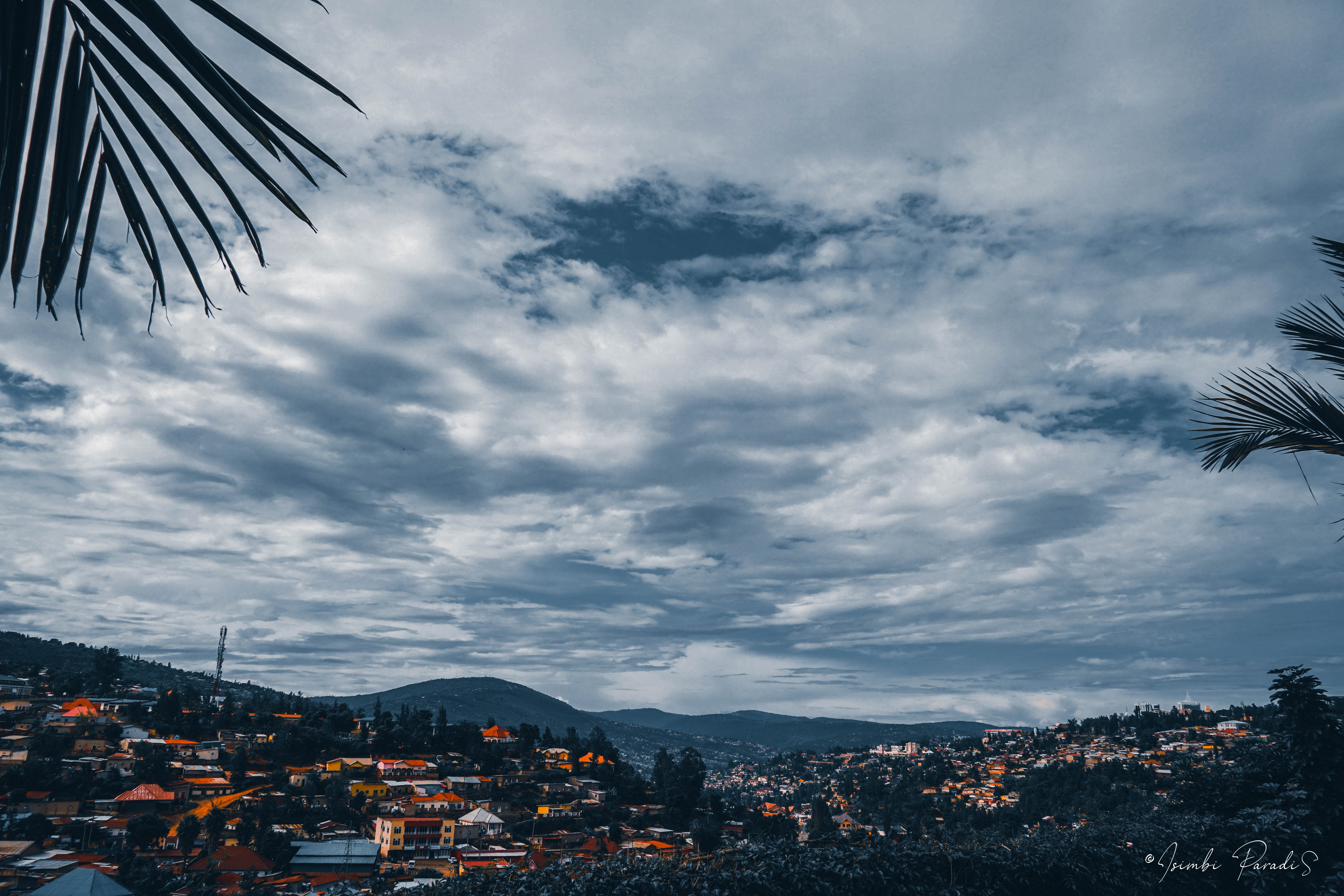
Kigali Hills view

Nyarugenge is a district (akarere) in the City of Kigali, Rwanda. Its heart is the city centre of Kigali (which is towards the west of the urban area and the province), and contains most of the city's businesses.

== Sectors ==
Nyarugenge district is divided into 10 sectors (imirenge): Gitega, Kanyinya, Kigali, Kimisagara, Mageragere, Muhima, Nyakabanda, Nyamirambo, Nyarugenge and Rwezamenyo.

== Population ==
Historical Population of the Nyarugenge District
Year	Population Nyarugenge	Census of Population and Housing
2002	236,990	2002 Rwandan Census
2012	▲284,561	2012 Rwandan Census
2022	▲374,319	2022 Rwandan Census

Sectors of the Nyarugenge District by population according to the 2022 census
N°	Sectors of District Nyarugenge	Census (2022)
1°	Kigali	61,499
2°	Mageregere	59,747
3°	Kimisagara	56,534
4°	Nyamirambo	55,315
5°	Kanyinya	31,026
6°	Nyakabanda	29,580
7°	Gitega	26,668
8°	Muhima	22,531
9°	Nyarugenge	16,665
10°	Rwezamenyo	14,754
Total	Nyarugenge District	374,319

== Education ==
Lycée de Kigali (LDK) is in Kiyovu Cell, Nyarugenge Sector, Nyarugenge District.
