= Administrative divisions of Argentina =

Argentina has the following types of country subdivisions:

== Administrative divisions ==
- Geographical regions of Argentina (6) which are used only traditionally
- Provinces (23, provincia)
- Autonomous city (1, ciudad autónoma)
- Departments / Partidos 376/135
  - The province of Mendoza divides its territory into departments, which are further divided into districts (distritos), which are called sections (secciones) in the Capital Department.
- Municipalities (municipios)
- Village, Town, City
- Neighbourhoods of Buenos Aires (barrios)
- Communes of Buenos Aires (comprise one or more barrios of BsAs.)

== See also ==
- Government of Argentina
