= Nyabugogo River =

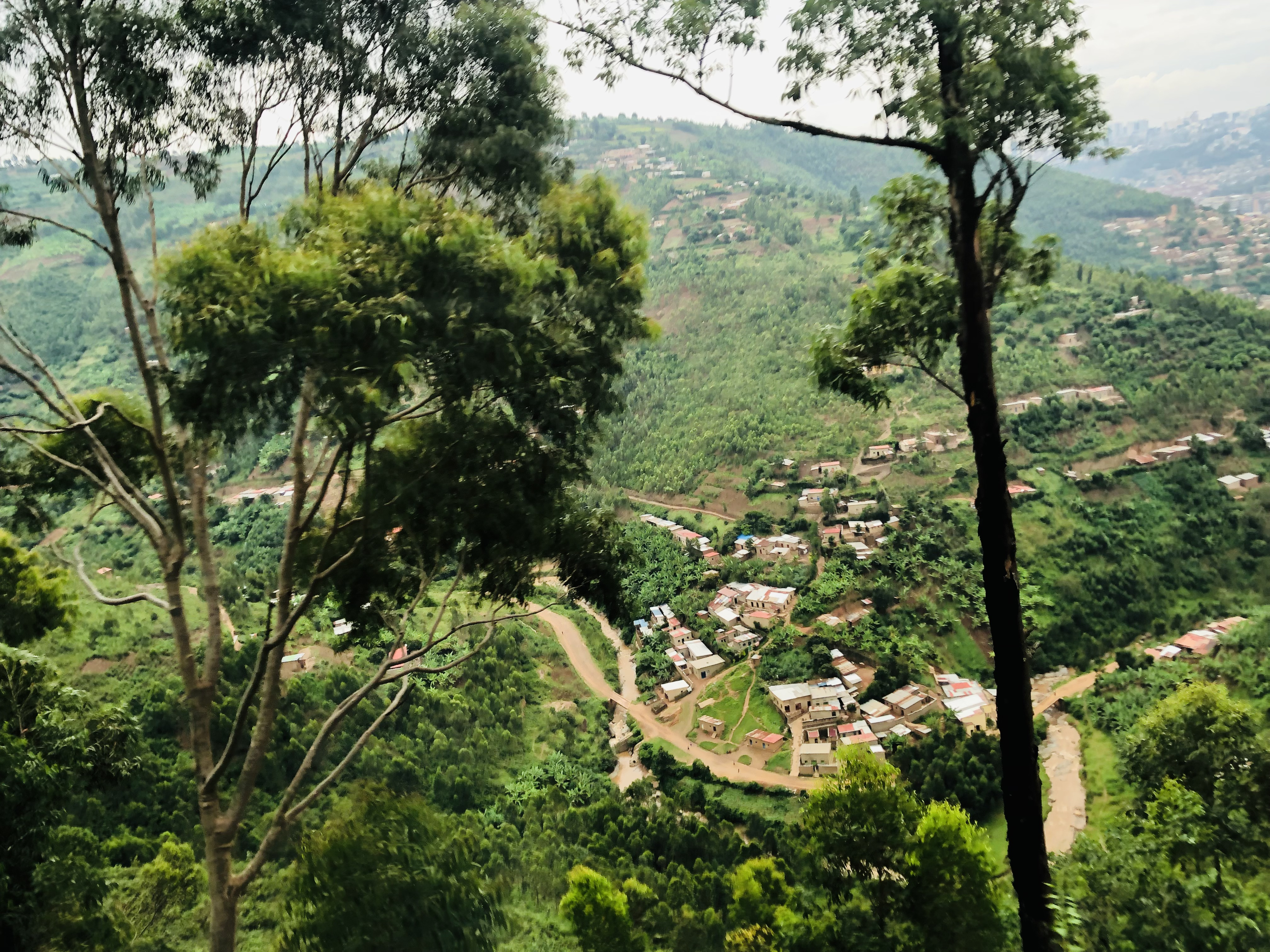

Location
- Country: Rwanda

Physical characteristics
- Mouth
  - coordinates: 1.9494°S 29.9984°E
  - elevation: 1,360 m (4,460 ft)
- Length: 59 km (37 mi)

Basin features
- Tributaries
  - left: Kujevuba River
  - right: Muyanza River, Yanze River, Mwange River, Rusine River

The Nyabugogo River is a river in Rwanda, Africa and tributary to the Nyabarongo River. The source of the river is Lake Muhazi and flows west, forming the northern border between the Northern and Kigali Provinces of Rwanda, in the southern portion of the Nile Basin. It empties into the lower Nyabarongo River as a tributary near Kigali city, the capital of Rwanda. The river has a total length of 59 kilometres (37 mi) and a catchment area of 1,650 square kilometres (640 square miles).

Between 2018 and 2024, a Programme of Measures was developed to improve the river. It included agroforestry, afforestation, and terraces all in an effort to reduce the amount of soil erosion.

== Floods ==
In 2013, the river flooded Kigali, causing millions of francs in damages, and the deaths of four people in a car.
