= List of lakes of Rwanda =

The main lakes within, or bordered by, Rwanda are as follows:

== Lakes ==
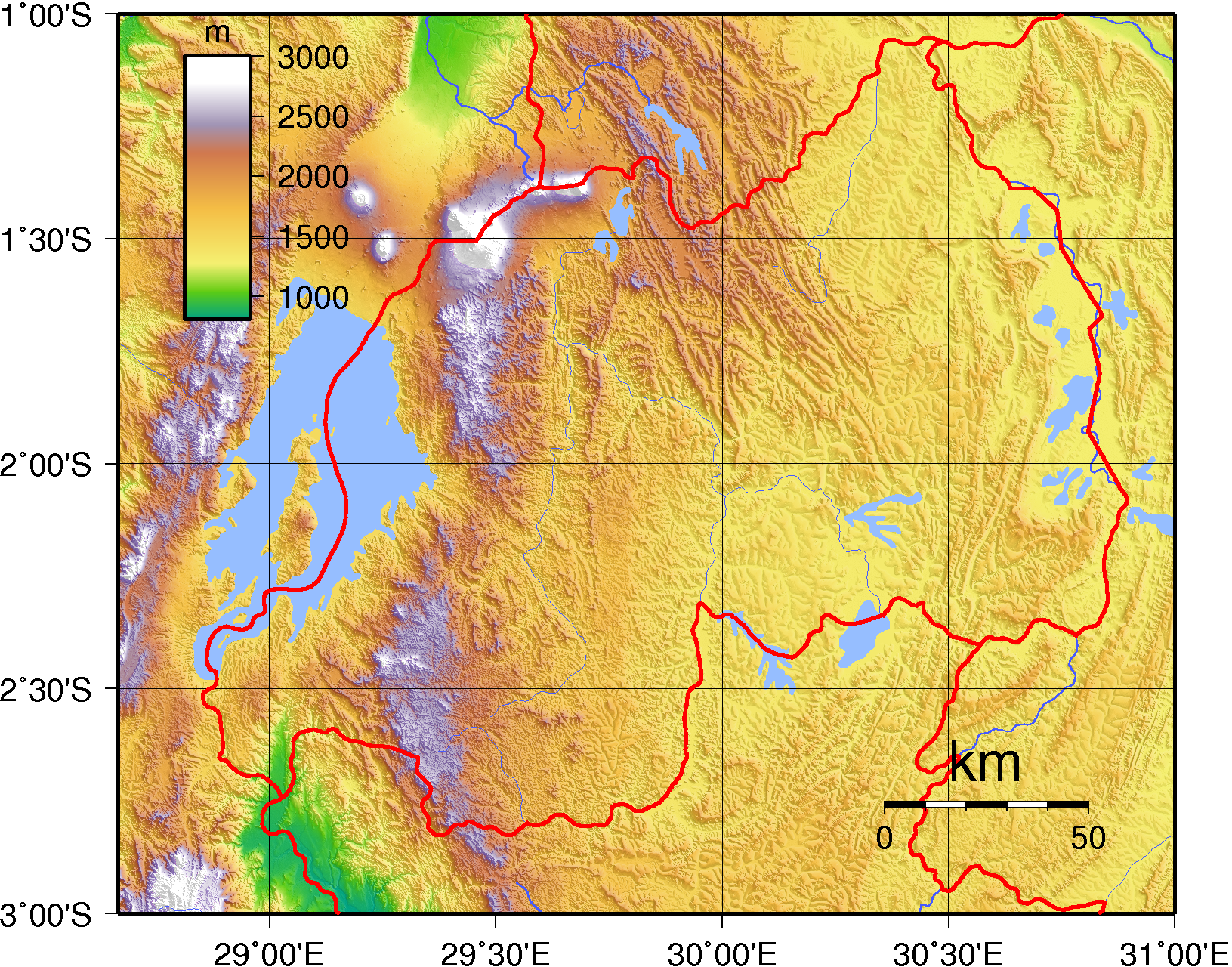
A topographic map of Rwanda showing some of the lakes. Lake Muhazi is apparently too narrow to show up on this map.

- Lake Kivu, between Rwanda and the Democratic Republic of Congo to the west, is by far the largest
- Lake Muhazi, about twenty kilometres east of Kigali: a long, narrow lake running roughly east–west and extending north and south into a number of tributary valleys
- Lake Ihema, in the Akagera National Park in the far east of the country, by the border with Tanzania
- Lake Rweru in the south-east, which is shared with Burundi
- Lake Burera, a mountain lake in the north (1862 metres above sea level)
- Lake Ruhondo, just to the south of Lake Burera, separated from it by a spine of hills
- Lake Mugesera, about 30 km south-east of Kigali, is a narrow lake consisting of five east–west bays joined at the western side
- Lake Rugwero, in the south-east, shared with Burundi, lying between Lake Rweru and Lake Cohoha
- Lake Cohoha South, south of Bugesera District on the border with Burundi
- Lake Cyohoha North, in Bugesera District
- Lake Sake, in Ngoma District
- Lake Karago, in Nyabihu District, a small lake in the western highlands at an elevation of approximately 2,285 metres

== Nyabarongo wetland lakes ==
A complex of shallow lakes lies in the flat, swampy valley of the Nyabarongo River between Lake Mugesera and Lake Rweru, within a floodplain roughly 35 kilometres wide. Lake Mugesera is the largest lake in this complex, lying on the east bank of the river:

- Lake Birira, on the left (east) bank of the Nyabarongo
- Lake Kilimbi, on the right (west) bank of the Nyabarongo
- Lake Rumira, on the right bank of the Nyabarongo
- Lake Gaharwa, on the right bank of the Nyabarongo
- Lake Kidogo, on the right bank of the Nyabarongo
- Lake Mirayi, on the right bank of the Nyabarongo
- Lake Gashanga, on the right bank of the Nyabarongo
- Lake Kanzigiri, on the right bank of the Nyabarongo, near the Burundi border

== Akagera lakes ==
A series of lakes lie within or near Akagera National Park and the Kagera River basin in the Eastern Province:

- Lake Rwanyakazinga, the largest lake within Akagera National Park, with a surface area of 19.6 km²
- Lake Hago, a smaller lake within the park's central-eastern wetland complex, hydrologically linked to neighbouring lakes and papyrus swamps
- Lake Kivumba, within the Akagera lake chain, connected to the broader Kagera basin floodplain system
- Lake Gishanju, part of the park's interconnected shallow lakes and marsh habitats that support waterbirds and other wildlife
- Lake Mihindi, within Akagera National Park, at an elevation of 1,282 metres
- Lake Shakani, within Akagera National Park
- Lake Birengero, within Akagera National Park
- Lake Cyambwe, in Kayonza District, fed by the Kagera River; also known as Lake Rwehikama
- Lake Nasho, in the eastern part of the country
- Lake Mpanga, in Kirehe District, also known as Lake Rwampanga

== Volcanic lakes ==
Several volcanic crater lakes are found in the Virunga Mountains in the north-west of the country, within Volcanoes National Park:

- Bisoke Crater Lake, at the summit of Mount Bisoke (3,711 metres above sea level), approximately 400 metres in diameter and 100 metres deep
- Lake Ngezi, a small, shallow crater lake in a volcanic depression at the foot of Mount Bisoke, formed by an eruption in 1957
