= Lake Mpanga =

Lake in eastern Rwanda

- Lake Rwampanga
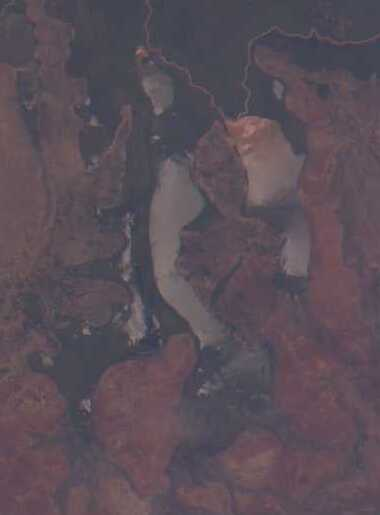
- Lake Mpanga (right), Nasho (left) and Lake Cyambwe (centre) and the Kagera River in February 2006
- Interactive map of Lake Mpanga
- Location: Mpanga, Kirehe District, Eastern Province, Rwanda
- Coordinates: 2.046°S 30.812°E
- Basin countries: Rwanda
- Max. length: 7.0 km (4.3 mi)
- Max. width: 2.2 km (1.4 mi)
- Surface area: 9.5 km^{2} (3.7 sq mi)
- Average depth: 5.2 m (17 ft)
- Max. depth: 7.0 m (23.0 ft)
- Water volume: 32,600,000 m^{3} (26,400 acre⋅ft)
- Surface elevation: 1,289 m (4,229 ft)

Lake Mpanga is a lake in the Mpanga sector of Kirehe District in the Eastern Province of Rwanda. It lies within the Kagera River basin and has a surface area of 9.5 square kilometres.

== Geography ==
Lake Mpanga has an area of 9.5 km² and a perimeter of 17.5 km. It is approximately 7 km long and 2.2 km wide. The mean depth is 5.2 m, with a maximum depth of 7.0 m and a volume of approximately 32,600,000 m³. The lake sits at an elevation of approximately 1,289 m (4,229 ft) above sea level. To the north-west lies Lake Cyambwe. To the south-east runs NR25 (National Route 25).

=== Physical characteristics ===
Water temperatures range from 22 to 25 °C at the surface and 22 to 23 °C at the bottom. The pH lies between 7.72 at the water surface and 7.05 at the bottom. These measurements derive from a 1990 Food and Agriculture Organization survey; no more recent physico-chemical data for Lake Mpanga have been identified.

== Economy ==
The lake is used for artisanal fishing. In 1975, the annual catch was approximately 30 tonnes. This figure is drawn from a 1990 Food and Agriculture Organization source reporting data collected in 1975; no more recent fishery-specific statistics for Lake Mpanga have been identified.

== See also ==
- List of lakes in Rwanda
- Lake Nasho
- Lake Cyambwe
- Akagera National Park
- Geography of Rwanda
