= Lake Sake =

Lake in Rwanda

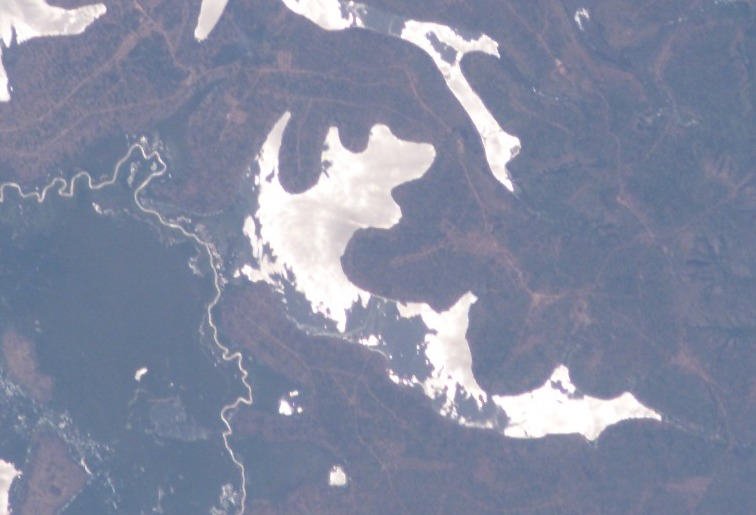
- Satellite view of Lake Sake
- Interactive map of Lake Sake
- Location: Ngoma District, Eastern Province, Rwanda
- Coordinates: 2.237724°S 30.369301°E
- Type: Freshwater lake
- Basin countries: Rwanda
- Max. depth: 4.3 m (14 ft)
- Surface elevation: 1,326 m (4,350 ft)
- Settlements: Sake, Rukumberi

Lake Sake is a lake in Rwanda, located in the south of the Eastern Province. It is named after the town of Sake.

The lake is situated in Ngoma District at an elevation of 1,326 metres (4,350 ft) above sea level. Lake Sake is part of the broader lake system in Rwanda's Eastern Province, which includes nearby lakes such as Lake Mugesera and Lake Rweru.

The lake is located near the town of Sake, which had a population of 28,822 as of the 2022 census.

== See also ==
- List of lakes in Rwanda
