= Lake Cyambwe =

Lake in Eastern Province, Rwanda

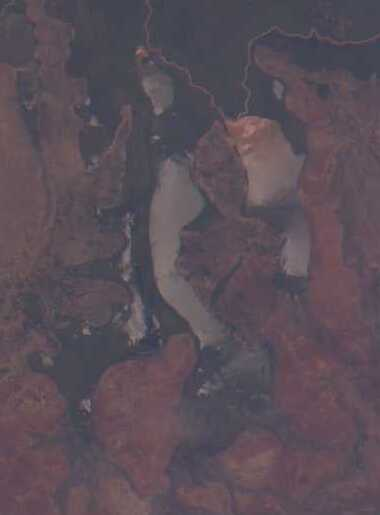
- Satellite view of Lake Nasho, Cyambwe and Mpanga
- Interactive map of Lake Cyambwe
- Location: Kayonza District, Eastern Province, Rwanda
- Coordinates: 2.0303°S 30.7844°E
- Type: Lake
- Primary inflows: Kagera River
- Basin countries: Rwanda
- Surface area: 22.6 km^{2} (5,600 acres)
- Surface elevation: 1,286 m (4,219 ft)

Lake Cyambwe (also known as Lake Rwehikama) is a lake located in the Eastern Province of Rwanda, within Kayonza District, near the locality of Rwamatare. The lake has a surface area of 22.6 km² and lies at an elevation of approximately 1,286 metres above sea level.Its length has been reported as approximately 38.59 kilometres.

== Geography ==
Lake Cyambwe is situated in Kayonza District in the Eastern Province of Rwanda, near the locality of Rwamatare. The lake lies at an elevation of approximately 1,286 metres above sea level, as recorded by digital elevation model data. It forms part of the Akagera wetland complex, positioned within the group of lakes that includes the neighbouring Lake Nasho and Lake Mpanga. The ETI Mpanga irrigation scheme is hydrographically situated between Lake Mpanga and Lake Cyambwe, and is also bounded by the Akagera River.

== Ecology and use ==
Lake Cyambwe is grouped within the Nasho Basin lakes, alongside Nasho, Mpanga, Kagese, and Rwakibare. Together with other lakes in the lower Akagera system, the lake constitutes an important fishing area in Rwanda, with notable catch yields recorded alongside lakes Ihema, Rwanyakizinga, Mihindi, Nasho, and Rwampanga.

== See also ==
- Geography of Rwanda
- Lake Nasho
- Akagera National Park
- List of lakes in Rwanda
