= Lake Rwanyakazinga =

Lake in Akagera National Park, Rwanda

- Lake Rwanyakizinga
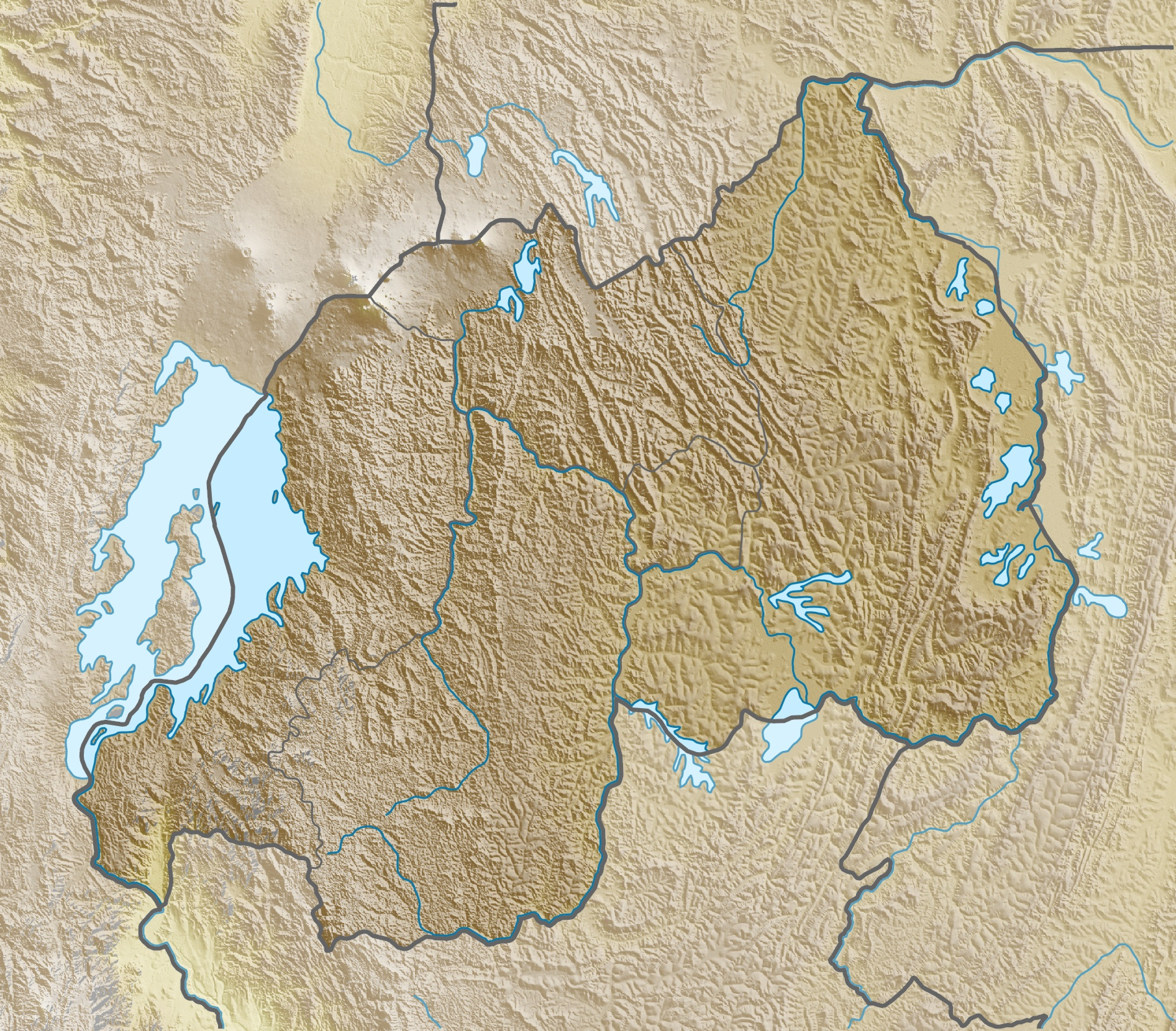
- Location in Rwanda
- Interactive map of Lake Rwanyakazinga
- Location: Akagera National Park, Eastern Province
- Coordinates: 1.46361°S 30.66755°E
- Type: Freshwater lake
- Basin countries: Rwanda
- Max. length: 10.3 km (6.4 mi)
- Max. width: 4.3 km (2.7 mi)
- Surface area: 19.6 km^{2} (7.6 sq mi)
- Average depth: 2.6 m (8.5 ft)
- Max. depth: 4.3 m (14 ft)
- Water volume: 42,300,000 m^{3} (34,300 acre⋅ft)
- Shore length^{1}: 43.7 km (27.2 mi)
- Surface elevation: 1,442 m (4,731 ft)
- ^{1} Shore length is not a well-defined measure.

Lake Rwanyakazinga (also known as Lake Rwanyakizinga) is a lake in Rwanda situated within Akagera National Park, straddling both Nyagatare District and Gatsibo District in Eastern Province. Covering 19.6 km², it lies at an elevation of 1,442 metres and forms part of one of East-central Africa's largest protected wetland systems. The lake is a significant wildlife habitat, supporting hippopotamuses, Nile crocodiles, and diverse birdlife, and its shores and papyrus fringes are visited by a wide range of large mammals typical of the national park.

== Geography ==
Lake Rwanyakazinga has an area of 19.6 km² with a circumference of 43.7 km. It has an elongated shape in a south-west–north-east direction, with a maximum length of 10.3 km and a maximum width of 4.3 km. The maximum depth of Lake Rwanyakazinga is 4.3 m. The northern side belongs to the Karangazi sector of Nyagatare District, whilst the southern side lies in the Rwimbogo sector of Gatsibo District.

To the south-east of Lake Rwanyakazinga lies Lake Mihindi. Both are part of a group of lakes situated on the other side of the Kagera River and in the Akagera marshes. However, most of the lakes are not permanently connected to the Kagera River. This occurs during the rainy season, which takes place twice a year, and many small seasonal streams also flow into the lakes at this time. The water level therefore varies by approximately 1 to 1.5 metres. Total annual rainfall in the region is 650 to 900 mm.

A 2017 study mapping the Akagera wetland found that, while several lakes in the system had been shrinking in extent, Lake Rwanyakazinga experienced a degree of expansion between the study periods examined.

== Flora and fauna ==
Lake Rwanyakazinga is home to hippopotamuses and Nile crocodiles; turtles and amphibians are also common in the lake and its environs. Akagera National Park supports a wide array of mammal species, and animals such as elephants, buffaloes, zebras, waterbucks, southern reedbucks, Grimm's duikers, roan antelopes, impalas, warthogs, and leopards frequent the lake's shores.

The papyrus fringe habitat of the lake supports notable bird species, including the papyrus gonolek and African fish eagle. The Avibase checklist for Akagera National Park records 503 species in the park as a whole.

Tilapia and catfish are the principal fish species recorded in the Akagera lakes system, including Lake Rwanyakazinga.

== Fishing ==
Fishing is practised on the lake. Tilapia and catfish are the commercially relevant species caught in the Akagera lakes, including Lake Rwanyakazinga. The Food and Agriculture Organization has documented concern about fish stock depletion across all of the Akagera National Park lakes.

== See also ==
- List of lakes in Rwanda
- Akagera National Park
- Geography of Rwanda
