= Lake Birira =

Lake in Eastern Province, Rwanda

- Lake Bilira, Lake Birara
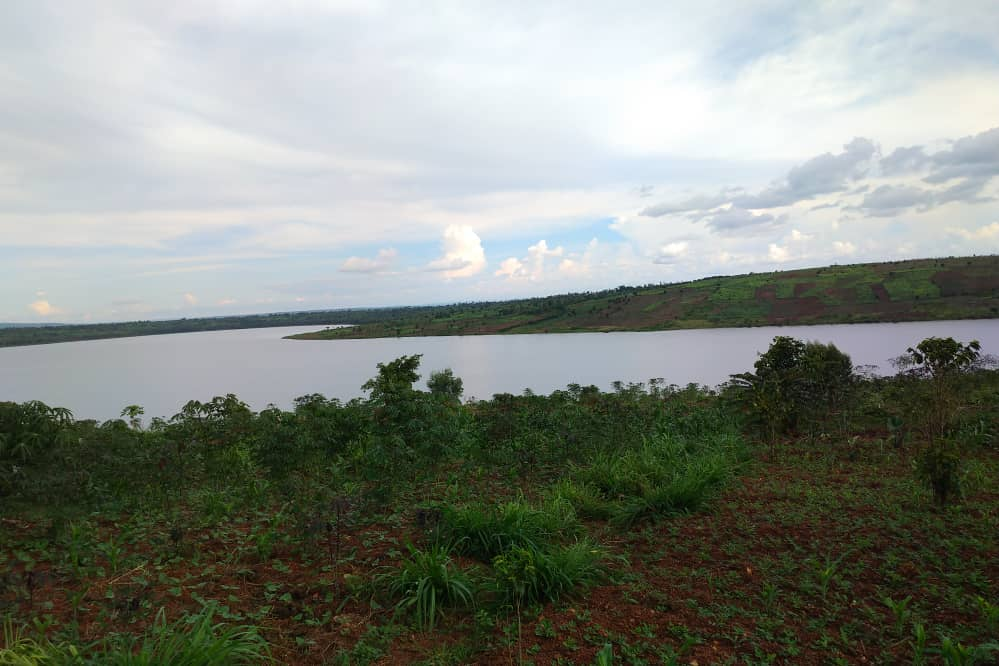
- Interactive map of Lake Birira
- Location: Eastern Province, Rwanda
- Group: Upper Kagera Lakes Complex
- Coordinates: 2.175°S 30.2947°E
- Type: Natural lake
- Part of: Upper Kagera Lakes Complex
- Basin countries: Rwanda
- Surface area: 5.4 km^{2} (2.1 sq mi)
- Average depth: 6.0 m (19.7 ft)
- Max. depth: 6 m (20 ft)
- Surface elevation: 1,350 m (4,430 ft)

Lake Birira (also known as Lake Birara or Lake Bilira) is a lake in Rwanda, located in the Eastern Province and Ngoma District. The lake is also known as Lac Bilira in some sources.

== Geography ==
Lake Birira is part of the Upper Kagera Lakes Complex, a group of lakes distributed across Rwanda and Burundi. The complex includes other lakes such as Gaharwa and Gashanga in Rwanda, and Ingitamo, Kacamurinda, Kanzigiri, Lirwihinda, and Rungazi in Burundi.

The lake is situated at an elevation of 1,350 meters above sea level and forms part of the broader Kagera River basin system.

== See also ==
- Geography of Rwanda
- List of lakes in Rwanda
- Bibliography van den Bossche, J.-P.; Bernacsek, G. M. (1991). "Lake Birira". Source book for the inland fishery resources of Africa. Vol. 1. Rome: FAO. p. 178. ISBN 92-5-102983-0.
