= Lake Cyohoha North =

Lake in Bugesera District, Eastern Province, Rwanda

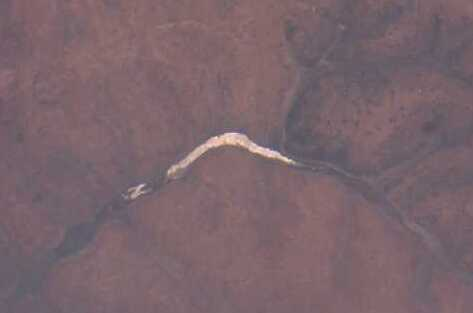
- Satellite view of Lake Cyohoha North
- Interactive map of Lake Cyohoha North
- Coordinates: 2.239°S 30.112°E
- Basin countries: Rwanda
- Max. length: 10.44 km (6.49 mi)
- Surface area: 0.56 km^{2} (0.22 sq mi)
- Surface elevation: 1,344 m (4,409 ft)

Lake Cyohoha North also known as Lake Cyohoha is located in Bugesera District, in the Eastern Province of Rwanda.

== Geography ==
Lake Cyohoha North is situated north of Lake Cyohoha South (Lake Cohoha). Water flows into the lake from the Murago Wetlands and flows westward into the Akanyaru River.

However, the water surface of Lake Cyohoha North has decreased considerably, so that it has been practically dry since the beginning of 2000. The remaining water surface is 0.56 km². Previously, during floods, it was 12 km². The shallow lake was 12 km long and about 1 km wide.

== Flora and fauna ==
Invasive plant species found in the lake include hornwort (Ceratophyllum demersum), curled pondweed (Potamogeton crispus) and the star lotus (Nymphaea nouchali). Water hyacinth has also posed significant environmental challenges in the lake, impacting fishing activities and water quantity.

The fish fauna includes tilapia, African sharptooth catfish and African lungfish.

== Environmental restoration ==
Between 2014 and 2018, the Rwanda Environment Management Authority (REMA) implemented a water hyacinth removal project that targeted 126 hectares of the lake during its first phase. This restoration effort was part of broader initiatives to address invasive aquatic plants that were suffocating freshwater ecosystems across Rwanda.

The lake has been subject to transboundary cooperation projects with Burundi focused on lake restoration and climate resilience, recognising its cross-border ecological significance.

Recent water quality assessment studies have been conducted to evaluate the environmental health of the lake and other wetlands in eastern Rwanda.

== See also ==
- List of lakes in Rwanda
