= Burera District =

Coordinates: 1.4905°S 29.8104°E

- District
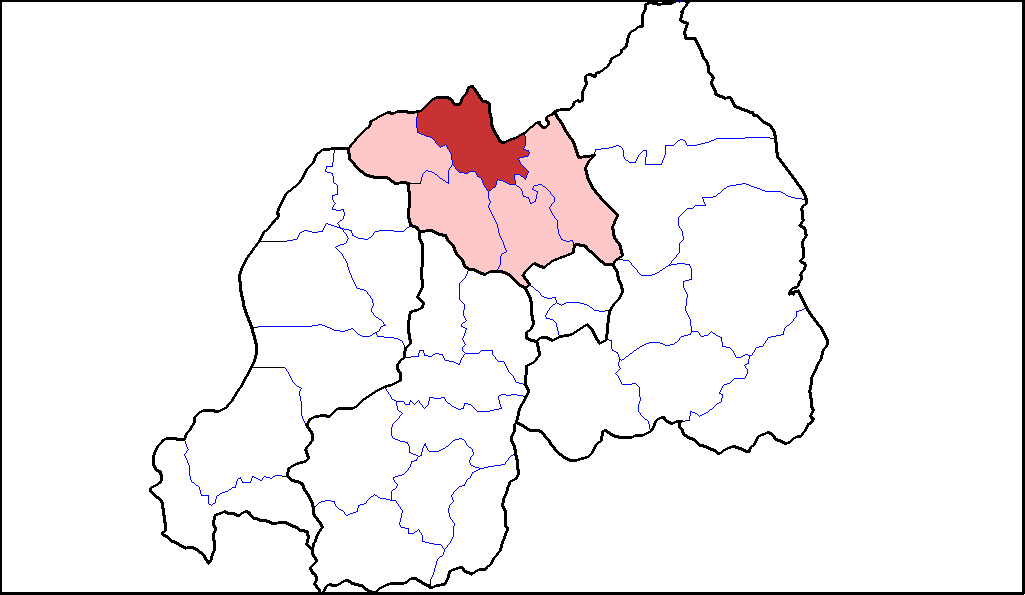
- Shown within Northern Province and Rwanda
- Country: Rwanda
- Province: Northern
- Capital: Rusarabuge

Area
  - District: 644.5 km^{2} (248.8 sq mi)

Population (2022 census)
  - District: 387,729
  - Density: 601.6/km^{2} (1,558/sq mi)
  - Urban: 38,442
  - Rural: 349,287

Burera (Kinyarwanda pronunciation) is a district (Akarere) in Northern Province, Rwanda. Its capital is Cyeru.

== Geography and tourism ==
The district lies in the northern part of Rwanda, adjacent to the Ugandan border, and between the cities of Ruhengeri and Byumba. It is home to Lakes Burera and Ruhondo, and the Virunga Lodge hotel, which lies between them, commanding views of the lakes and the nearby Virunga Mountains, making it one of Rwanda's tourist spots. The district also contains the Cyanika border post, gateway to Kisoro and southwestern Uganda.

Burera district is known for its famous cancer hospital in Butaro sector and the only hospital in Burera district sponsored by Partners in Health.

== Sectors ==
Burera district is divided into 17 sectors (imirenge): Bungwe, Butaro, Cyanika, Cyeru, Gahunga, Gatebe, Gitovu, Kagogo, Kinoni, Kinyababa, Kivuye (Kinyarwanda pronunciation), Nemba, Rugarama, Rugendabari, Ruhunde, Rusarabuye and Rwerere.

== Sources ==
- "Districts of Rwanda". Statoids.
- Inzego.doc — Province, District and Sector information from MINALOC, the Rwanda ministry of local government.
- ; Official website of Burera District, Northern Province of Rwanda.
