= Cyanika =

Rwandan town

- Village and sector
- Location of Cyanika in Rwanda
- Coordinates: 01°20′40″S 29°44′32″E
- Country: Rwanda
- Province: Northern Province
- District: Burera District

Area
  - Village and sector: 40 km^{2} (15 sq mi)
- Elevation: 1,957 m (6,421 ft)

Population (2022 census)
  - Village and sector: 44,510
  - Density: 1,100/km^{2} (2,900/sq mi)
  - Urban: 8,881
- Time zone: UTC+2 (CAT)

Cyanika Sector

Cyanika is a village in Rwanda. It sits adjacent to Kyanika, across the international border with neighboring Uganda. Cyanika, also refers to Cyanika Sector, one of the 17 administrative divisions of Burera District.

== Location ==
Cyanika is located in Cyanika Sector, Burera District, Northern Province, approximately 121 kilometres (75 mi), by road, north-west of Kigali, the capital and largest city of Rwanda. The geographical coordinates of Cyanika, Burera District, Rwanda are: 1°20'40.0"S, 29°44'32.0"E (Latitude:-1.344444; Longitude:29.742222). Cyanika sits at an average elevation of 1,957 metres (6,421 ft), above sea level.

== Overview ==
Cyanika/Kyanika is one of the three major road crossings between Rwanda to the south and Uganda to the north. The other to are Gatuna/Katuna and Kagitumba/Mirama Hills.

In February 2019, Rwanda closed its borders to Ugandans and Ugandan goods, including at the Chanika/Kyanika border crossing. As a result, the annual trade worth approximately US$180 million to Uganda and about US$10 million to Rwanda came to a halt. As of February 2020, attempts by the presidents of Angola, João Lourenço and of the Democratic Republic of the Congo, Félix Tshisekedi, have not yet resolved the impasse.

== Points of interest ==
The border crossing is in close proximity to Volcanoes National Park in Rwanda, Mgahinga Gorilla National Park in Uganda, and Virunga National Park, in the Democratic Republic of the Congo.
