= Lake Mihindi =

Lake in eastern Rwanda

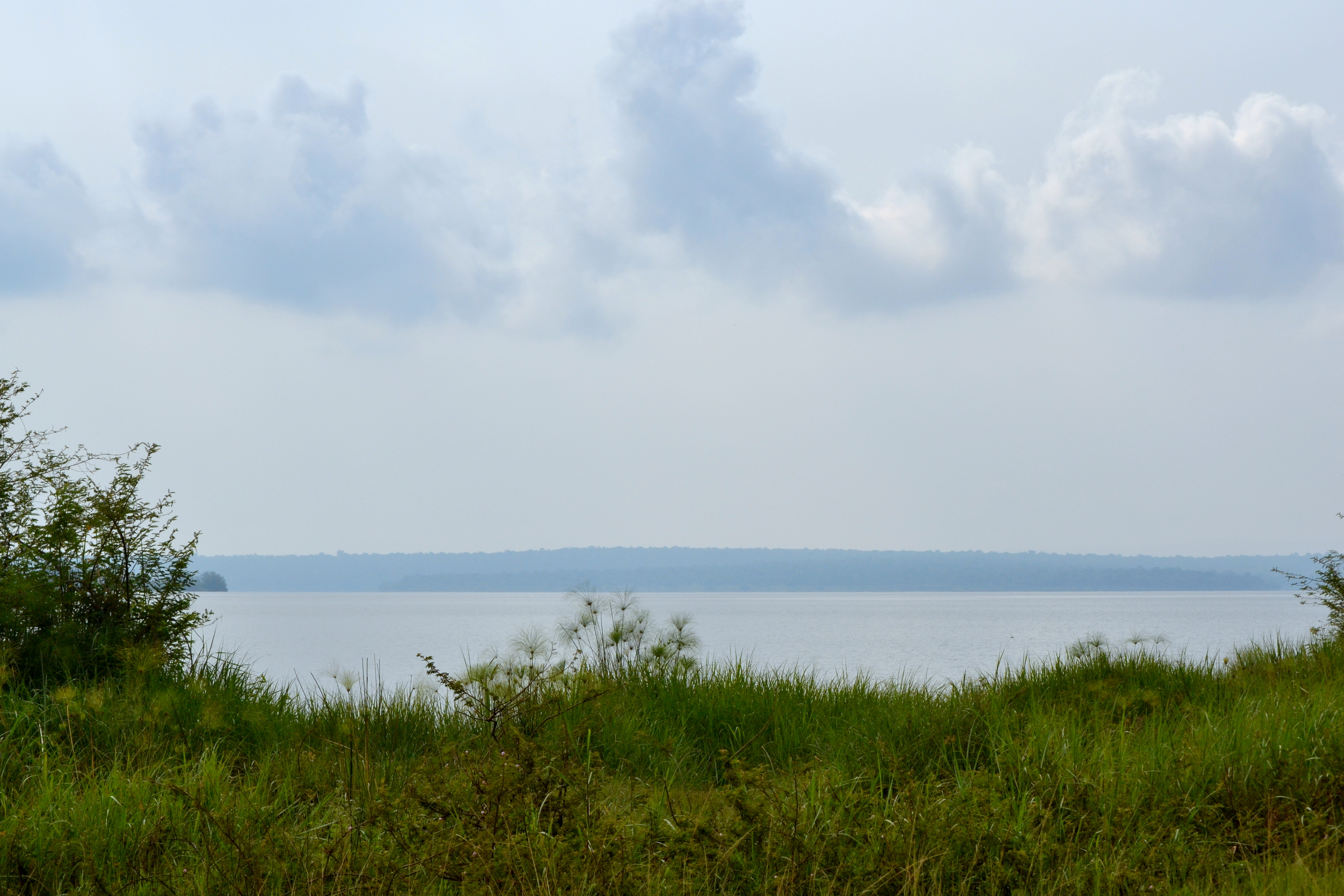
- View from the shores of the lake

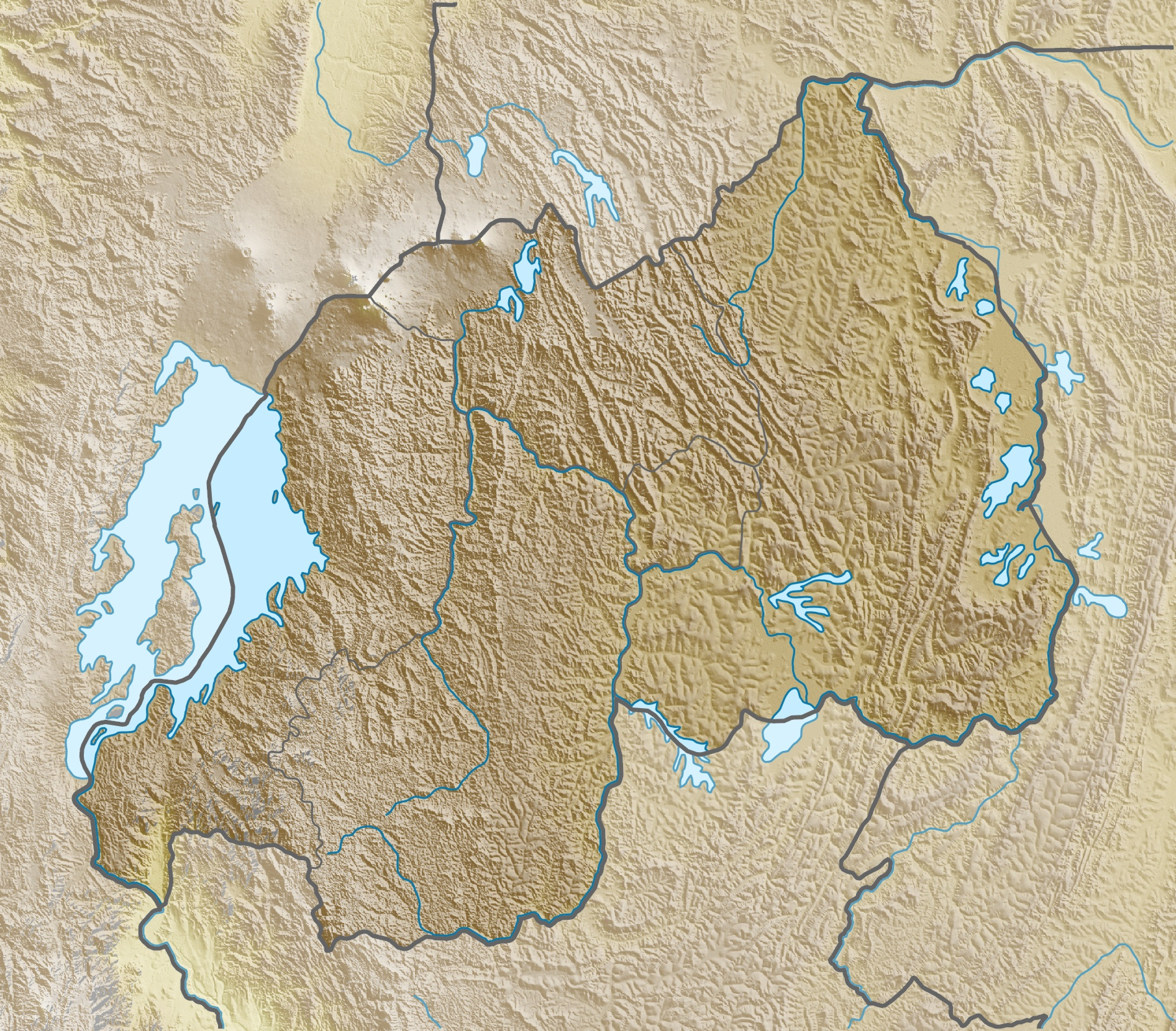
- Location in Rwanda
- Interactive map of Lake Mihindi
- Location: Akagera National Park, Eastern Province
- Coordinates: 1.524°S 30.718°E
- Type: Freshwater lake
- Basin countries: Rwanda
- Surface elevation: 1,282 m (4,206 ft)

Lake Mihindi is a lake in Rwanda located in Akagera National Park in the Eastern Province, in the north-east of the country on the border with Tanzania. The lake lies within the administrative area of Rwimbogo, in the Eastern Province.

== Geography ==
Lake Mihindi is situated in the Rwimbogo area of the Eastern Province of Rwanda, within Akagera National Park along the country's north-eastern border with Tanzania.

== See also ==
- List of lakes in Rwanda
- Geography of Rwanda
