= Sake, Rwanda =

Sake
- Town and sector
- Location within Rwanda
- Coordinates: 2.21828°S 30.38564°E
- Country: Rwanda
- Province: Western Province
- District: Ngoma District

Area
  - Town and sector: 57.02 km^{2} (22.02 sq mi)

Population (2022 census)
  - Town and sector: 28,822
  - Density: 505.5/km^{2} (1,309/sq mi)
  - Urban: 5,966

Sake is a town and sector in southeastern Rwanda in Ngoma District, with a population of 28,822 (2022 census) and an area of 57.02 square kilometers.

== Transport ==
The town lies on a possible route for the Rwanda Railway under consideration in 2009.

== See also ==
- Railway stations in Rwanda
