= Lake Nasho =

Lake in Eastern Province, Rwanda

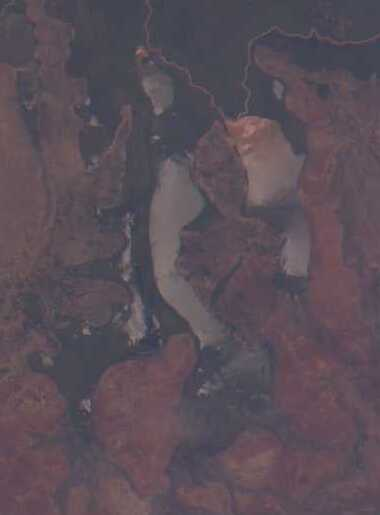
- Satellite view of Lake Nasho, Cyambwe and Mpanga
- Interactive map of Lake Nasho
- Location: Eastern Province, Rwanda
- Coordinates: 2.04472°S 30.7306°E
- Surface area: 3.5 km^{2} (860 acres)
- Surface elevation: 1,286 m (4,219 ft)

Lake Nasho is a lake in Rwanda, located in the Eastern Province. Its altitude is estimated at 1,286 metres.

It is located in the village of Akagera, Kayonza District, Eastern Province, Rwanda. The lake lies in the southern part of the Akagera region. Lake Nasho has a surface area of approximately 3.5 km².

Lake Nasho is one of several lakes in the Eastern Province that are monitored for water quality by the Rwanda Water Resources Board through the Rwanda Water Portal. The lake forms part of the broader Akagera wetland system, a complex of lakes, swamps, and rivers in eastern Rwanda that supports significant biodiversity.

== See also ==
- Geography of Rwanda
- Akagera National Park
- List of lakes in Rwanda
