= Lake Burera =

- Bulera
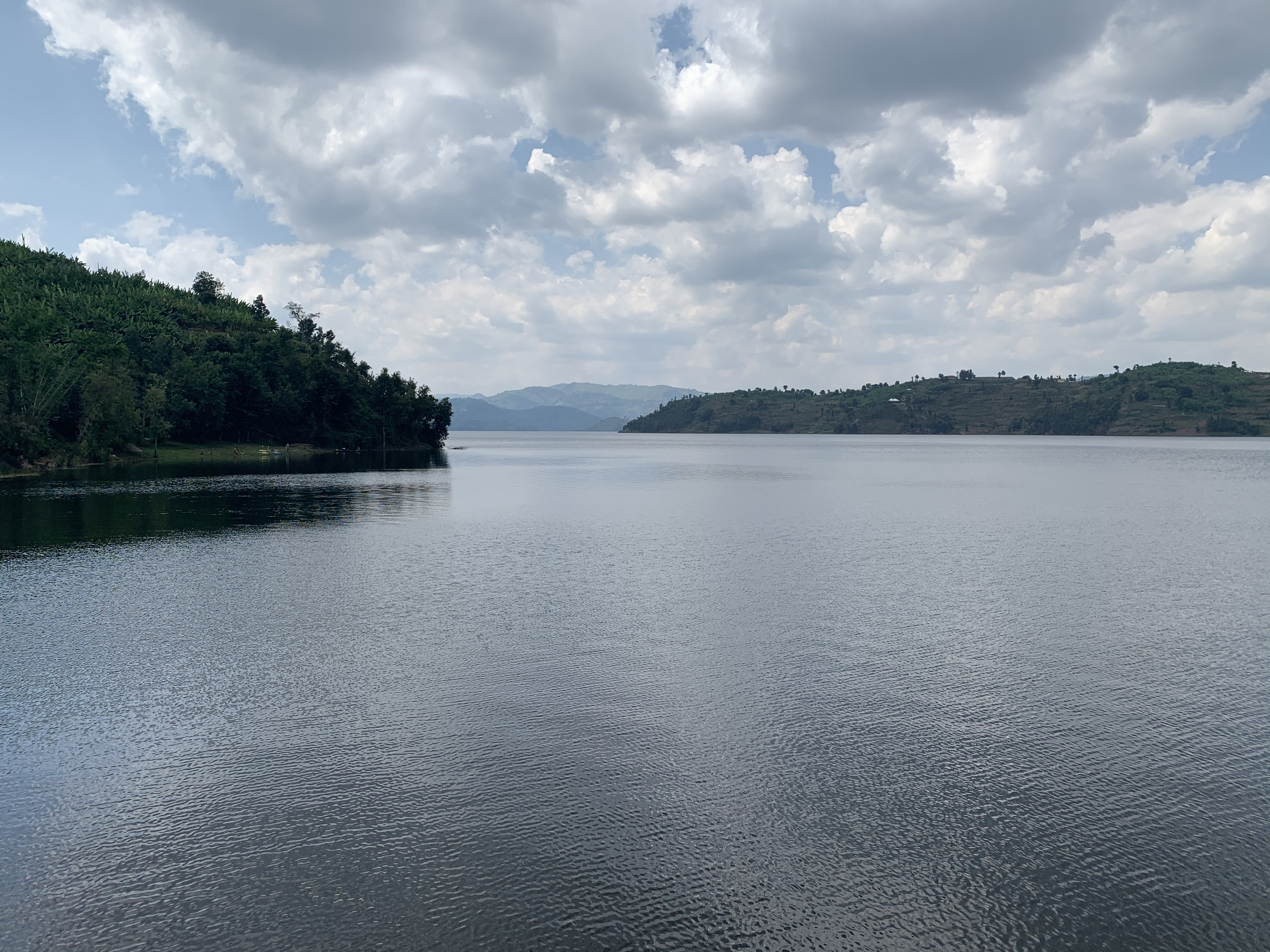

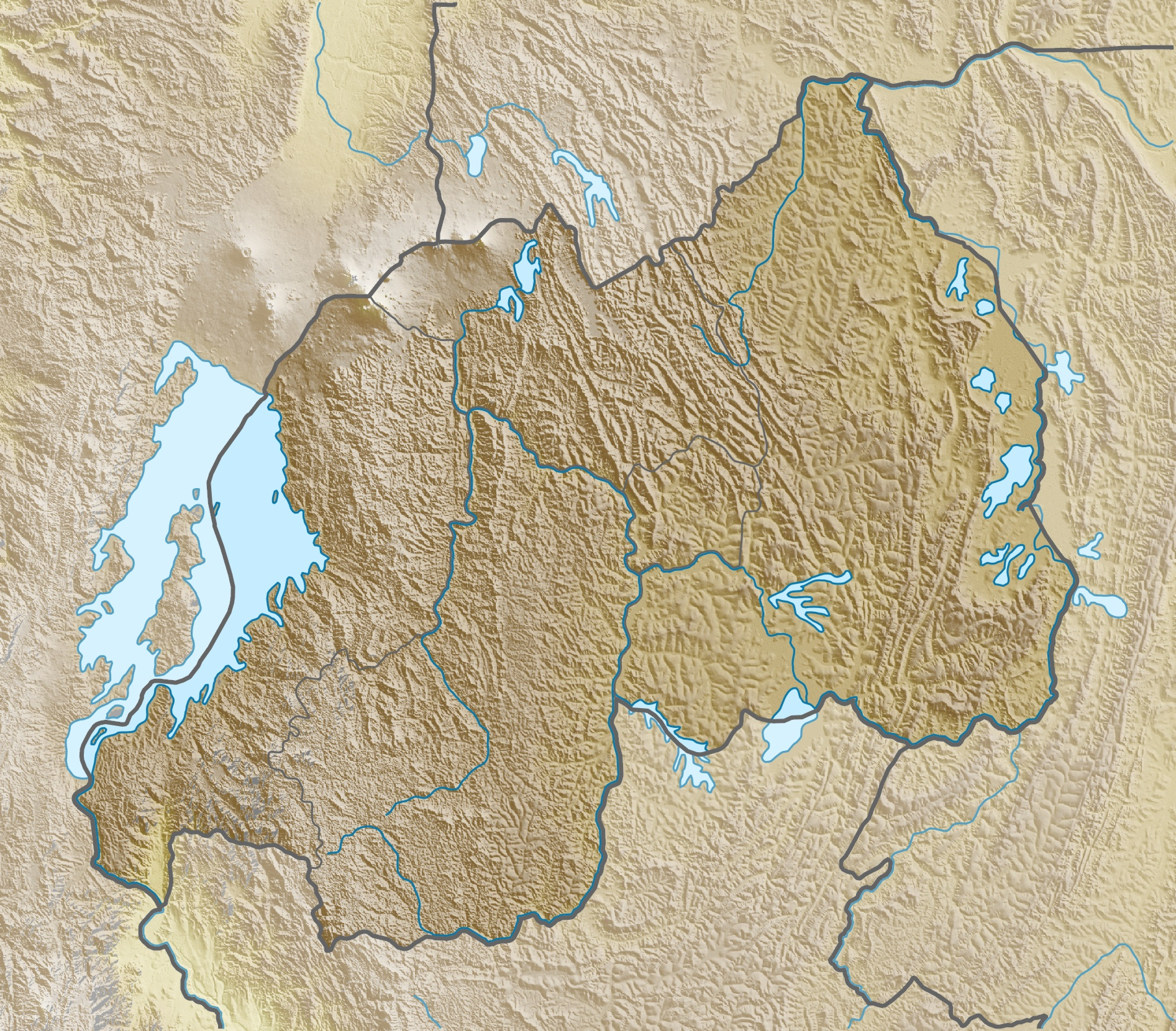
- Location within Rwanda
- Location: Rwanda
- Coordinates: 1.45°S 29.78°E
- Type: lake
- Primary inflows: Rugezi
- Primary outflows: Musasa, Ntaruka
- Surface area: 55 km^{2} (20 sq mi)
- Surface elevation: 1,860 m (6,102 ft)

LAKE BURERA

Lake Burera or Bulera is a lake of northwestern Rwanda, at the border with Uganda. With an area of 55 km^{2} (20 sq mi), it is the second largest lake entirely in Rwanda after Lake Ihema (100 km^{2} [40 sq mi]). Considering all other lakes in the country (including lakes shared with other countries), it would be the 5th largest after Lake Kivu 2,700 km^{2} (1,040 sq mi) between Rwanda and the Democratic Republic of the Congo, Lake Rweru between Rwanda and Burundi at 133 km^{2} (50 sq mi) of which only 47 km^{2} (20 sq mi) are in Rwanda, Lake Ihema and Lake Cohoha 74 km^{2} (30 sq mi) also shared with Burundi of which only 19 km^{2} (10 sq mi) are in Rwanda. The lake is located in a densely populated North of the country in Burera District which got its name from this lake. The closet major city is the city of Musanze 25 km (16 mi) West of the lake.

Lake Burera borders Uganda's wetlands on the southern slopes of Mount Muhavura at 1,860 m (6,102 ft) of altitude.

It lies to the North East of its twin Lake Ruhondo in which it empties via a stream called Ntaruka. Burera is almost twice as large as Lake Ruhondo and despite only being 600 meters apart, the two lakes are separated by a dramatic drop in altitude of 100 m (328 ft).

Ntaruka is a 600 m (1,969 ft) long stream connecting the two lakes and drops of about 100 meters in . Due to this steep drop, a hydroelectric power plant has been constructed on this stream and produces 11.5 MW.
