= Highland temperate climate =

Climate type of tropical highlands

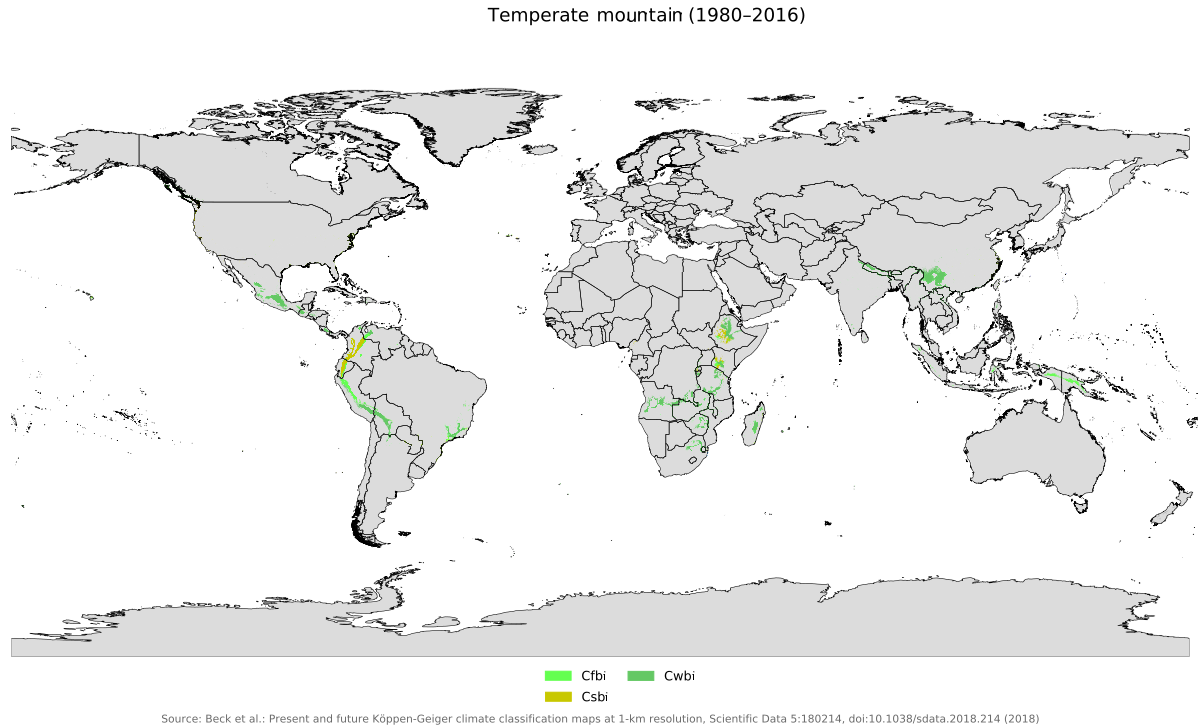
Distribution of these climates in the world

Highland temperate climates are a temperate climate sub-type, typically located in the tropics with characteristics different from other temperate climates such as Oceanic or Mediterranean, where they are often included without proper differentiation.

The main difference between highland temperate climates and other, similar, climates, is that their consistent weather throughout the year is caused by altitude, and not latitude. Highland temperate climates do not experience the four seasons (spring, summer, autumn, winter). Instead, they experience rainfall variation in the form of a dry season and wet season. It is usually said that these regions have an Eternal Spring or an Eternal Autumn. These are sometimes called "tropical highland climates" or "highland tropical climates", though the name is a misnomer other than regional location.

A letter "i" is added to indicate its isothermal condition (Cfb, oceanic climate, Cfbi, highland humid temperate climate).

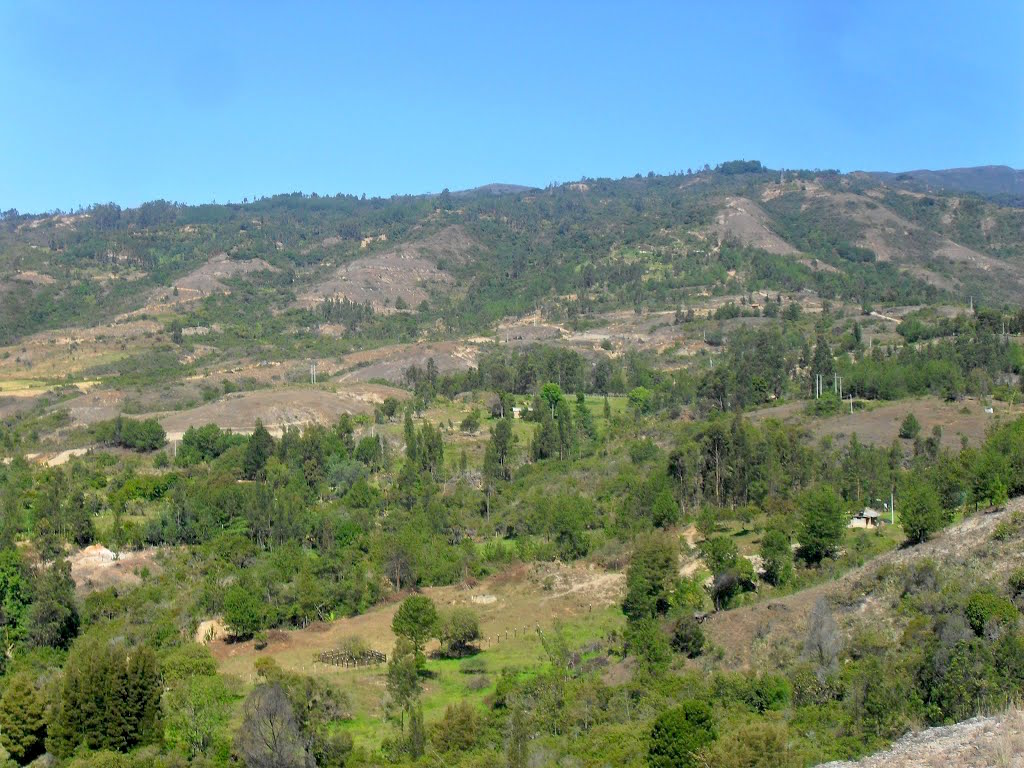
Rural scene on Tinjacá, Boyacá, Colombia, with the typic vegetation, highland wooded savanna

== Location ==
Highland temperate climates are characteristic of south and central Mexican highlands, Central American mountains, the north Andes in South America, and the East African mountains, among a few other areas like Baguio City, Philippines and the New Guinea highlands.

== Causes and characteristics ==
The high altitudes of highlands lead to decreases in temperature and atmospheric pressure compared to lowland regions. Temperatures decrease by approximately 0.6 °C or 1 °C every 100 m. This is due to the adiabatic rate air. Tropical climates appear at altitudes of 0 and 1500 m, semihumid and isothermal highland temperate climates appear at 1500 m to 3000 m (depending on latitude). Above 3500 m is the alpine tundra climate ETH, identified with páramo and puna vegetation.

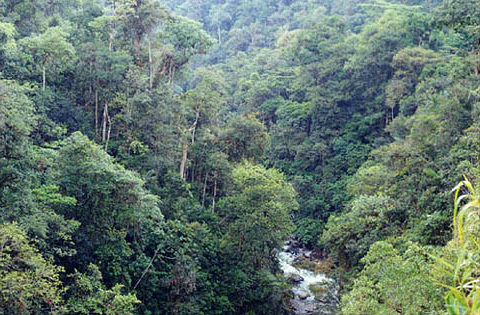
Andean forest of Colombia and Ecuador, in Podocarpus National Park.

This climate has often been called oceanic Cfb or mediterranean Csb; however, it is not Mediterranean because it is not found in temperate latitudes and does not border deserts, nor is it oceanic because humidity here does not come from ocean, but from a tropical rainforest near (Congo, Amazon, Chocó).

Mean temperatures are around 12 °C to 19 °C throughout the year. Nevertheless, there are high daily temperature ranges. There may be high nebulosity and air humidity. Clear skies are rare.

Precipitations, only as rainfall, and often hail, it decrease with altitude, it is around 700–2,000 mm, that is, higher than temperate zone.

The vegetation basically is Highland Forest, beside highland wooded savanna and scrubs.

== Sub-types ==
The particular location of these highlands, many of which are just north of the equator but south of the meteorological equator, combined with the relatively narrow annual temperature range, makes distinction between winter and summer speculative. Sometimes the categories of Cfbi, Cwbi and Csbi are confused, similar to tropical climates Aw and As.

=== Highland humid temperate climate Cfbi ===
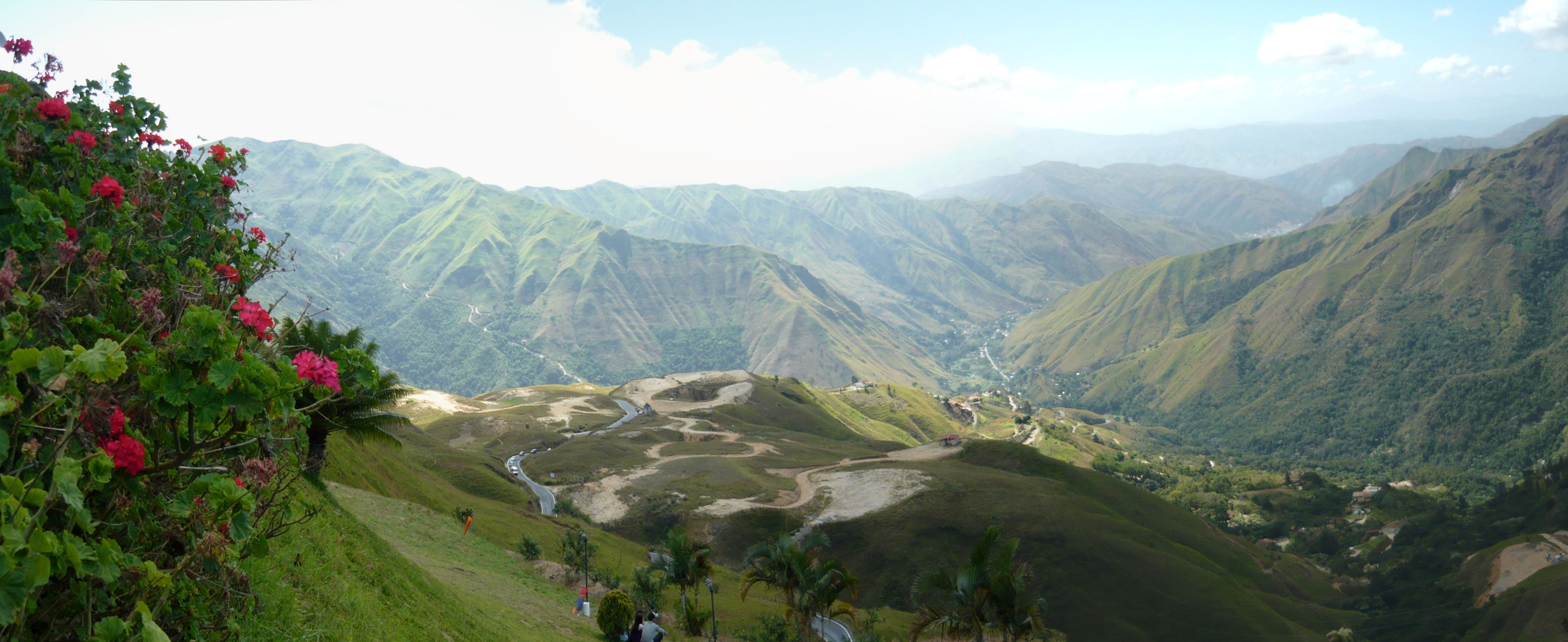
Colonia Tovar scene, with typic vegetation of Cfbi climates.

Defined by precipitation throughout the year, with no dry season. Its temperature oscillates between 10 °C and 20 °C. Precipitation is higher than other highlands, at about 1500 mm. It is the tropical variation of the oceanic climate Cfb. It can appear anywhere within the tropical zone with enough rainfall and adequate altitude.

Cities:

- Colonia Tovar, Venezuela
- Mérida, Venezuela

=== Highland monsoon temperate climate Cwbi ===
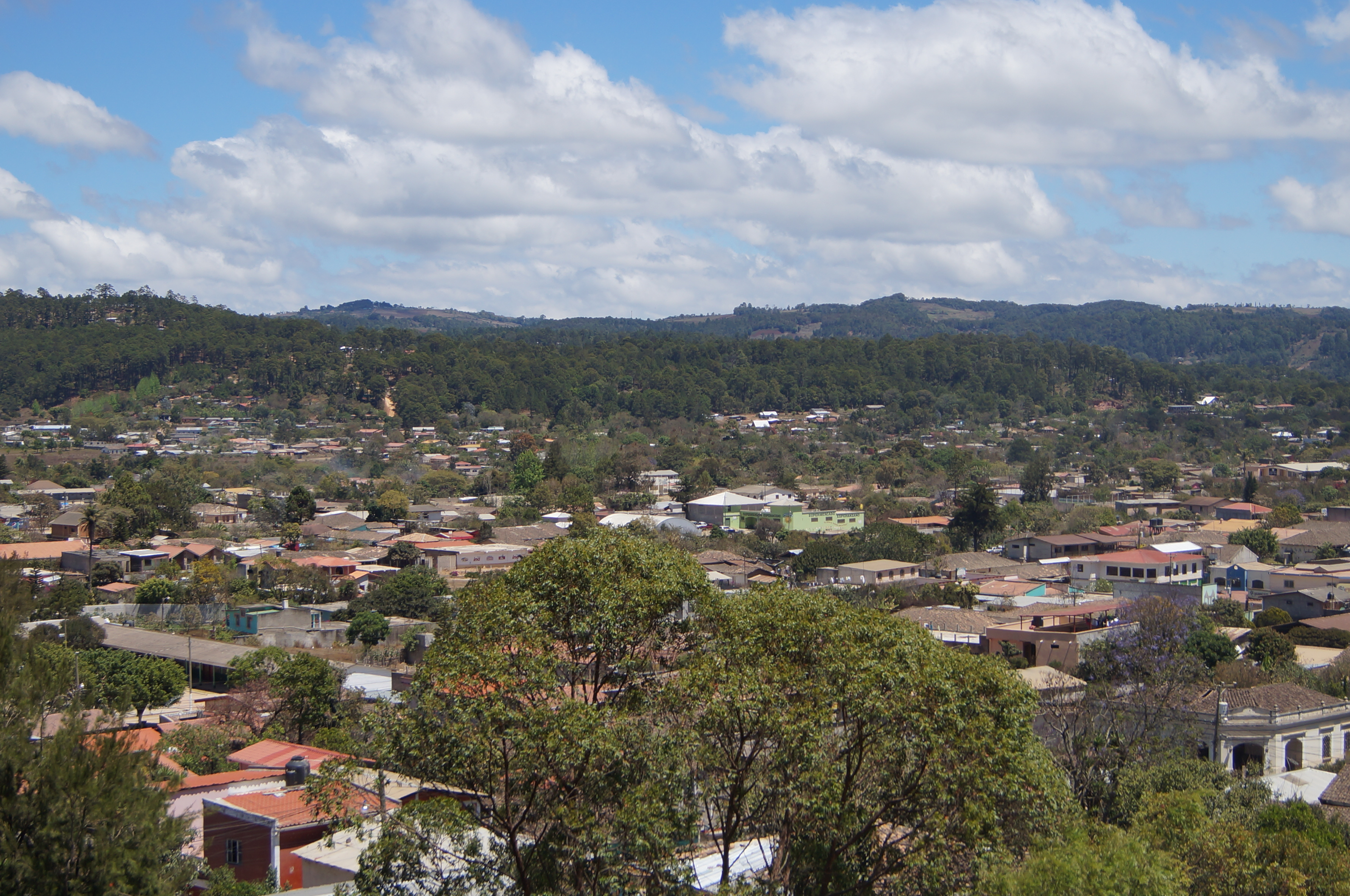
Scene of La Esperanza, Honduras

Rainfall comes in hipotetic summer (monsoon), usually between March and June in the North Hemipshere and November and February in the South Hemisphere. The dry season takes place in winter or cold months. Temperatures around 12 °C and 19 °C and precipitations from 800mm. Of the three subtypes, it is the only one that occurs at a higher latitude, extending to subtropical areas exceeding 15° north and south latitude, which is why it usually presents a greater temperature range, between 3 °C and 4°. It is located in the Peruvian and Bolivian highlands, the mountains of Brazil, the center of Mexico and the mountains of Central America and East Africa. Because of that, its vegetation is variable, ranging from savanna to forests.

Most of the time it is simply called as Cwb, the Köppen classification for subtropical highland climates, because outside the intertropical zone it is existent.

Cities:

- Mexico City, Mexico
- Kunming, China
- Addis Ababa, Ethiopia
- Nairobi, Kenya
- La Paz, Bolivia
- Cusco, Peru

=== Highland equatorial climate Csbi ===
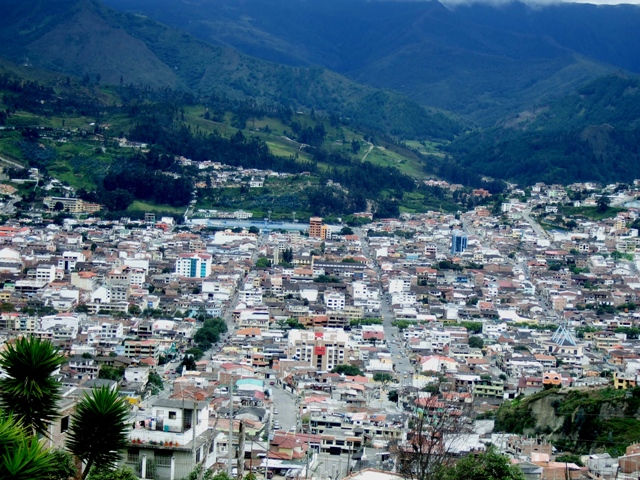
Scene of Loja, Ecuador, with typic vegetation of highland equatorial climate

Defined by a dry season with more hot and sunny months, and a marked wet season with bimodal regime, where one of them is stronger than the other. Precipitation is normally between 700mm to 2000mm, humidity decrease with altitude, annual rainfall decrease 100 mm every 100 m altitude. Intertropical Convergence Zone appears twice yearly, while temperature depends on altitude, generally between 12 °C and 18 °C, being stable and unchanging throughout the year.

It is located in equatorial latitudes to no more than 5°S and 5°N of equator. It is almost exclusive to Ecuadorian-Colombian Andes, located from 1500 m altitude. It consists of tropical variation of oceanic mediterranean climate Csb. Common vegetation is the highland wooded savanna. Andean forests or cloudy forests appears above 3000 m of great biodiversity.

Cities:

- Bogotá, Colombia
- Cuenca, Ecuador
- Ibarra, Ecuador
- Manizales, Colombia
- Pasto, Colombia
- Popayán, Colombia
- Quito, Ecuador
- Tunja, Colombia

== See also ==
- Temperate climate
- Humid temperate climate
- Subhumid temperate climate
- Mediterranean climate
- Altitude
- Köppen climate classification
