= Geography of Rwanda =

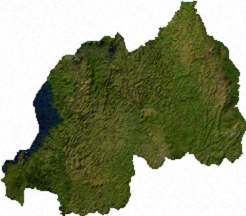
- Continent: Africa
- Region: East Africa
- Coordinates: 2.00°S 30.00°E
- Area: Ranked 148th
  - Total: 26,338 km^{2} (10,169 sq mi)
  - Land: 93.66%
  - Water: 6.34%
- Coastline: 0 km (0 mi)
- Borders: 930 km (578 mi) Border lengths included: Uganda (172 km) (107 mi); Tanzania (222 km) (138 mi); Burundi (315 km) (196 mi); Democratic Republic of the Congo (221 km) (137 mi)
- Highest point: Mount Karisimbi, 4,507 m (14,787 ft)
- Lowest point: Rusizi River, 950 m (3,117 ft)
- Longest river: Nyabarongo, 351 km (218 mi)
- Largest lake: Lake Kivu max. depth 480 m (1,575 ft)
- Climate: temperate tropical highland
- Terrain: mountains in the west; rolling hills in the centre; savanna, plains and swamps in the east
- Natural resources: gold, tin ore, tantalum, wolframite, methane, hydropower, arable land
- Natural hazards: periodic droughts and floods; volcanism in the Virunga Mountains
- Environmental issues: deforestation, overgrazing, land degradation, soil erosion, soil exhaustion, wetland degradation and loss of biodiversity, poaching

The geography of Rwanda is defined by its position in the Eastern African highlands, a few degrees south of the Equator and near the western branch of the East African Rift. Rwanda's territory covers 26,338 km^{2} (10,169 sq mi), making it the 148th largest country in the world. Bordered by Uganda to the north, Tanzania to the east, Burundi to the south and the Democratic Republic of the Congo to the west, it is landlocked and has no coastline, and lies between latitudes 1°02′ and 2°50′ S and longitudes 28°51′ and 30°53′ E. Its land boundaries total 930 km (580 mi).

The major geomorphological divisions of Rwanda run from west to east: the Albertine Rift mountains, the central plateau and the eastern lowlands. The mountains of the west include the Virunga Mountains, a chain of volcanoes along the north-western border, and among them Mount Karisimbi, the highest peak in the country at 4,507 m (14,787 ft). East of them lies a plateau of rolling hills and steep ridges, which give Rwanda its nickname, the "Land of a Thousand Hills". The land falls away further eastward to the savannahs, plains and wetlands of the Akagera basin. The lowest ground, however, lies on the opposite side of the country: the Rusizi River at the Congolese border, 950 m (3,117 ft) above sea level.

The Congo–Nile watershed runs roughly north–south through the western highlands, dividing the country between two major drainage basins. About two-thirds of Rwanda drains eastward into the Nile basin, mainly through the Nyabarongo–Kagera system that feeds Lake Victoria, while about one-third drains westward into the Congo basin through Lake Kivu and the Rusizi. Lake Kivu, one of the African Great Lakes, forms much of the western border, with smaller lakes such as Muhazi, Ihema and Burera scattered across the interior. Despite its proximity to the Equator, Rwanda's high elevation gives it a temperate tropical highland climate, with two rainy seasons and rainfall heavier in the western highlands than in the drier eastern lowlands. Its ecosystems range from mountain forest to savanna and wetland, and support a rich biodiversity despite the small national territory.

The population recorded at the 2022 census was 13,246,394, giving a population density of 503 inhabitants per square kilometre, among the highest in Africa. Life expectancy at birth stood at 69.7 years. Administratively, Rwanda is divided into the Northern, Southern, Eastern and Western provinces (intara), together with the City of Kigali, which is both the national capital and an independent administrative entity. These subdivide into districts (akarere), the main level of local government. Only about 28% of the population lives in urban areas, and that share is heavily concentrated in Kigali.

== Area and borders ==
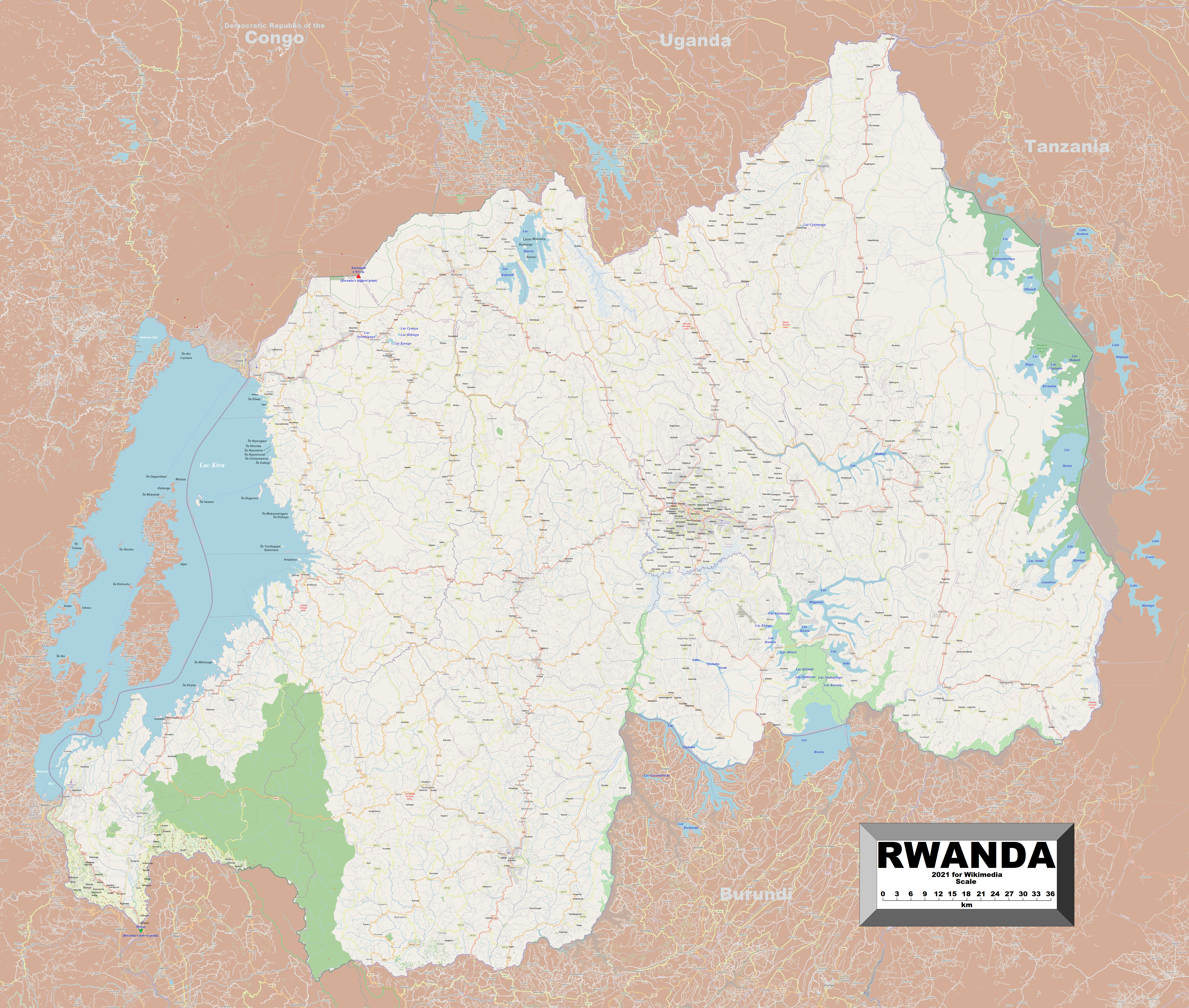
Enlargeable, detailed map of Rwanda

Rwanda is a landlocked country in East Africa, a few degrees south of the Equator. Its territory covers 26,338 km^{2} (10,169 sq mi), of which 24,668 km^{2} (9,524 sq mi) is land and 1,670 km^{2} (640 sq mi), or about 6%, is water. It ranks 148th in the world by area.

The World Factbook describes Rwanda as slightly smaller than the U.S. state of Maryland.

Rwanda borders Uganda for 172 km (107 mi) in the north, Tanzania for 222 km (138 mi) in the east, Burundi for 315 km (196 mi) in the south and the Democratic Republic of the Congo for 221 km (137 mi) in the west, giving land boundaries of 930 km (580 mi) in total.

Length of land borders of Rwanda
Country	Length
Uganda	172 km (107 mi)
Tanzania	222 km (138 mi)
Burundi	315 km (196 mi)
Democratic Republic of the Congo	221 km (137 mi)
Total	930 km (580 mi)

=== Extreme points ===
Rwanda's geographical extreme points all lie along its international borders rather than at named settlements. The country extends from 1°02′S in the north to 2°50′S in the south, and from 28°51′E in the west to 30°53′E in the east.

Extreme points of Rwanda
Point	Location	District	Province	Coordinates
Northernmost	Border with Uganda, north-west of Kagitumba	Nyagatare	Eastern	1°02′51″S 30°26′52″E
Easternmost	Border with Tanzania, in the Kagera River	Kirehe	Eastern	2°04′39″S 30°53′57″E
Southernmost	Border with Burundi	Nyaruguru	Southern	2°50′23″S 29°22′15″E
Westernmost	Border with the Democratic Republic of the Congo, in the Rusizi river south of Bukavu	Rusizi	Western	2°31′44″S 28°51′42″E
Highest	Mount Karisimbi, Virunga Mountains	Musanze	Northern	4,507 m (14,787 ft) above sea level
Lowest	Rusizi River, lower valley	Rusizi	Western	950 m (3,117 ft) above sea level

=== Access to the sea ===
Rwanda has no coastline and no maritime claims. Its overseas trade passes through the Indian Ocean ports of Dar es Salaam and Mombasa, along two regional transport corridors (see below).

== Physical geography ==
=== Geology ===
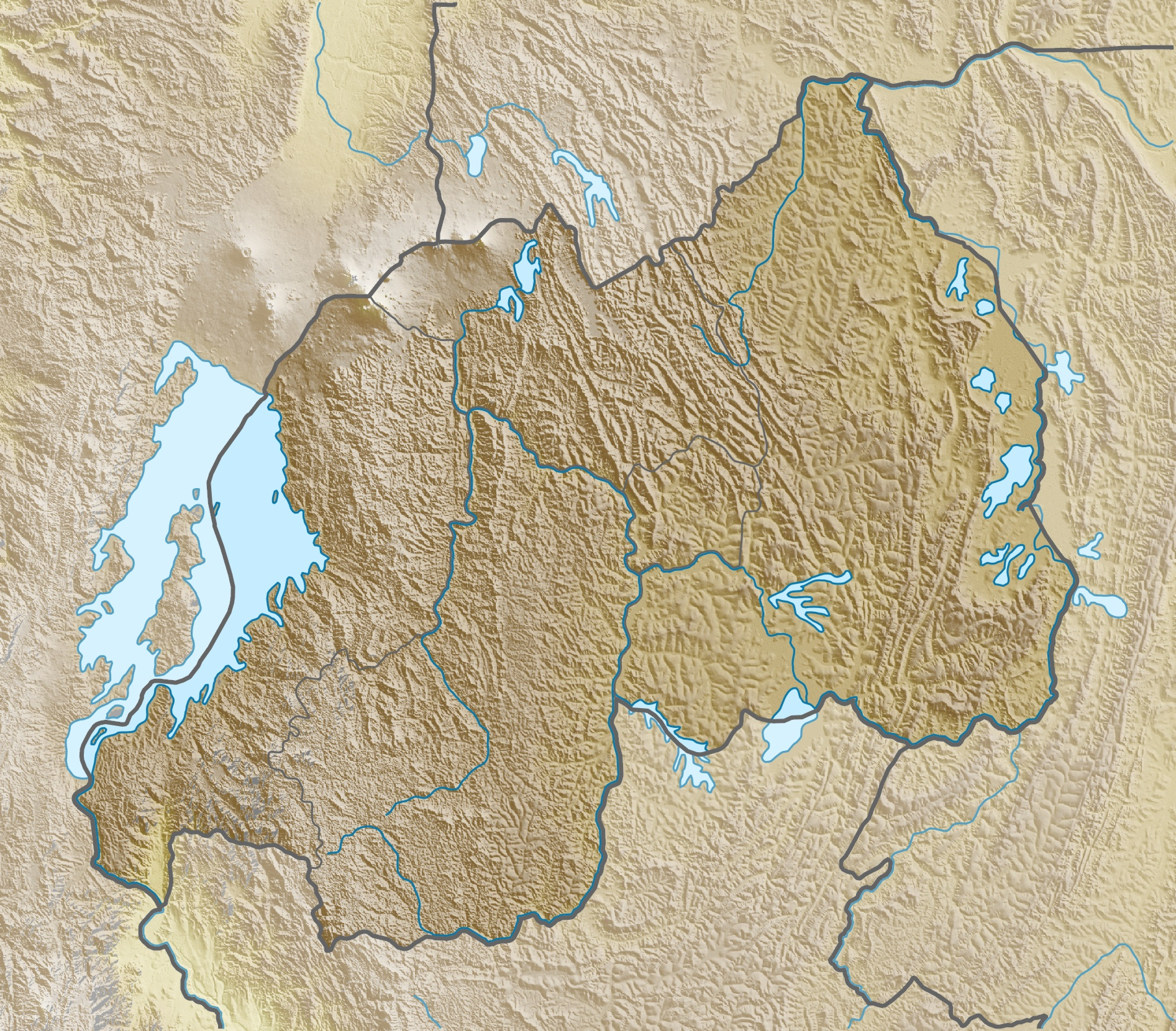
Relief of Rwanda

Rwanda lies entirely on the Victoria Microplate. Its western border follows the Albertine Rift, the western branch of the East African Rift, where steep mountains descend to Lake Kivu and where the Virunga Mountains form a volcanic range containing the country's highest peaks. Volcanic activity has given much of the country soils that are largely volcanic and fertile, supporting intensive subsistence agriculture; the combination of steep slopes and heavy rainfall, however, makes those soils vulnerable to soil erosion and land degradation.

=== Topography ===
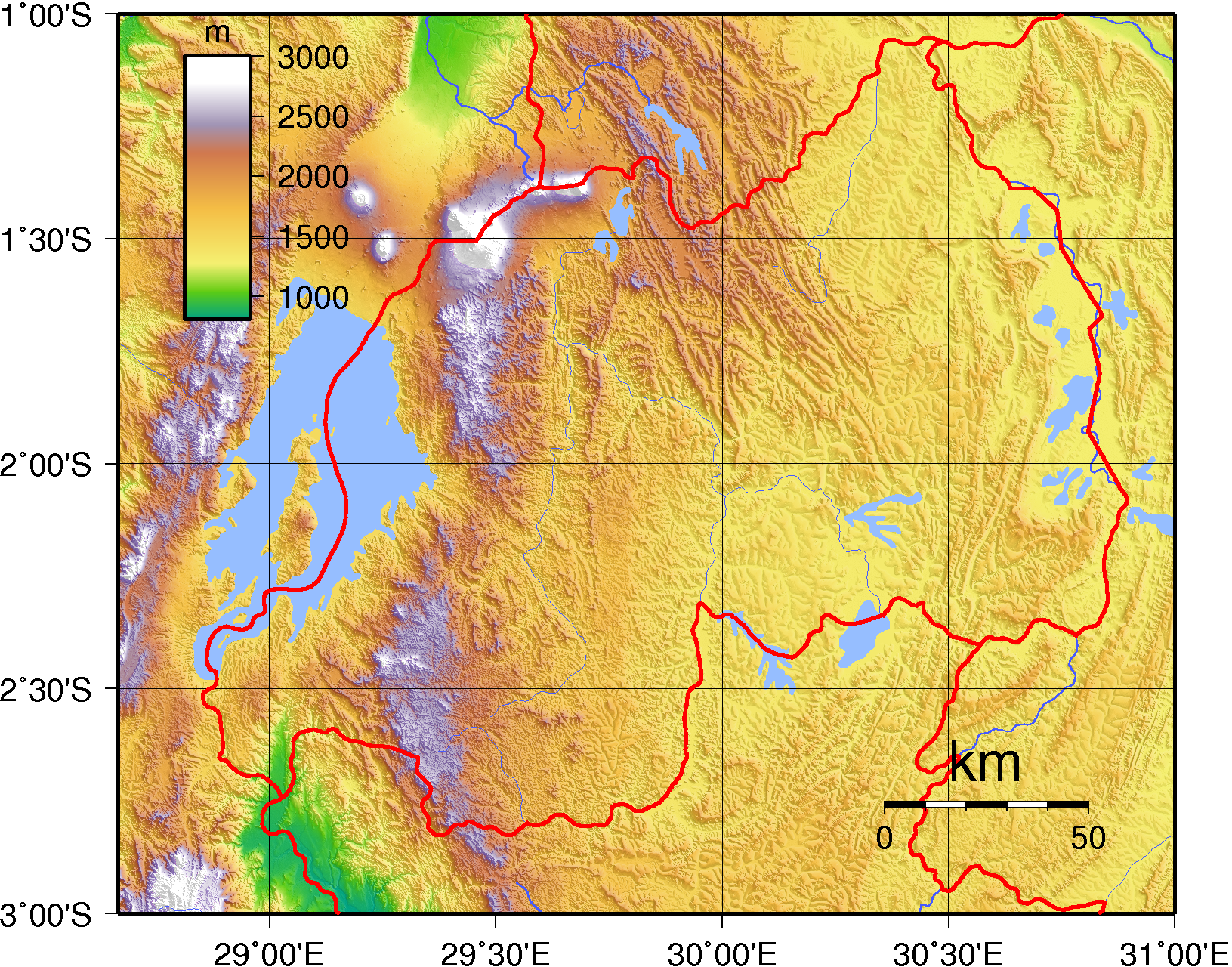
Topographic map of Rwanda

Rwanda's terrain is predominantly mountainous and hilly, with savanna areas in the east and many lakes across the country. Relief falls consistently from west to east: mountains dominate the west, highlands extend across the centre, and the land slopes downward to plains and savanna along the eastern border. The rolling hills and steep ridges that result give Rwanda its nickname, the "Land of a Thousand Hills". The country's topography ranges from low-lying river valleys to high volcanic peaks, with the lowest point at the Rusizi River at 950 m (3,117 ft) and the highest at Mount Karisimbi at 4,507 m (14,787 ft).

==== Albertine Rift and the Virunga Mountains ====
Mountains dominate central and western Rwanda. These mountains are part of the Albertine Rift Mountains that flank the Albertine branch of the East African Rift, which runs from north to south along Rwanda's western border. The highest peaks are found in the Virunga volcano chain in the north-west; this includes Mount Karisimbi, Rwanda's highest point, at 4,507 m (14,787 ft). This western section of Rwanda, which lies within the Albertine Rift montane forests ecoregion, has an elevation of 1,500 to 2,500 metres (4,921 to 8,202 ft).

==== Central plateau ====
The centre of the country is predominantly rolling hills, forming a plateau that descends eastward from the Albertine Rift highlands. Kigali, the national capital, lies in this central region.

==== Eastern lowlands and the Akagera basin ====
The eastern border region consists of savanna, plains and swamps. This is the lowest and driest part of the country, and it contains a network of smaller lakes and marshlands, including the wetlands of Akagera National Park, through which the Kagera flows along the border with Tanzania.

=== Hydrography ===
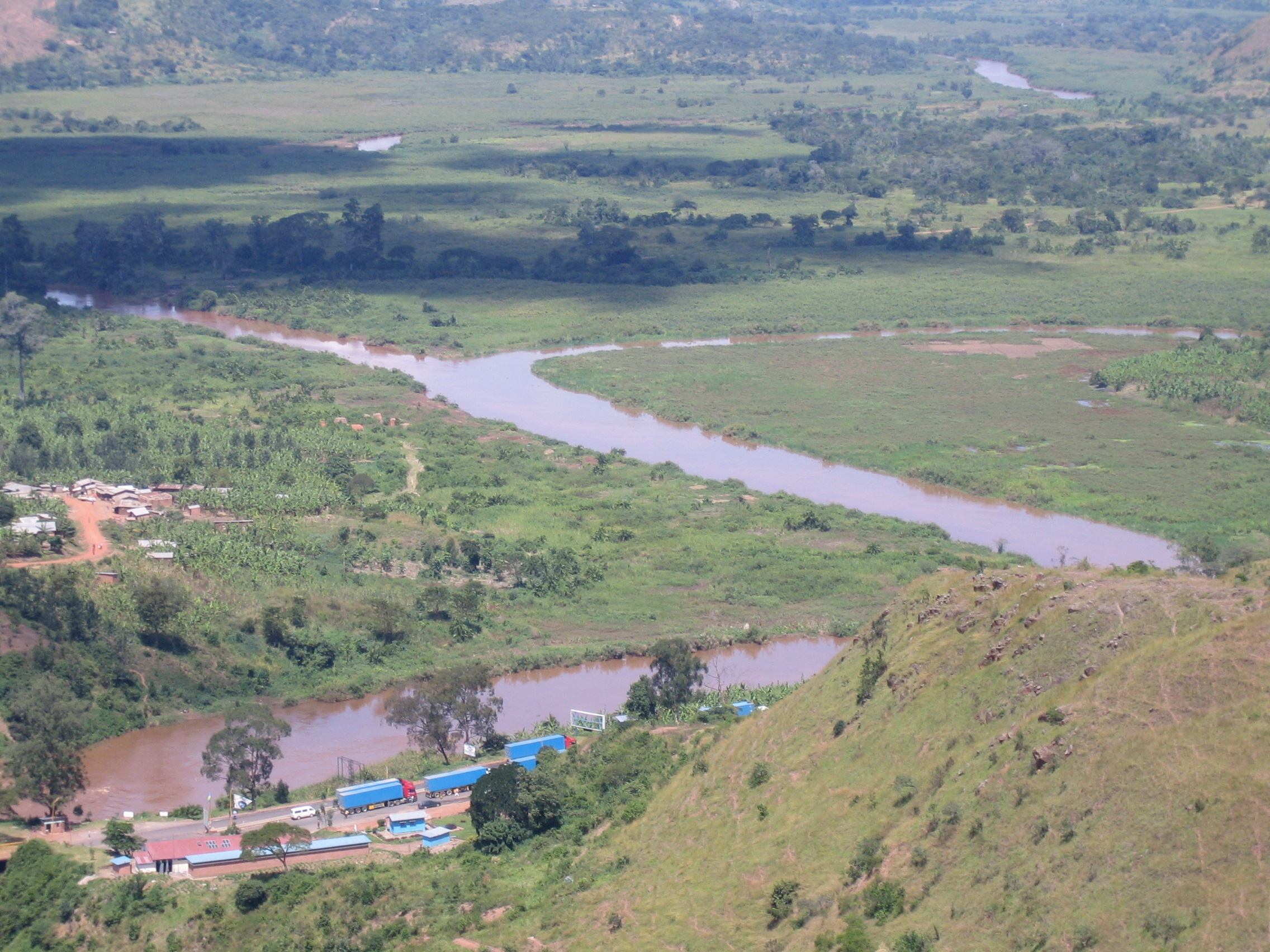
The Kagera and Ruvubu rivers, part of the upper Nile

The watershed between the major Congo and Nile drainage basins runs from north to south through Rwanda's western highlands. About 67% of Rwanda's territory lies in the Nile basin and drains eastward, mainly through the Nyabarongo–Akagera system. The remaining 33% lies in the Congo basin and drains westward, mainly through Lake Kivu and the Rusizi. (Note: The Nile Basin Initiative gives a higher share, about 80% for the Nile basin and 20% for the Congo basin.) The country's longest river is the 351-kilometre (218 mi) Nyabarongo, which rises in the south-west, flows north, east and south-east before merging with the Akanyaru. Together with the Ruvubu, it forms the Kagera, which flows north along the eastern border with Tanzania. The Nyabarongo–Akagera eventually drains into Lake Victoria, and its source in Nyungwe Forest is a contender for the as-yet undetermined overall source of the Nile. Other major rivers include the Rusizi, which drains Lake Kivu southward into Lake Tanganyika and ultimately the Congo River.

Rwanda has many lakes, the largest being Lake Kivu. This lake occupies the floor of the Albertine Rift along most of the length of Rwanda's western border, and with a maximum depth of 480 metres (1,575 ft), it is the 20th deepest lake in the world. Other sizeable lakes include Burera and Ruhondo in the north, Muhazi, Rweru and Ihema, the last being the largest of a string of lakes in the eastern plains of Akagera National Park. Total renewable water resources amount to 13.3 km^{3} (3.2 cu mi) (2022 estimate).

=== Climate ===
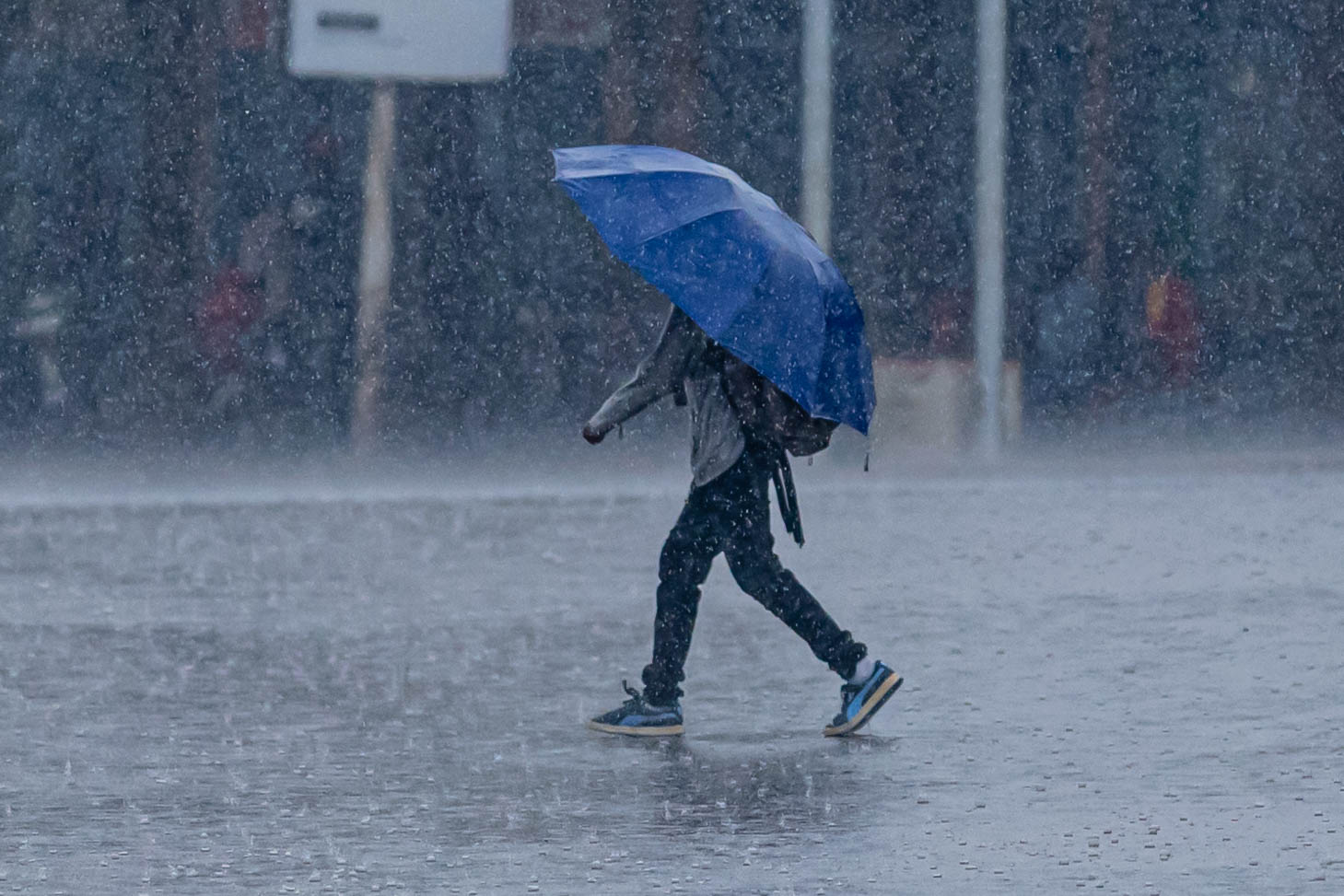
Rain in Kigali (January 2020)

Rwanda has a temperate tropical highland climate, with lower temperatures than are typical for equatorial countries because of its high elevation. Under the Köppen climate classification the country combines a tropical savanna climate and a subtropical highland climate (Aw and Cwb/Cfb), with significant regional variation between the high mountains of the west and north-west and the lower, warmer plains of the east.

Kigali, in the centre of the country, has a typical daily temperature range between 12 and 27 °C (54 and 81 °F), with little variation through the year. Average daytime temperatures in the capital range between 25 °C (77 °F) and 28 °C (82 °F), while night-time temperatures remain around 15 °C (59 °F). There are some temperature variations across the country; the mountainous west and north are generally cooler than the lower-lying east, with the coolest conditions prevailing in the highlands of the Northern and Western provinces near Volcanoes National Park.

There are two rainy seasons and two dry seasons in the year: a long rainy season from about February to May and a short one from October to December, separated by a long dry season from June to September and a shorter one around January. (Note: Sources differ on the precise months. King (2007) gives the rainy seasons as running from February to June and from September to December, separated by a major dry season from June to September, during which there is often no rain at all, and a shorter and less severe one from December to February.) Rainfall varies geographically, with the west and north-west of the country receiving more precipitation annually than the east and south-east. Annual precipitation in Kigali averages about 1,100 mm (43 in), though totals can exceed 1,500 mm (59 in) in mountainous zones. Average humidity in Kigali remains between 70 and 90% depending on the season, and rainfall variability, especially during El Niño and La Niña years, continues to influence agriculture, water availability and flood risk.

Climate data for Kigali, Rwanda
Month	Jan	Feb	Mar	Apr	May	Jun	Jul	Aug	Sep	Oct	Nov	Dec	Year
Mean daily maximum °C (°F)	26.9 (80.4)	27.4 (81.3)	26.9 (80.4)	26.2 (79.2)	25.9 (78.6)	26.4 (79.5)	27.1 (80.8)	28.0 (82.4)	28.2 (82.8)	27.2 (81.0)	26.1 (79.0)	26.4 (79.5)	26.9 (80.4)
Mean daily minimum °C (°F)	15.6 (60.1)	15.8 (60.4)	15.7 (60.3)	16.1 (61.0)	16.2 (61.2)	15.3 (59.5)	15.0 (59.0)	16.0 (60.8)	16.0 (60.8)	15.9 (60.6)	15.5 (59.9)	15.6 (60.1)	15.7 (60.3)
Average rainfall mm (inches)	76.9 (3.03)	91.0 (3.58)	114.2 (4.50)	154.2 (6.07)	88.1 (3.47)	18.6 (0.73)	11.4 (0.45)	31.1 (1.22)	69.6 (2.74)	105.7 (4.16)	112.7 (4.44)	77.4 (3.05)	950.9 (37.44)
Average rainy days	11	11	15	18	13	2	1	4	10	17	17	14	133
Source: World Meteorological Organization; Rwanda Meteorology Agency (Meteo Rwanda, 2023)

=== Natural hazards ===
Natural hazards in Rwanda include periodic droughts and floods, particularly during the rainy seasons, as well as volcanism in the Virunga Mountains in the north-west, along the border with the Democratic Republic of the Congo. The most active volcano is Mount Nyiragongo, which poses a regional risk of lava flows and gas emissions.

=== Biodiversity ===
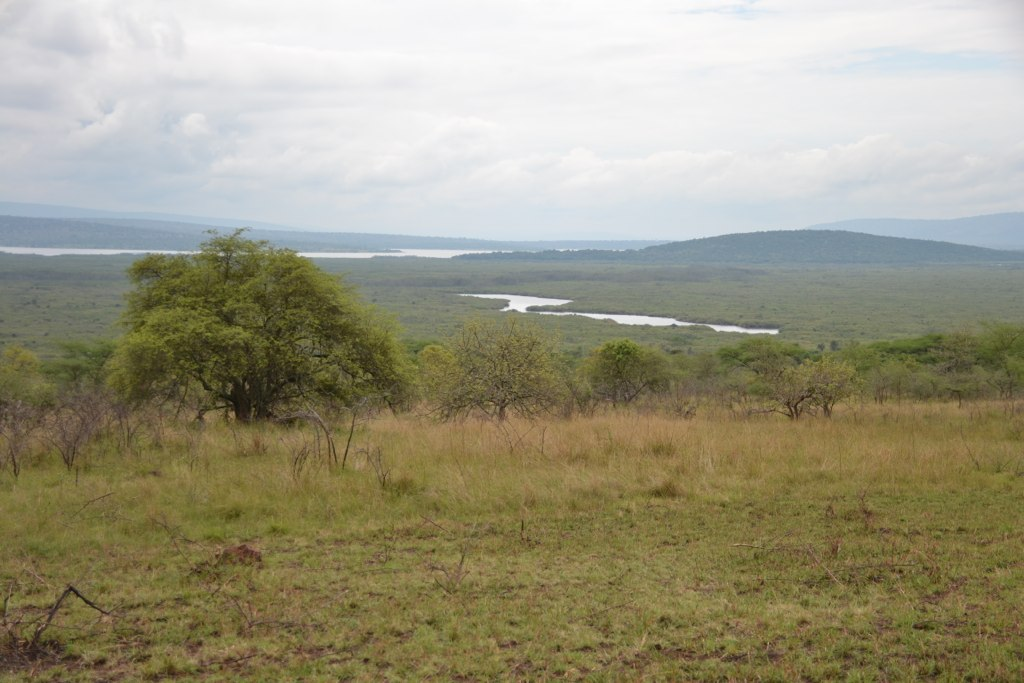
Savanna, wetland and open water in Akagera National Park

Rwanda's ecosystems include mountain forests, savannas and wetlands, which together support rich biodiversity despite the small national territory. The mountainous west falls within the Albertine Rift montane forests ecoregion, which includes Nyungwe Forest in the south-west and, further north, the forested volcanic slopes of Volcanoes National Park in the Virunga Mountains. In the east, the savanna, plains and swamps of Akagera National Park form a contrasting network of lake and wetland habitats. Wetland degradation and loss of biodiversity, together with widespread poaching, are identified among the principal threats to these habitats.

=== Ecology ===
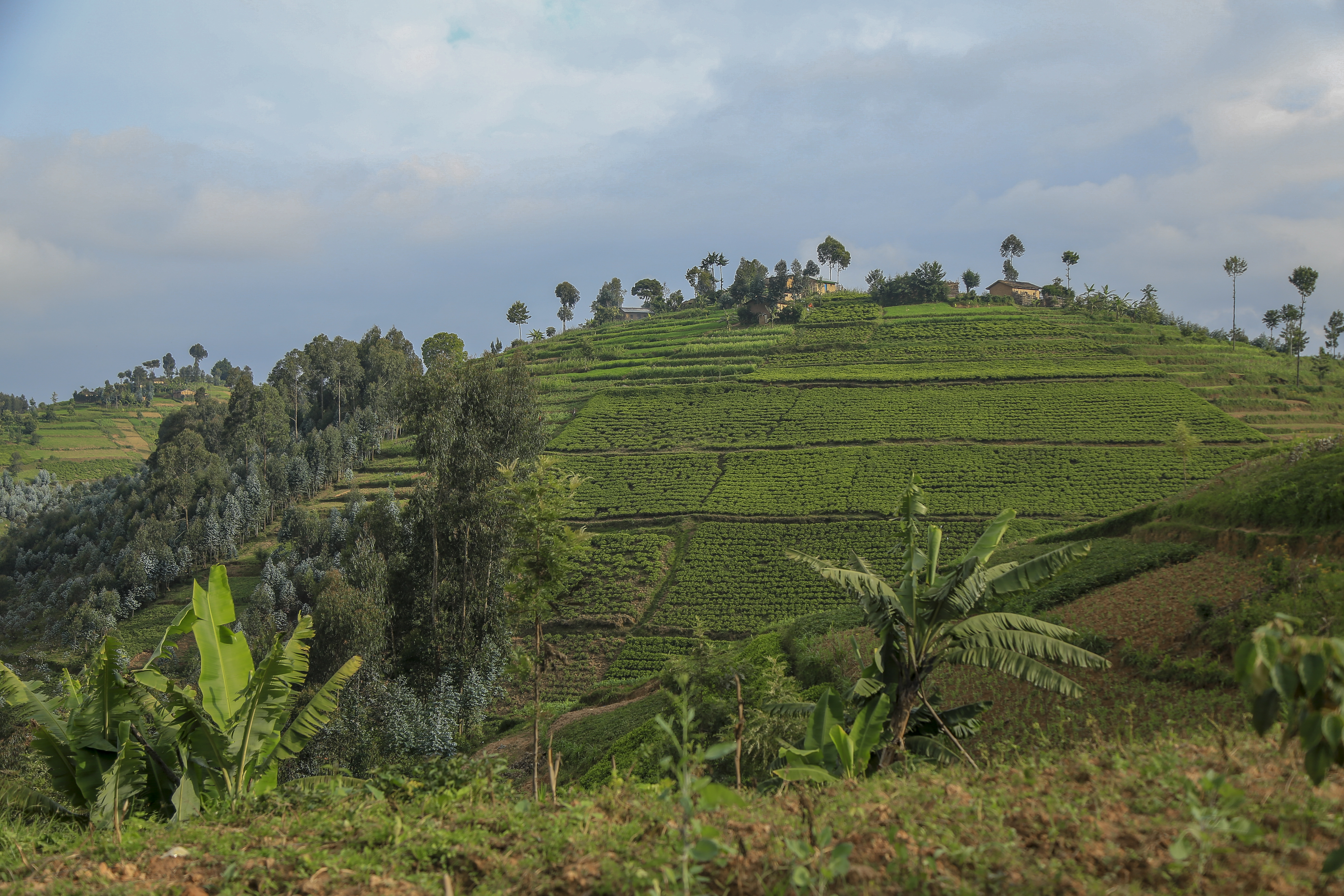
Terraced cultivation on a hillside

Rwanda's environment is shaped by its highland geography and dense population, both of which put pressure on natural resources. Major environmental challenges include deforestation for fuel and agriculture, overgrazing, land degradation, soil erosion, a decline in soil fertility (soil exhaustion), wetland degradation and loss of biodiversity, and widespread poaching. Rwanda's growing population has intensified land use, contributing to soil exhaustion and pressure on arable land.

The government has responded with large-scale reforestation, terracing and wetland restoration programmes, including the rehabilitation of the Nyandungu Urban Wetland Eco-Park in Kigali. In 2011 the government adopted the Green Growth and Climate Resilience Strategy. Its long-term aim is for Rwanda to become a developed, climate-resilient and low-carbon economy by 2050.

=== International agreements ===
Rwanda is a party to the following international environmental agreements:

- Convention on Biological Diversity
- United Nations Framework Convention on Climate Change and its Kyoto Protocol
- Comprehensive Nuclear-Test-Ban Treaty and Partial Nuclear Test Ban Treaty
- United Nations Convention to Combat Desertification
- CITES (endangered species)
- Basel Convention (hazardous wastes)
- Montreal Protocol (ozone layer protection)
- Ramsar Convention (wetlands)

Rwanda has signed, but not ratified, the United Nations Convention on the Law of the Sea.

=== Tree cover extent and loss ===
Global Forest Watch publishes annual estimates of tree cover loss and 2000 tree cover extent derived from time-series analysis of Landsat satellite imagery in the Global Forest Change dataset. In this framework, tree cover refers to vegetation taller than 5 m (including natural forests and tree plantations), and tree cover loss is defined as the complete removal of tree cover canopy for a given year, regardless of cause.

For Rwanda, country statistics report cumulative tree cover loss of 49,775 ha (497.75 km^{2}) from 2001 to 2024 (about 10.0% of its 2000 tree cover area). For tree cover density greater than 30%, country statistics report a 2000 tree cover extent of 497,955 ha (4,979.55 km^{2}). The charts and table below display this data. In simple terms, the annual loss number is the area where tree cover disappeared in that year, and the extent number shows what remains of the 2000 tree cover baseline after subtracting cumulative loss. Forest regrowth is not included in the dataset.

Annual tree cover loss in Rwanda, 2001–2024. View chart definition.
Tree cover extent in 2000 minus cumulative tree cover loss in Rwanda, 2001–2024 (loss-only residual; does not account for gain). View chart definition.

Annual tree cover extent and loss, 2001–2024

Annual tree cover extent and loss
Year	Tree cover extent (km2) (Note: This residual measure does not include forest regrowth.)	Annual tree cover loss (km2)
2001	4,964.38	15.17
2002	4,954.95	9.43
2003	4,944.33	10.62
2004	4,933.12	11.21
2005	4,924.92	8.20
2006	4,917.46	7.46
2007	4,903.16	14.30
2008	4,892.16	11.00
2009	4,878.34	13.82
2010	4,853.83	24.51
2011	4,844.57	9.26
2012	4,833.66	10.91
2013	4,808.92	24.74
2014	4,780.02	28.90
2015	4,757.85	22.17
2016	4,730.07	27.78
2017	4,702.76	27.31
2018	4,659.85	42.91
2019	4,634.69	25.16
2020	4,602.81	31.88
2021	4,573.59	29.22
2022	4,548.22	25.37
2023	4,517.85	30.37
2024	4,481.80	36.05

== Human geography ==
=== Demographics ===
The fifth Population and Housing Census recorded a resident population of 13,246,394 as of 15 August 2022. The corresponding population density is 503 inhabitants per square kilometre, which the National Institute of Statistics describes as already one of the highest in Africa. Life expectancy at birth stood at 69.7 years and the total fertility rate at 3.6 children per woman, with 367,312 births recorded during the year. The national sex ratio is 94 males per 100 females.

Settlement is uneven. The Eastern Province is the most populous, with 3,563,145 inhabitants, and the Northern the least, with 2,038,511; the City of Kigali holds 1,745,555.

=== Political geography ===
Administratively, Rwanda is divided into four provinces (intara): the Northern, Southern, Eastern, and Western, together with the City of Kigali, which serves as both the national capital and an independent administrative entity. These provinces and the city are subdivided into districts (akarere), which serve as the main level of local government.

=== Urbanisation ===
Rwanda remains predominantly rural. At the 2022 census 3,701,245 people, or 27.9% of the resident population, lived in urban areas. Urban settlement is concentrated in the City of Kigali, which had 1,745,555 inhabitants, 86.9% of them classified as urban.

Kigali is also by far the most densely settled part of the country, at 2,401 inhabitants per square kilometre against the national figure of 503. Within the city, Kicukiro is the densest district in Rwanda at 2,944 inhabitants per square kilometre, followed by Nyarugenge at 2,830 and Gasabo at 2,056. Outside the capital the densest districts are Rubavu at 1,614 and Musanze at 1,157, both in the western and northern highlands, while the Eastern Province is the most thinly settled at 433.

=== Trade corridors and regional links ===
Rwanda shares strong cross-border trade and transport links with its neighbours. Key regional infrastructure routes include the Central Corridor, which connects Rwanda through Tanzania to the port of Dar es Salaam, and the Northern Corridor, linking the country via Uganda and Kenya to the port of Mombasa. These routes connect Rwanda to regional and international markets and support its economic integration within the East African Community (EAC).

== See also ==
- List of lakes of Rwanda
