= Lake Ruhondo =

Lake in Rwanda

Coordinates: 1.517°S 29.739°E

Ruhondo Beach resort
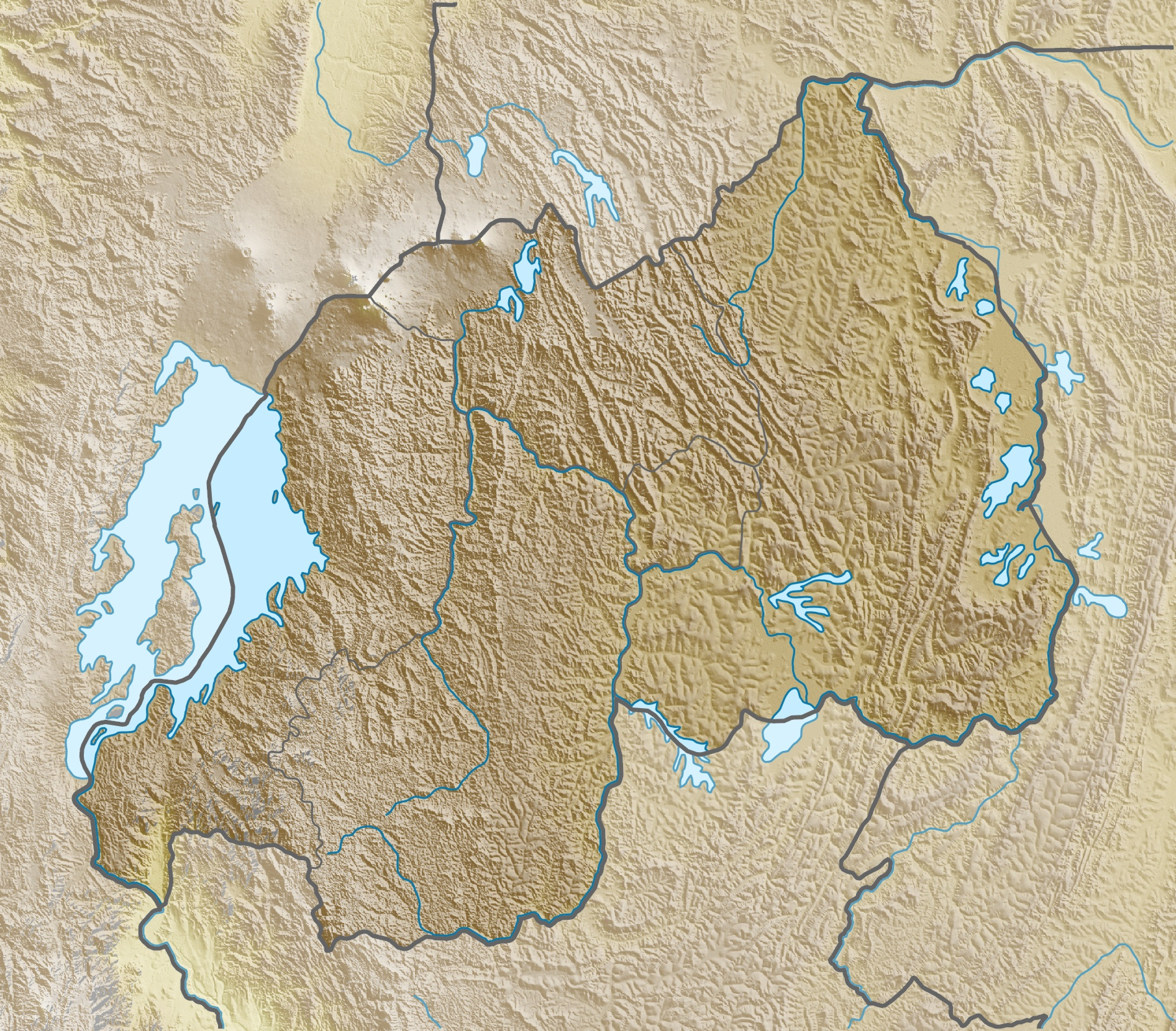
- Location within Rwanda
- Location: Musanze District
- Type: Natural freshwater lake
- Basin countries: Rwanda
- Max. length: 9.17 km (5.70 mi)
- Max. width: 4.55 km (2.83 mi)
- Islands: Various Islands

LAKE RUHONDO

Lake Ruhondo is a lake of northwestern Rwanda. It is located near Lake Bulera on the outskirts of Musanze. It is located at the base of Rwanda's largest volcano, the Kalisimbi Volcanic mountain.

Lake Ruhondo and is one of two lakes formed out of volcanic activity from Sabyinyo Volcanic mountain which caused outpouring of lava across a river valley that solidified and cooled. Lake Ruhondo is separated from Lake Burera by a 1 kilometre (0.62 mi) land mass. Both lakes Ruhondo and Burera are located in the Northern part of Rwanda and very close to Uganda on Rwanda's northern region. Lake Ruhondo straddles three districts namely: Burera Musanze and Gakenke. Lake Ruhondo receives its waters from Lake Burera at its southwestern extremity. It has an estimated area of 2800 ha. Lake Ruhondo receives water from other streams and drains to the southwest through the River Mukungwa which is a tributary of River Nyabarongo.

Water transportation is not well developed with individual small wooden boats as the means of transport.

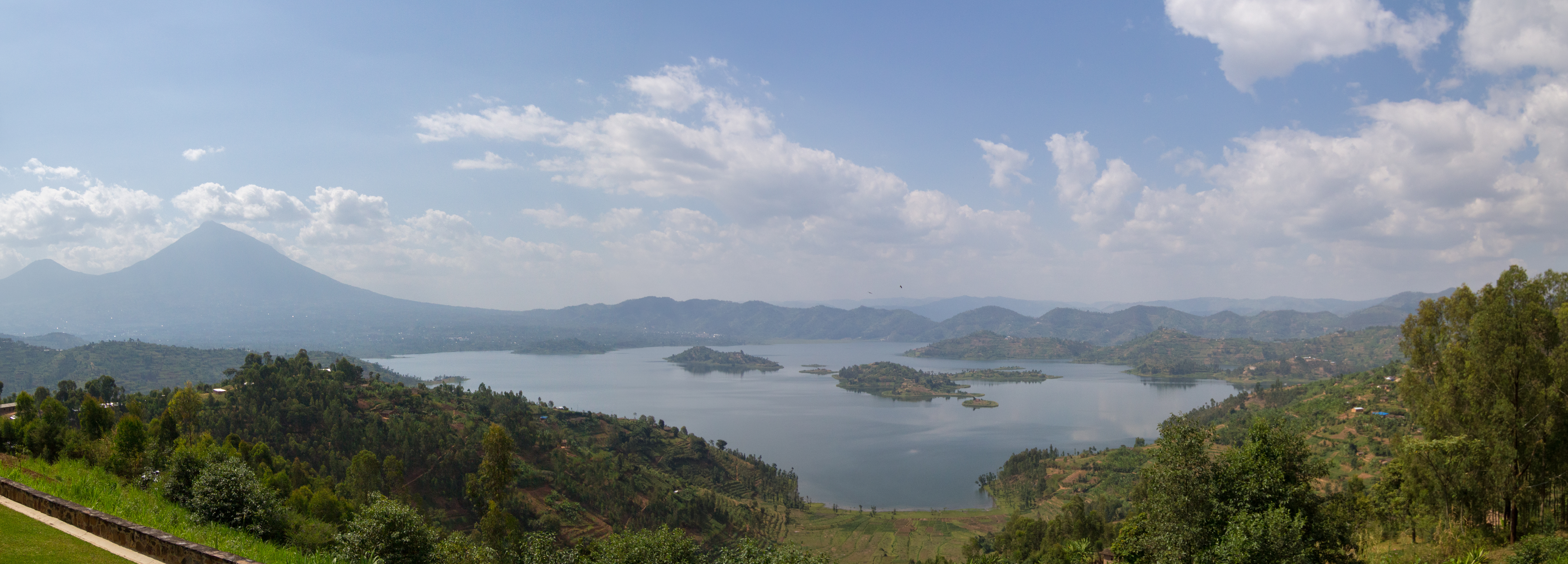
This is a panoramic of Lake Ruhondo in Northern Rwanda from 2015

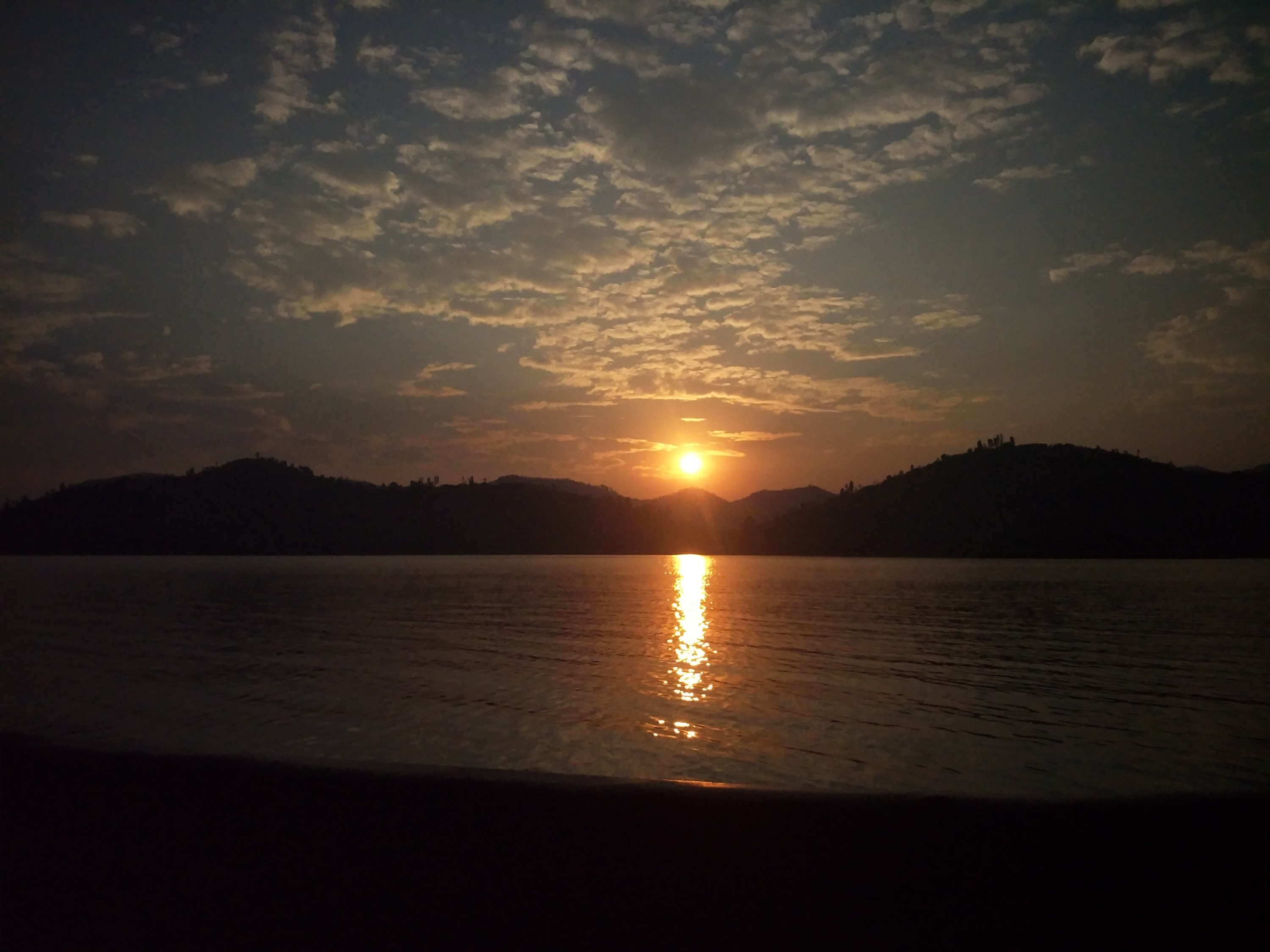
Ruhondo sunset
