= Lake Mugesera =

Lake in Rwanda

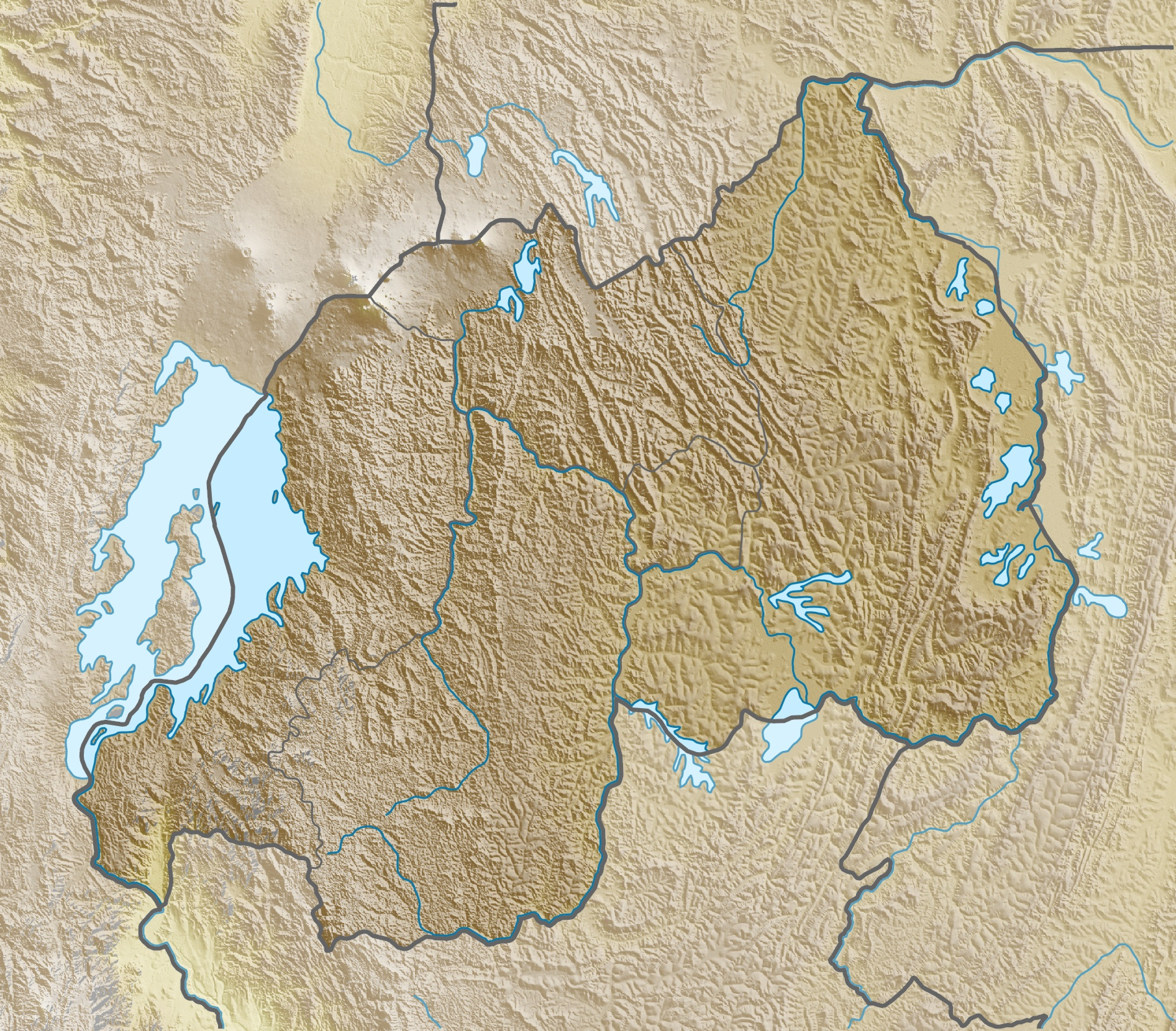
- Location within Rwanda
- Location: Rwanda
- Coordinates: 2°06′29″S 30°18′54″E
- Primary inflows: Nyabarongo River
- Basin countries: Rwanda
- Surface area: 4,000 hectares (9,900 acres)
- Surface elevation: 1,300 metres (4,300 ft)

Lake Mugesera is a lake in the Eastern Province, Rwanda.

The lake is in the Central Plateau, southeast of Kigali. The lake is part of a complex of lakes and wetlands in a flat valley running in a SSE direction, 35 kilometres (22 mi) wide. The Nyawarungu River meanders southward through the valley, flooding it to create a zone of permanent swamps and lakes. Lake Mugesera lies on the east bank of the river, and is the largest lake in the complex.

Although close to the equator, the climate is comparatively temperate due to the elevation. The rainy seasons are from March to May and again from September to December. The lake is fed by a number of rivers and minor streams originating on ridges to the north, east and south, which deliver most water during the rainy seasons. The water is generally around 25 °C (77 °F). Fish are abundant, and there are many species of waterbirds. Other animals include water turtles, crocodiles, monitors, snakes and otters.

In the 15th century the region around the lake was settled by the Hondogo lineage of Tutsi people, pastoralists who had formed an independent state. The Tutsi migrated to the Virunga region of Rwanda during the 15th and 16th centuries, settling between Lake Mugesera and Lake Muhazi. They gradually acquired power in most of the region of modern Rwanda, while intermarrying with the Hutu and becoming culturally assimilated by them.
