= Lake Ihema =

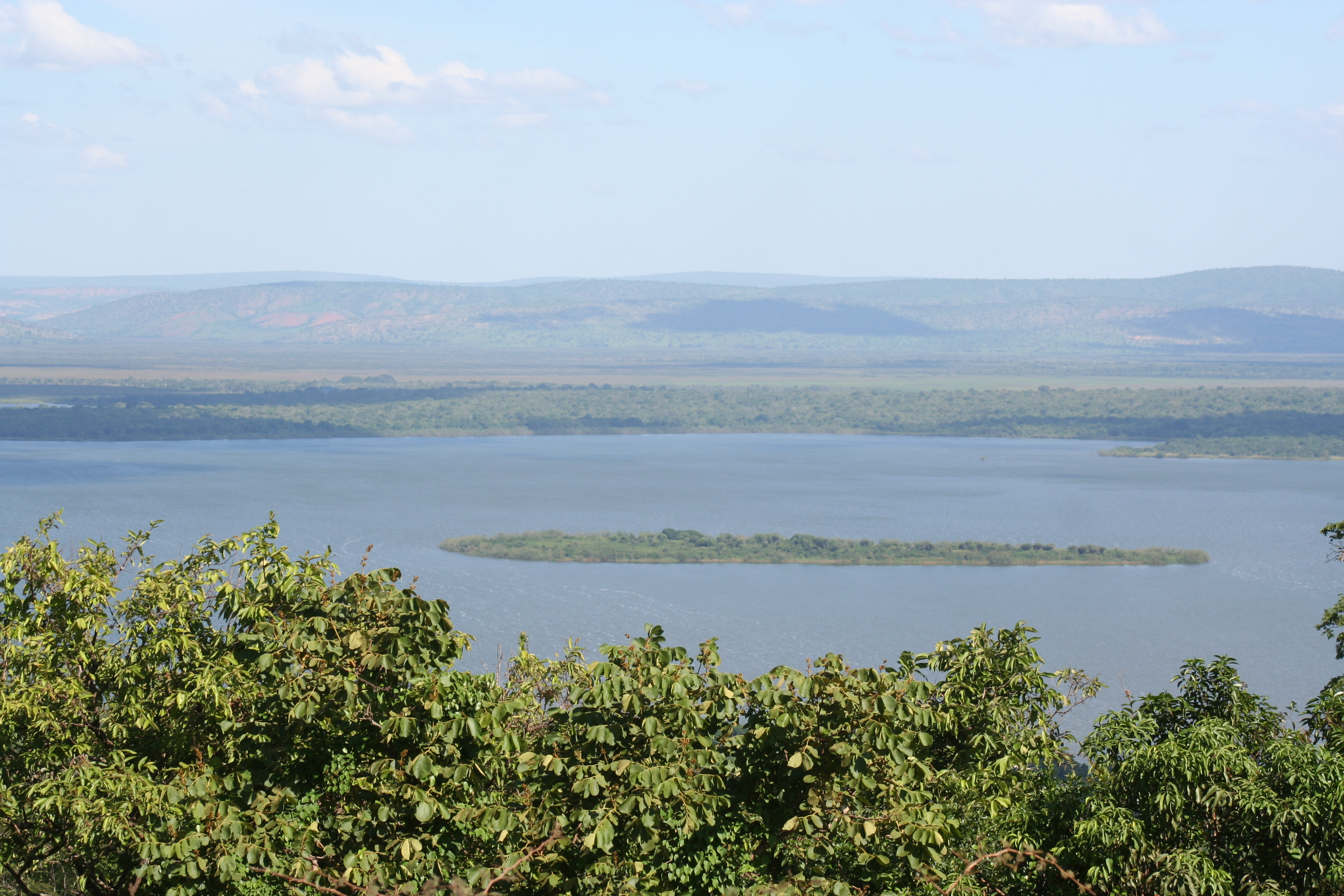

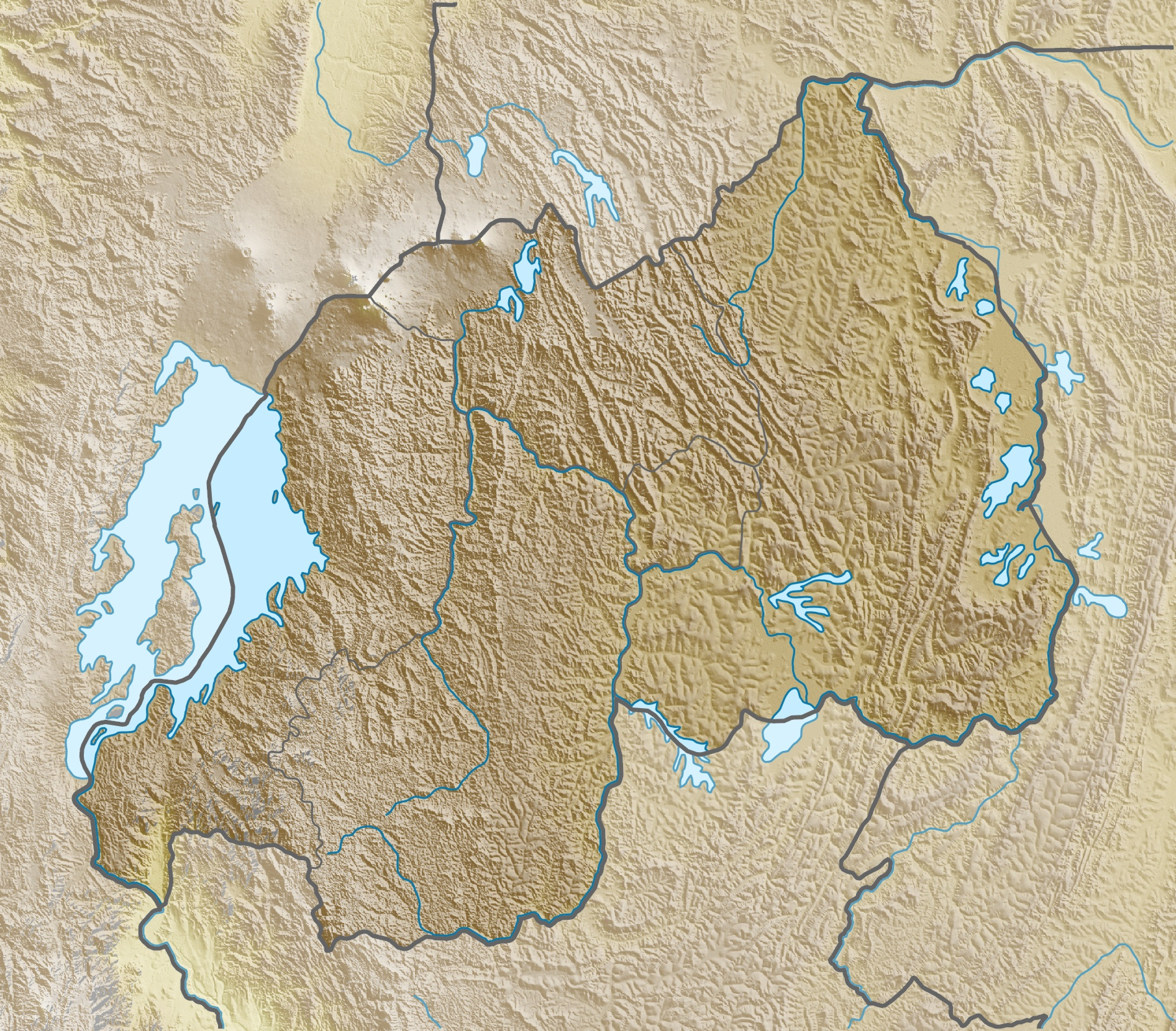
- Location within Rwanda
- Location: Rwanda
- Coordinates: 1°51′48″S 30°48′40″E
- Type: lake
- Surface area: 100 km^{2} (40 sq mi)
- Average depth: 5 m (16 ft)
- Max. depth: 7 m (23 ft)
- Surface elevation: 1,292 m (4,239 ft)

Lake Ihema is a lake in the east of Rwanda, at the border with Tanzania. The lake lies within the marshland of the Kagera River in which it empties via a very short channel. With an area of 100 km^{2} (40 sq mi), it is the largest lake entirely in Rwanda. Considering all other lakes in the country (including lakes shared with other countries), it would be the 3rd largest after Lake Kivu 2,700 km^{2} (1,040 sq mi) between Rwanda and the Democratic Republic of the Congo and Lake Rweru between Rwanda and Burundi at 133 km^{2} (50 sq mi) of which only 47 km^{2} (20 sq mi) are in Rwanda. The lake is located in Kayonza District in the southern part of Akagera National Park which contains more than another dozen of lakes, of which Ihema is the largest.

The lake is rich in biodiversity, except fish. It is home to hippopotamuses and crocodiles. It has 550 species of birds, including remarkable species such as the shoebill (Balaeniceps rex) and the papyrus gonolek (Laniarius mufumbiri). Among the endemic species, there are ibises, jacanas, herons, plovers, sandpipers, malachite kingfishers, hawks and many others.
