= Kimiromko =

Kimironko
- Sector
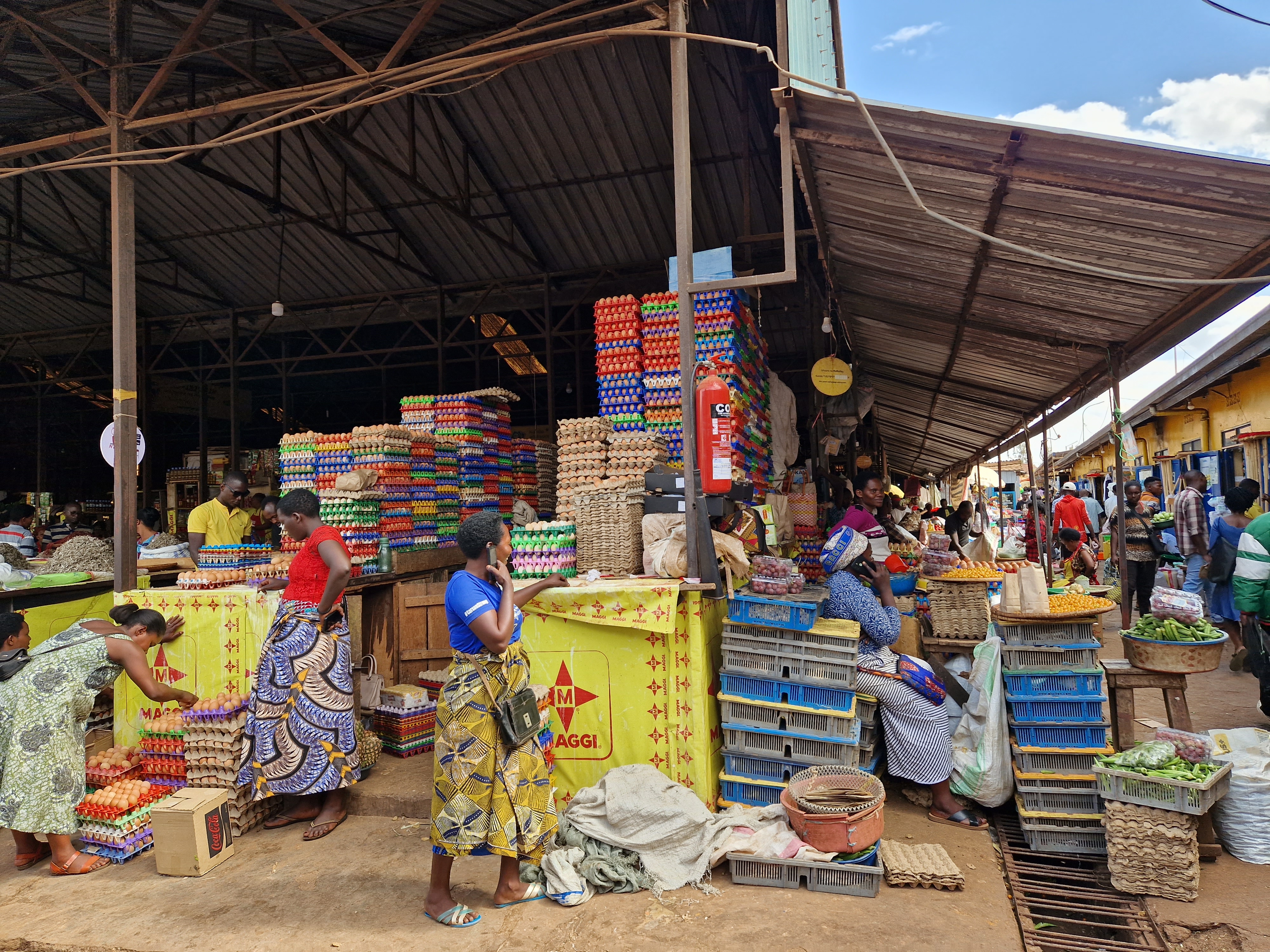
- Kimironko Market in the sector (2023)
- Interactive map of Kimironko
- Coordinates: 1.9384°S 30.1242°E
- Country: Rwanda
- Province: Kigali
- District: Gasabo District

Area
  - Total: 11.33 km^{2} (4.37 sq mi)

Population (2022 census)
  - Total: 61,733
  - Density: 5,449/km^{2} (14,110/sq mi)
- Time zone: UTC+2 (CAT)
- ISO 3166 code: RW-01

Kimironko (Kinyarwanda: Umurenge wa Kimironko) is one of the 15 sectors of Gasabo District in the city of Kigali, Rwanda.

== Geography ==
Kimironko covers an area of 11.3 km². The sector is divided into three cells: Bibare in the east, Kibagabaga in the northwest and Nyagatovu in the southwest. Its administrative seat is located in the southeastern part of Kibagabaga. Neighbouring sectors are Bumbogo to the northeast, Ndera to the east, Nyarugunga to the southeast, Remera to the southwest and west, and Kinyinya to the northwest.

== Population ==
According to the 2022 census, Kimironko had a population of 61,733. Ten years earlier, its population was 57,430, corresponding to an average annual population increase of 0.73 percent between 2012 and 2022.

== Parks and cemeteries ==
The Nyandungu Urban Wetland Eco-Tourism Park is located directly east of the sector.

Remera Cemetery, known as Iwabo wa twese, is located in Nyagatovu. The cemetery was closed to further burials in 2011 because of overcrowding, and a new cemetery for the district was opened in Rusororo.

== Education and healthcare ==
The Kibagabaga Level Two Teaching Hospital is located in Kibagabaga. The College of Medicine and Health Sciences is also located on Kigali 11 Avenue in Nyagatovu.

== Economy ==
Kimironko Market is located in Bibare and is the largest of the officially designated markets in Gasabo District.
