= Kinyinya, Kigali =

Kinyinya
- Sector
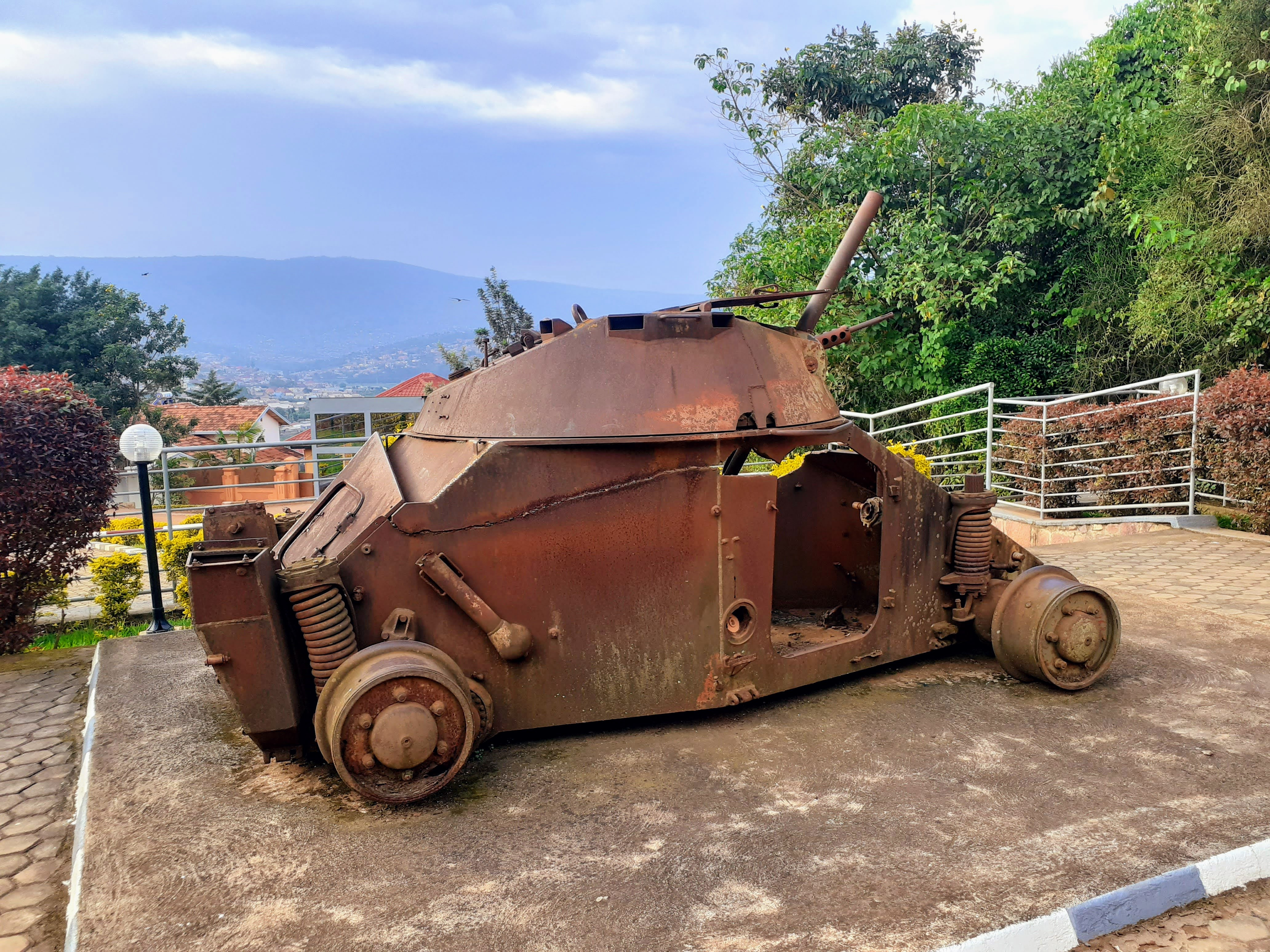
- Preserved remains of a tank as a monument in Kagugu
- Interactive map of Kinyinya
- Coordinates: 1.9089°S 30.0965°E
- Country: Rwanda
- Province: Kigali
- District: Gasabo District

Area
  - Total: 24.20 km^{2} (9.34 sq mi)

Population (2022 census)
  - Total: 125,400
  - Density: 5,182/km^{2} (13,420/sq mi)
- Time zone: UTC+2 (CAT)
- ISO 3166 code: RW-01

Kinyinya sector (Kinyarwanda: Umurenge wa Kinyinya) is one of the 15 sectors of Gasabo District in the city of Kigali, Rwanda.

== Geography ==
Kinyinya covers an area of 24.2 km². The sector is divided into four cells: Gacuriro, Gasharu, Kagugu and Murama. Neighbouring sectors are Nduba to the north, Bumbogo to the east, Kimironko to the southeast, Remera and Kacyiru to the south, Gisozi to the west and Jabana to the northwest.

== Population ==
According to the 2022 census, Kinyinya had a population of 125,400. Ten years earlier, its population was 57,846, corresponding to an average annual population increase of 8.1 percent between 2012 and 2022.

== Sights ==
The remains of a tank in Rukinga, in Kagugu cell, commemorate the fighting that ended the 1994 genocide. The vehicle was disabled by soldiers of the Rwandan Patriotic Army (RPA). Another monument depicts two soldiers firing a machine gun.
