= Jabana =

Sector in the city of Kigali, Rwanda

Coordinates: 1.8778°S 30.0728°E

- Country: Rwanda
- Provinces: City of Kigali
- Districts: Gasabo

Area
  - Total: 36.38 km^{2} (14.05 sq mi)
- Elevation: 1,607 m (5,272 ft)

Population
  - Total: 63,862
  - Density: 1,755/km^{2} (4,550/sq mi)
- Time zone: UTC+2

Jabana is a sector in Gasabo District, Kigali, Rwanda.

== Location ==
The city has an area of 36.4 km. It is located in the northern part of the country. Jabana contains five cells: Akamatamu, Bweramvura, Kabuye, Kidashya, and Ngiryi. It is bordered by the Kinyinya and Gisozi sectors in the south, Nduba to the east, Masoro and Murambi to the north, and Jali to the west. The Nyabugogo river, a tributary of the Nyabarongo, borders the sector in the east.

Gasabo District is divided into 10 sectors (imirenge): Bumbogo, Gatsata, Gikomero, Gisozi, Jabana, Jali, Kacyiru, Kimihurura, Kimironko, Kinyinya, Ndera, Nduba, Remera, Rusororo, and Rutunga.

== Demographics ==
The population according to the 2012 census was 33,577 people. It had a gender ratio of 16,718 males to 16,859 females.

According to the 2022 census, the sector had a population of 63,862 people, corresponding to an annual population increase of 6.6%. The gender ratios for 2022 were

- Males 31,600
- Females 32,262

The Rwanda Environment Management Authority hypothesised that the high male-to-female ratio was due to a tendency for men to migrate to the city in search of work outside the agricultural sector, while their wives remained in a rural home.

As of 2022 it had a 64.7% Urban rate, and a 35.3 rural rate. It is quite young with 36.3% of the population be under 15, with 61.2% of the population being between 15 and 64 years old. Only 2.4% of the population is over 65.

== Transportation ==
National Road 3 runs parallel to the Nyabugogo river.
