= Remera, Kigali =

Coordinates: 01°56′51.36″S 30°06′21.96″E

Remera
- Sector
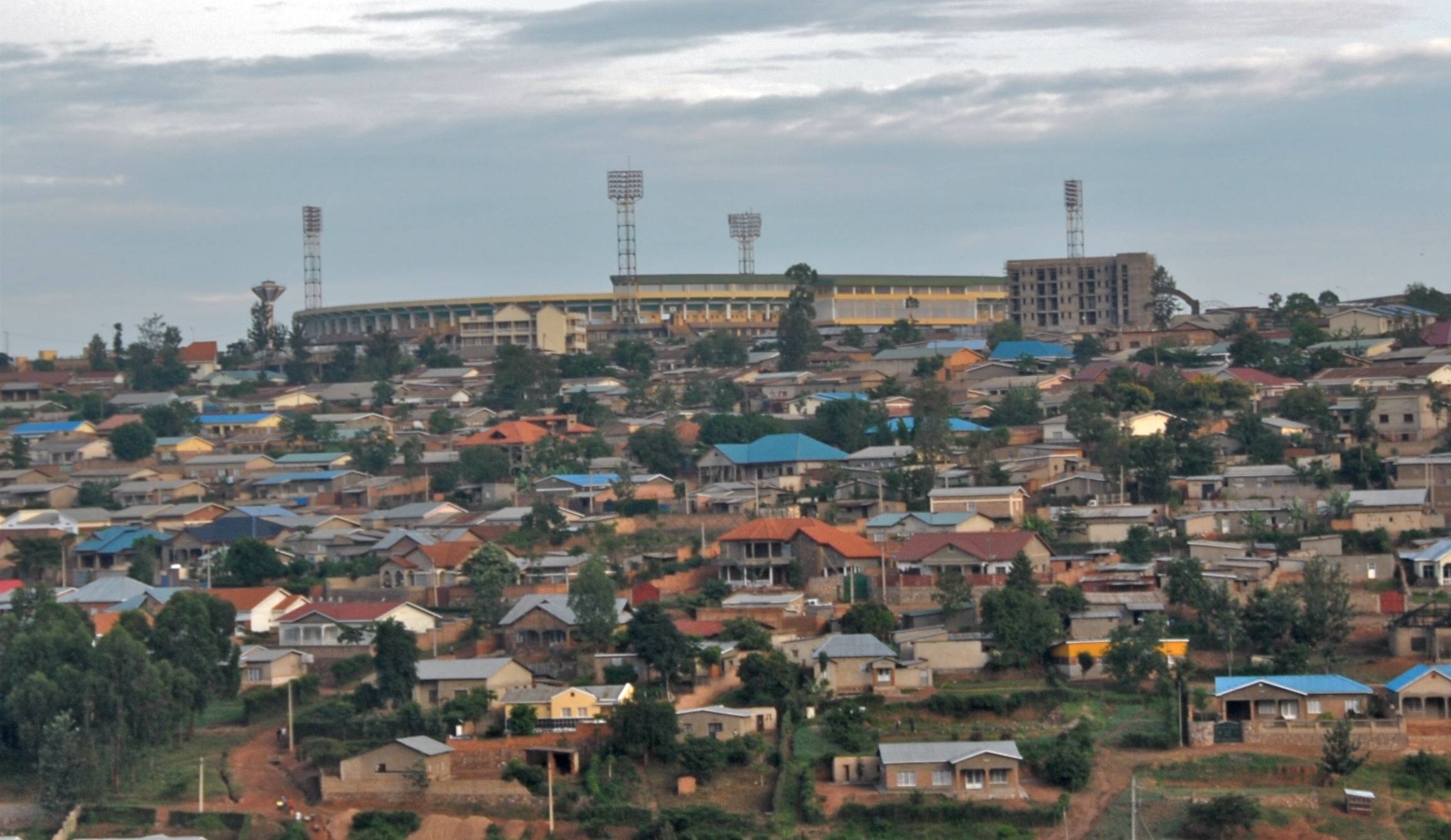

- Location in Rwanda
- Country: Rwanda
- Province: Kigali
- District: Gasabo District

Area
  - Total: 7.3 km^{2} (2.8 sq mi)
- Elevation: 1,450 m (4,760 ft)

Population (2022 census)
  - Total: 38,648
  - Density: 5,300/km^{2} (14,000/sq mi)

Remera is one of 15 sectors in the district of Gasabo in the capital Kigali of Rwanda.

== Geography ==
Remera covers an area of 7.3 km² and lies at an altitude of about 1,450 meters. The sector is divided into four cells: Rukiri I, Rukiri II, Nyabisindu and Nyarutarama. Neighboring sectors are Kinyinya in the north, Kimironko in the east, Niboye in the south, Kicukiro in the southwest, Kimihurura in the west and Kacyiru in the northwest.

== Demographics ==
According to the census of 2022, the population was 38,648. Ten years earlier, it was 43,279, which corresponds to an annual population decrease of 1.1 percent between 2012 and 2022.

== Culture ==
The Rukiri II part of the sector, which includes the Stade Amahoro and the BK Arena, is home to the largest sports facilities in Kigali.
