= Kinyinya Genocide Memorial =

Memorial for the Rwandan genocide

Coordinates: 1.9311°S 30.0598°E

The Kinyinya Genocide Memorial is a memorial site located in Kinyinya, Gasabo District, Kigali, Rwanda. It commemorates the victims of the 1994 genocide against the Tutsi and serves as a burial site and a place of remembrance and commemoration.

== Location ==

Some memorials of the 1994 Genocide against the Tutsi in Rwanda.

=== Setting ===
The memorial is located in the Kinyinya sector of Gasabo District, within the city of Kigali. It lies in an urban area of Kigali where local commemorative ceremonies for the genocide against the Tutsi are held.

=== Context ===
The site forms part of the network of memorial sites dedicated to victims of the genocide against the Tutsi throughout Rwanda. These sites serve as burial and remembrance places and contribute to historical education and commemoration.

Four genocide memorial sites in Rwanda are inscribed as a serial World Heritage Site by UNESCO: Nyamata, Murambi, Gisozi and Bisesero.

== History ==
Communes of Rwanda in 1994.

The Kinyinya Genocide Memorial is one of the memorial sites established after the 1994 genocide against the Tutsi. It is associated with the preservation of the memory of victims in Kigali, where several memorial and burial sites commemorate massacres carried out during the genocide.

In 2025, a local commemoration ceremony held in Kinyinya honoured victims of the genocide against the Tutsi. According to Top Africa News, 441 victims were buried at the Kinyinya Genocide Memorial at that time.

In 2026, the local commemoration in Kinyinya addressed the history of violence committed in the sector during the genocide, including through survivor testimonies and remembrance activities organised with local authorities.

== Features ==
The Kinyinya Genocide Memorial is located in Murama, in the Kinyinya sector of Gasabo District. It serves as a burial site and a place of remembrance and commemoration for victims of the genocide against the Tutsi in this part of Kigali.

According to testimony collected during the 32nd commemoration of the genocide against the Tutsi in Kinyinya, Tutsi living on Kinyinya Hill were attacked by soldiers of the regime of Juvénal Habyarimana and members of the Interahamwe militia. The memorial preserves a list of 411 names of Tutsi killed on the hill. The list continues to be updated when additional victims are identified.

The site is also associated with the remembrance of members of the local school community. In May 2025, a commemoration organised by Groupe Scolaire Kinyinya began at the Kinyinya Genocide Memorial in Murama before continuing at the school. During the ceremony, the names of 12 teachers and six pupils from the former Kinyinya Primary School who were killed during the genocide were publicly commemorated.

The memorial forms part of Rwanda's national network of genocide remembrance sites. Work to identify genocide sites records massacre locations, mass graves, burial sites and places of commemoration in order to document the events and preserve physical traces of the genocide.

The site hosts remembrance ceremonies organised as part of Kwibuka, in accordance with Rwandan legislation governing commemorations of the genocide against the Tutsi.

== See also ==
=== Related articles ===
- Rwandan genocide
- List of Rwandan genocide memorials
- Kinyinya, Kigali
- Gasabo District
- Kigali
- Kigali Genocide Memorial

=== Further reading ===
- National Commission for the Fight against Genocide (2019). Jenoside yakorewe Abatutsi mu yahoze ari Kigali Ngali (PDF) (in Kinyarwanda). Kigali: National Commission for the Fight against Genocide.
- National Commission for the Fight against Genocide (2019). Identification des sites du génocide d’avril à juillet 1994 (PDF) (in French). Kigali: National Commission for the Fight against Genocide.
- Philippe Denis (2022). The Genocide against the Tutsi, and the Rwandan Churches: Between Grief and Denial. Religion in Transforming Africa. Vol. 9. Woodbridge: James Currey. p. 358. ISBN 978-1-84701-290-6.

=== External links ===
- "Kinyinya Honors Victims of the Genocide Against the Tutsi in 31st Commemoration Ceremony". Top Africa News.
- "Borrowed Lights and Bitter Truths: The 1994 Genocide against the Tutsi in Kinyinya". Top Africa News.
- "Genocide Memorials". Genocide Archive Rwanda.
