= Mount Jali =

Mountain near Kigali, Rwanda

- Mount Jari, Jali Hill
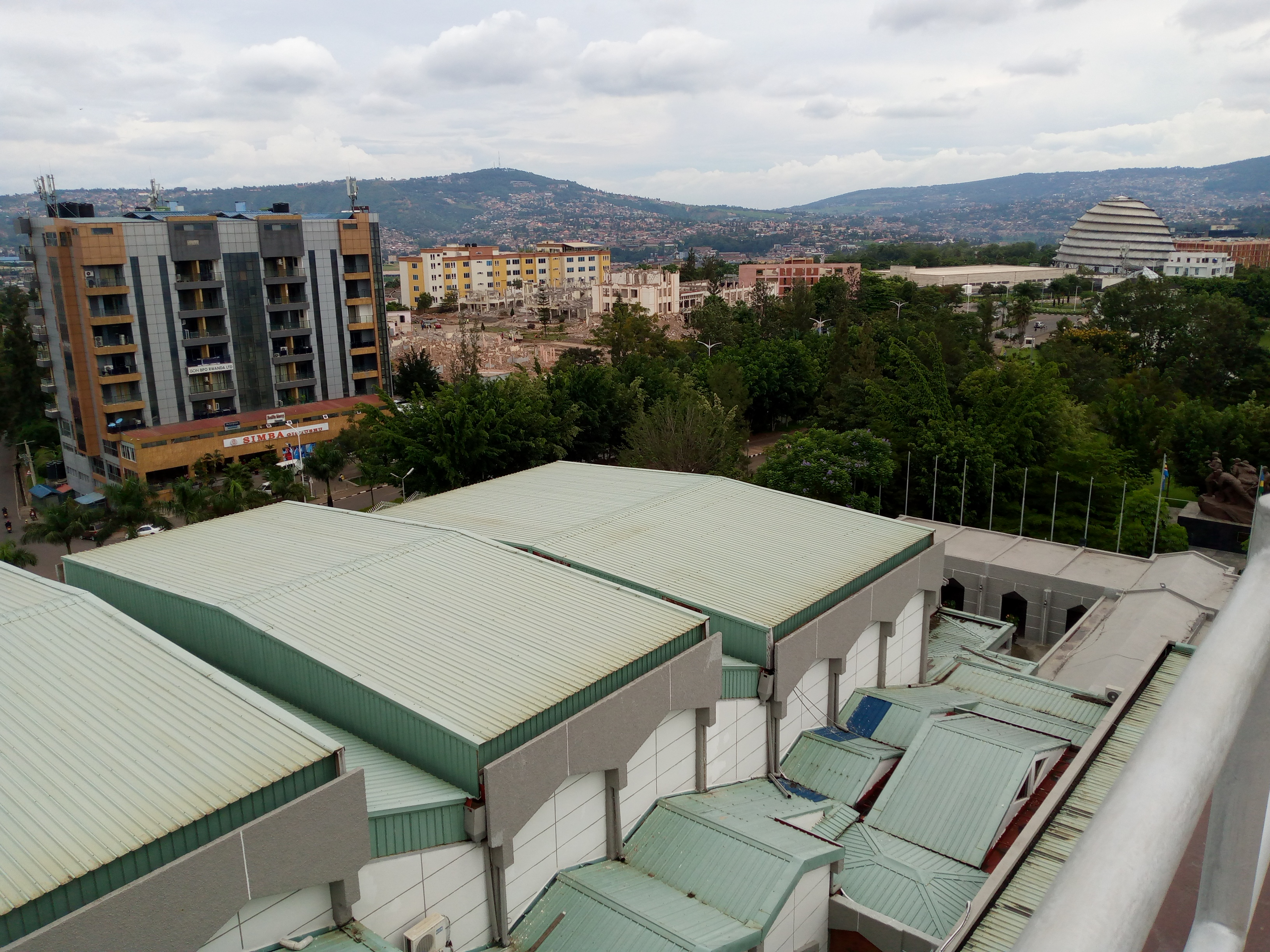
- View of Mount Jali from Kigali.

Highest point
- Elevation: 2,071 m (6,795 ft)
- Coordinates: 1.883863°S 30.015799°E

Geography
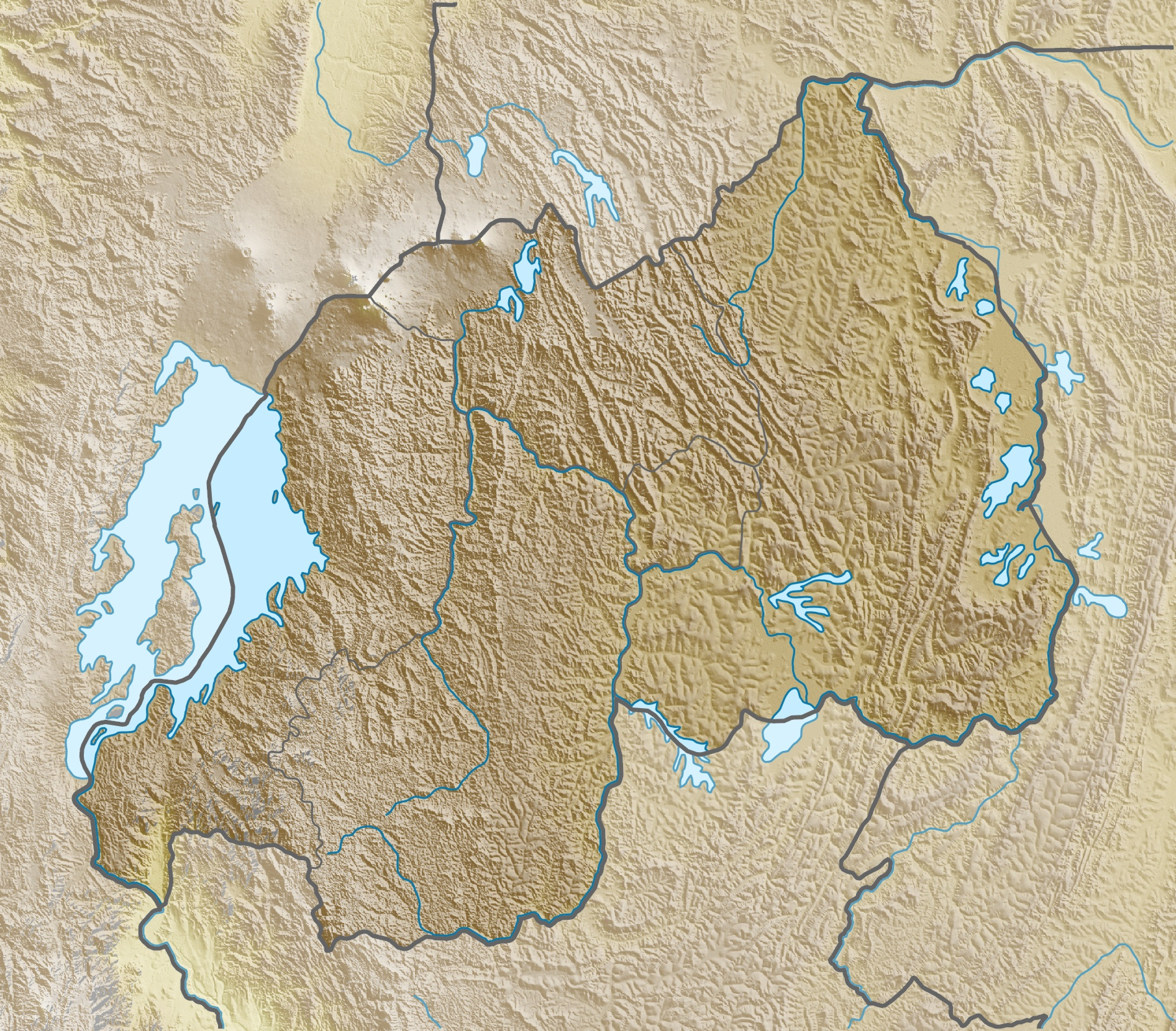
- Location within Rwanda
- Province: Kigali
- District: Gasabo

Mount Jali, also known as Jali Hill (sometimes rendered Jari), is a mountain situated in Gasabo District, Kigali, Rwanda. Its summit reaches an elevation of 2,071 metres (6,795 ft) above sea level, making it one of the prominent hills in the vicinity of the Rwandan capital. The mountain is notable for hosting the Kigali Solaire photovoltaic power station and a radio transmission system.

== Geography ==
Mount Jali lies within Gasabo District, one of the three districts that comprise the city of Kigali, Rwanda's capital. The mountain rises to a summit elevation of 2,078 metres (6,795 ft) above sea level. It forms part of the hilly terrain that characterises the landscape of Kigali and its surroundings, a region situated on a series of ridges and valleys in the central highlands of Rwanda. The mountain's elevated position has made it a suitable location for infrastructure installations serving the wider Kigali area.

== Facilities ==
In 2007, the Kigali Solaire photovoltaic power station, with a capacity of 250 kW, was constructed on the mountain in partnership with Mainzer Stadtwerke, a utility company based in Mainz, Germany. The mountain is also used for a radio transmission system.
