= Jean de Dieu Kamuhanda =

Rwandan politician

- Born: 3 March 1953 (age 73); Gikomero, Rwanda-Burundi
- Occupation: Minister of Higher Education
- Political party: Republican Democratic Movement
- Conviction: Crime against humanity
- Penalty: Life imprisonment

Details
- Imprisoned at: Malí

Jean de Dieu Kamuhanda (born 3 March 1953) is a Rwandan politician who was sentenced to life imprisonment by the International Criminal Tribunal for Rwanda (ICTR) for his role in the 1994 Rwandan Genocide.

Kamuhanda was born in Gikomero, Rwanda. On 25 May 1994, he became the Minister of Higher Education, Scientific Research and Culture in the interim government led by Jean Kambanda.

In early April 1994, shortly after the beginning of the Rwandan Genocide, Kamuhanda gave a speech in Gikomero where he pointed out that the killing of Tutsis in Gikomero had not yet commenced and that he was willing to provide the weapons that would be necessary to carry out the killings there. At the end of the speech he handed out firearms, grenades, and machetes to those in attendance, and said he would follow up with the residents of Gikomero to ensure that the killings had begun. On 12 April 1994, Kamuhanda gave the orders to the Interahamwe militias the police to commence the killing of Tutsis who had taken refuge in a Protestant church's school in Gikomero.

In late July, Kamuhanda fled to France. At the request of the prosecutor of the ICTR, he was arrested by French officials in Bourges on 26 November 1999. On 7 March 2000, he was sent to the detention facilities of the ICTR in Arusha, Tanzania.

At his trial, Kamuhanda was convicted of genocide and of extermination as a crime against humanity. He was acquitted of conspiracy to commit genocide, rape as a crime against humanity, and war crimes and other inhumane acts as a crime against humanity. He was sentenced to life imprisonment. His sentence was affirmed by the Appeals Chamber of the ICTR on 19 September 2005 and on 7 December 2008 he was transferred to Mali to serve his sentence.
