= Nature tourism =

Type of tourism

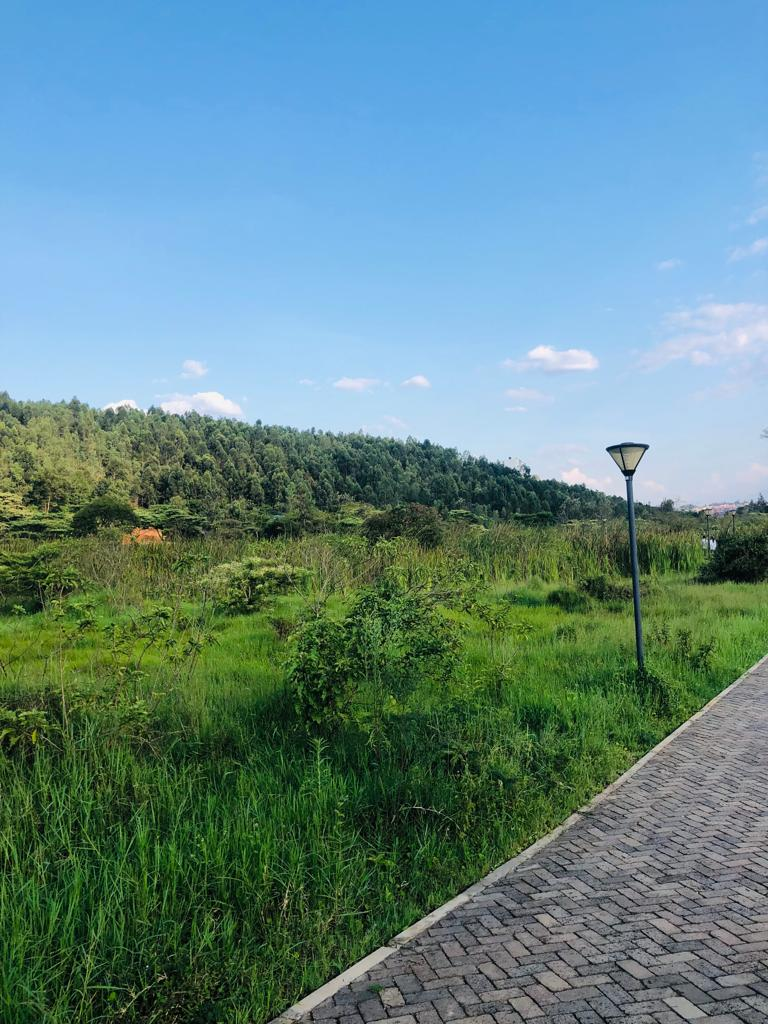
View of nature in the Nyandungu Eco Tourism Park

Nature tourism is tourism based on the natural attractions of an area, including its flora and fauna. It can overlap with wildlife tourism, and adventure tourism, and includes ecotourism, which specifically focuses environmental education and environmental conservation. It includes tourism for stargazing purposes, and many other variants, for example cycling tourism and birdwatching tourism. National parks has become closely associated with nature tourism. Nature tourism can have negative impacts on the environment, and practices exist for minimizing this.

It can help promote conservation by making remaining natural areas more valuable to local communities and landowners.
