= Gikomero =

- Sector
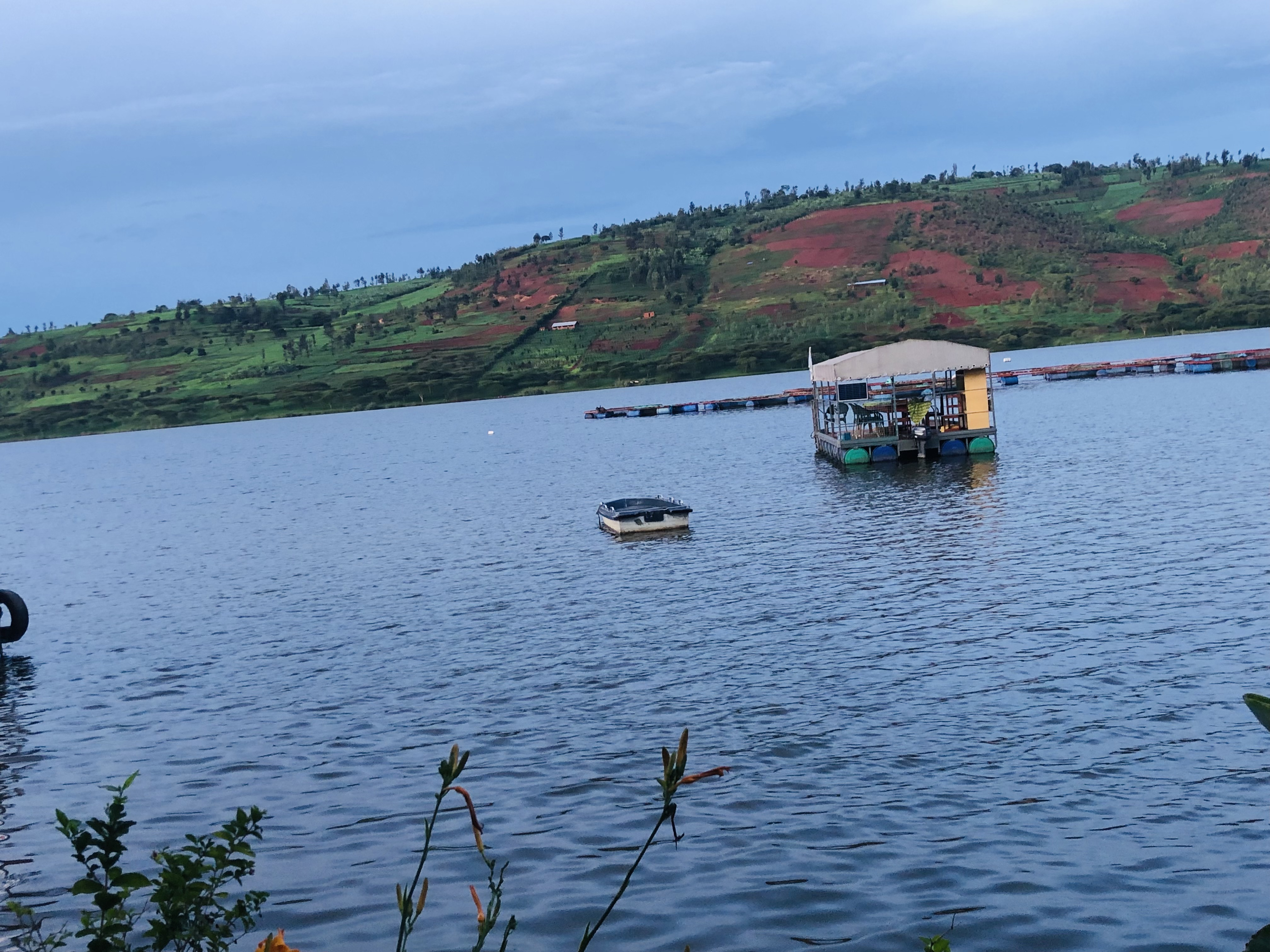
- Lake Muhazi in the north of the sector
- Interactive map of Gikomero
- Coordinates: 1.8749°S 30.2290°E
- Country: Rwanda
- Province: Kigali
- District: Gasabo District

Area
  - Total: 35.06 km^{2} (13.54 sq mi)

Population (2022 census)
  - Total: 19,630
  - Density: 559.9/km^{2} (1,450/sq mi)
- Time zone: UTC+2 (CAT)
- ISO 3166 code: RW-01

Gikomero (Kinyarwanda: Umurenge wa Gikomero) is one of the 15 sectors of Gasabo District in the city of Kigali, Rwanda.

== Geography ==
Gikomero covers an area of 35.1 km². The sector is divided into five cells: Gasagara, Gicaca, Kibara, Munini and Murambi. Its administrative seat is located in Munini. Neighbouring sectors are Bukure to the north, Fumbwe to the east, Rusororo to the south, Ndera to the southwest, Bumbogo to the west and Rutunga to the northwest. Gikomero borders Lake Muhazi in the north.

== Population ==
According to the 2022 census, Gikomero had a population of 19,630. Ten years earlier, its population was 16,625, corresponding to an average annual population increase of 1.7 percent between 2012 and 2022.
