= Rusororo =

- Sector
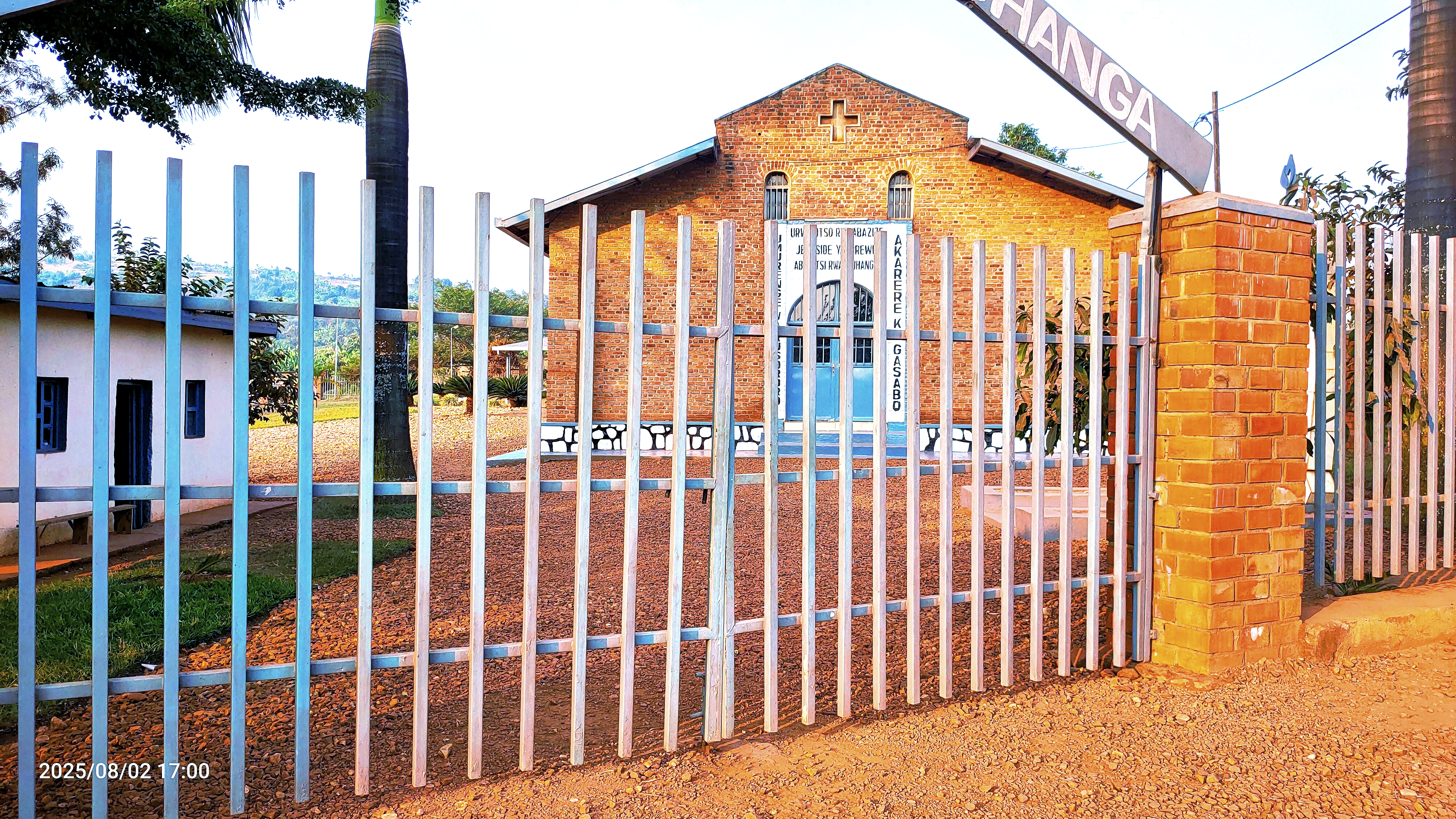
- Ruhanga Genocide Memorial
- Interactive map of Rusororo
- Coordinates: 1.9365°S 30.2359°E
- Country: Rwanda
- Province: Kigali
- District: Gasabo District

Area
  - Total: 52.23 km^{2} (20.17 sq mi)

Population (2022 census)
  - Total: 61,787
  - Density: 1,183/km^{2} (3,064/sq mi)
- Time zone: UTC+2 (CAT)
- ISO 3166 code: RW-01

Rusororo (Kinyarwanda: Umurenge wa Rusororo) is one of the 15 sectors of Gasabo District in the city of Kigali, Rwanda.

== Geography ==
Rusororo covers an area of 52.2 km^{2}. The sector is divided into nine cells: Akagari, Bisenga, Gasagara, Kabuga I, Kabuga II, Kinyana, Mbandazi, Nyagahinga and Ruhanga. Neighbouring sectors are Gikomero to the north, Fumbwe to the northeast, Gahengeri to the east, Muyumbu to the southeast, Masaka to the south, Nyarugunga to the southwest and Ndera to the west. The eastern boundary of the sector follows a watercourse that flows south and empties into the Nyabarongo River in Kicukiro District.

== Population ==
According to the 2022 census, Rusororo had a population of 61,787 and a population density of 1,183 inhabitants per km^{2}. Ten years earlier, its population was 35,453, corresponding to an average annual population increase of 5.7 percent between 2012 and 2022.

== History ==
During the 1994 genocide against the Tutsi, thousands of Tutsi sought refuge in the Ruhanga Episcopal Anglican Church in what is now Ruhanga cell. The refugees were still able to repel an attack on 14 April, but on 15 April 1994 they were surrounded and killed by soldiers and Interahamwe. According to Rwandan accounts, around 25,000 people are believed to have died on the church grounds. Only a few survived.

== Sights ==
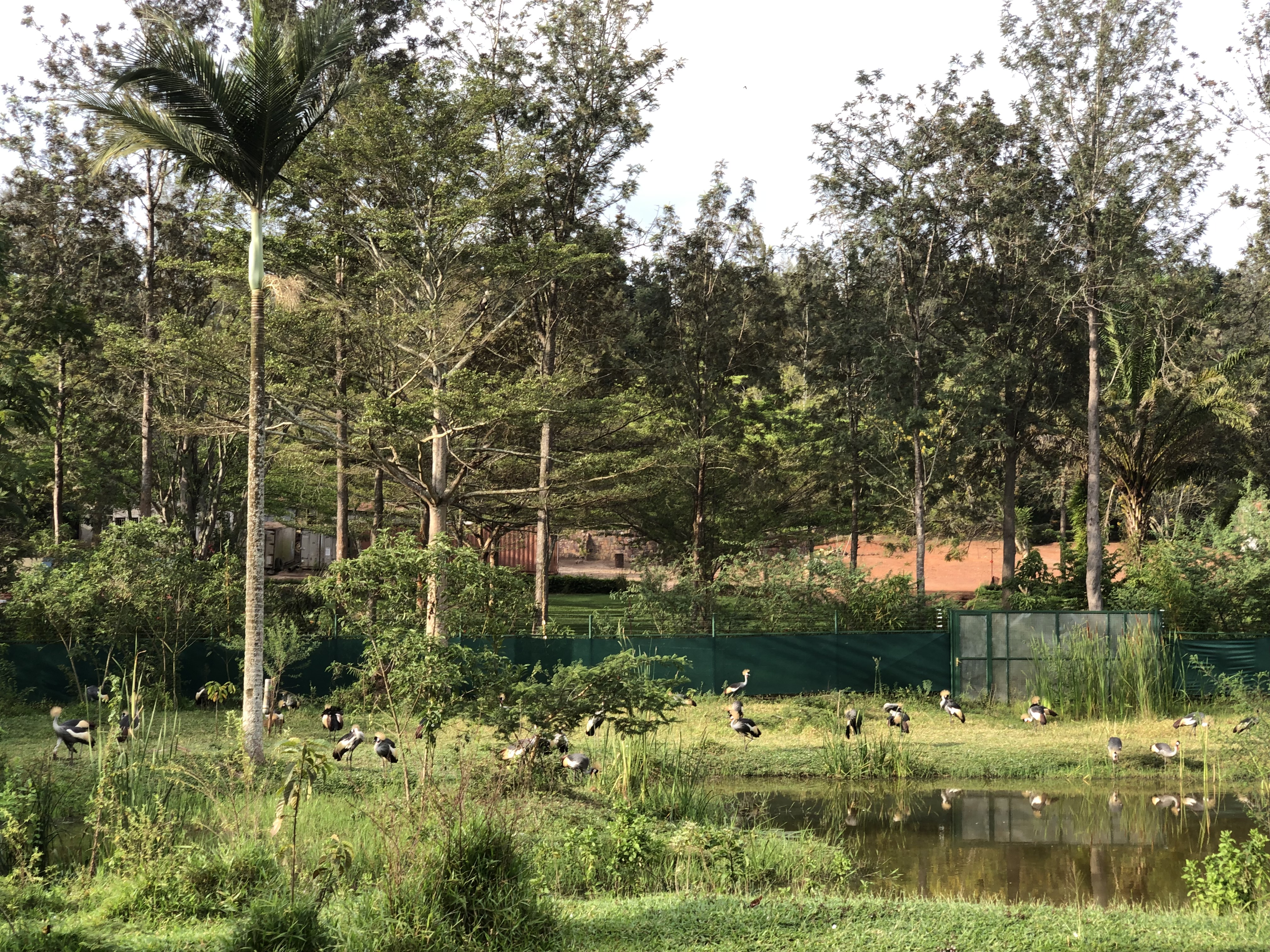
More than 50 grey crowned cranes live at Umusambi Village.

Like several other churches in Rwanda that were sites of massacres during the genocide, the former Anglican church in Ruhanga was converted into a memorial and resting place for the victims. More than 36,000 victims have been buried at the Ruhanga Genocide Memorial, including those killed in the massacre on the church grounds and others murdered in the surrounding area. A commemoration ceremony is held annually on 15 April, the date of the massacre.

In Kabuga II cell, a new cemetery was opened in 2011 after the old cemetery in the district had reached capacity. Rusororo Cemetery was initially laid out on an area of 12 hectares, which was intended to provide space for 13,200 graves and to be sufficient for 18 years if the death rate remained unchanged.

In Nyagahinga, in the far southwest of Rusororo on the border with Kicukiro District, lies Umusambi Village. The restored wetland, which is open to visitors, is home to numerous grey crowned cranes that cannot be released into the wild because of various injuries. The species is classified as endangered by the International Union for Conservation of Nature (IUCN).

== Economy and transport ==
Publicly designated markets are located in the cells of Mbandazi and Nyagahinga.

The paved National Road 4 runs parallel to the eastern boundary of the sector.
