= Kanombe =

Kanombe may refer to:

- Kanombe Airport
- Kicukiro District § Sectors
