= École Belge de Kigali =

International school in Kigali, Rwanda

Ecole Belge de Kigali

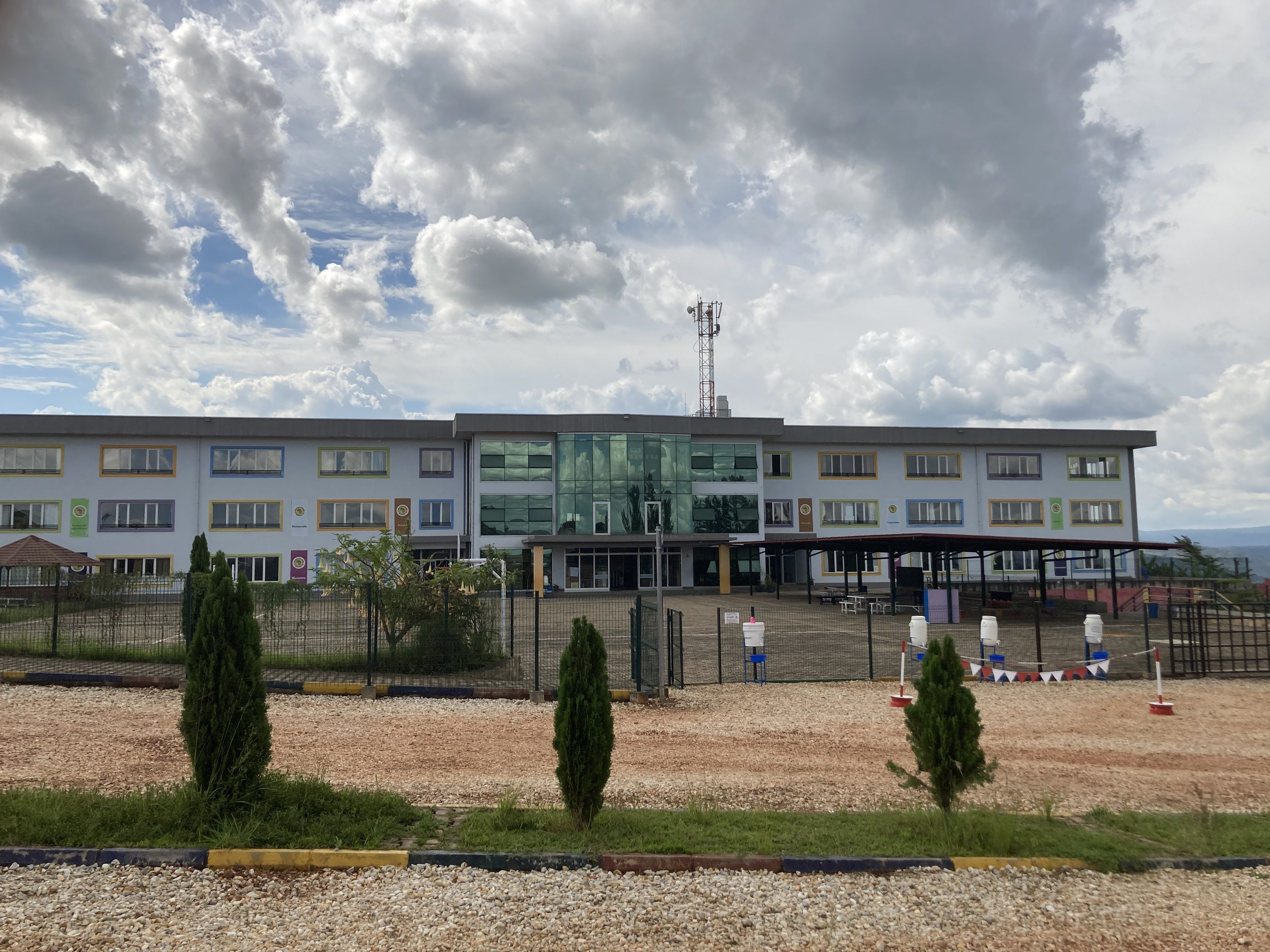

Location
- KG 784 St; Gisozi, Kigali, Rwanda
- Coordinates: 1.9139°S 30.0561°E

Information
- Type: Private, International
- Established: 1965
- Principal: Vico Delphine
- Teaching staff: 44 (2025)
- Classes offered: PK, KG, primary, secondary
- Language: French, English, Dutch
- Website: ebk-rw.com

The École Belge de Kigali (EBK, "Belgian School of Kigali") is an International school in Kigali, Rwanda.

The school follows the curriculum defined by the Federation Wallonie-Bruxelles of Belgium (French speaking community)

The school offers (pre-)kindergarten, elementary school and secondary school (ISCED level 0 to 3). Students are a mix of expatriates and Rwandans. It is a part of the Association des écoles à programme belge à l'étranger (AEBE).

Teaching is mainly in French, and offers advanced English lessons.

== History ==
The Belgian School was founded in 1965 by the Belgian authorities for the children of the Belgian community in Rwanda. It rapidly opened to Rwandans children and other nationalities.

In 2018, the school moved from its historical location in Kiyovu to a new building in Gisozi.

During the COVID-19 crisis of 2020–2021, the school succeeded in maintaining schooling, using both online and on site education, being one of the first international school to fully implement the plans of the Rwandan ministry of education.

== Students ==
As of September 2022, 540 students are enrolled at the EBK.

As of April 2010 students included children of government ministers and of Rwandans who do not send their children abroad to study. As of the same month the son of the Prime Minister of Rwanda and the children of the Minister of Defence went to the school.

Circa 1980 10% of the students were Rwandan and the remainder were foreigners, including, in 1978–1979, five Americans who were children of employees of the U.S. embassy. Admission of Belgian nationals was guaranteed, while admission of other foreign nationalities were not guaranteed.

== Curriculum ==
The Belgian school follows the official curriculum of the Belgian French Community's ministry of education. The certificates delivered by the EBK are fully recognised as official Belgian certificates, and can therefore easily be recognised by other European countries or non-European countries.

Classes are mainly given in French. English classes are compulsory for every students in primary and secondary school. English classes are organised in 3 levels per classes, (beginner, Intermediate and advanced). To ensure a perfect compatibility and smooth transition from and to the education system in Belgium, Dutch classes are also available (as an option) in both primary and secondary school.

The EBK also organises extracurricular activities, proposing a lot of cultural or sport options to students of all ages.

== See also ==
- Belgium–Rwanda relations
