= Belgium–Rwanda relations =

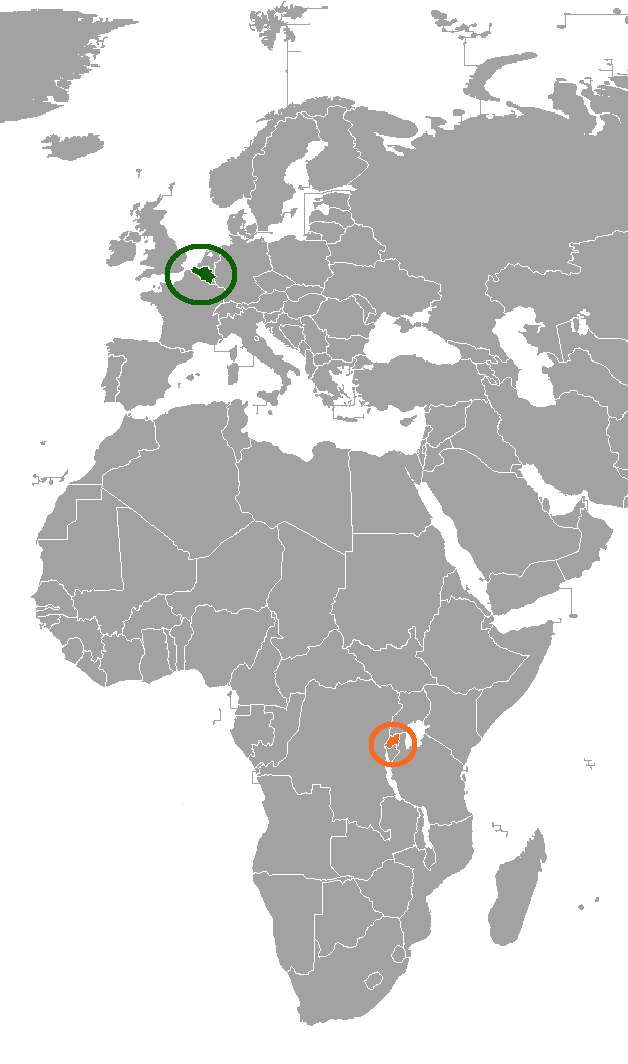
- Belgium: Rwanda

Diplomatic mission
- Embassy of Belgium, Kigali: Embassy of Rwanda, Brussels

Envoy
- Vacant: Vacant

Belgium–Rwanda relations refer to the international and diplomatic relations between Belgium and Rwanda.

Belgian relations with Rwanda started under the League of Nations mandate when the modern-day countries of Rwanda and Burundi were governed as Ruanda-Urundi.

As the colonial power, Rwanda's relationship with Belgium has been significant throughout the country's history, even after independence.

== Historical relations ==
=== Initial contact ===
Ruanda and Burundi were independent kingdoms in the Great Lakes region before the Scramble for Africa. In 1894, they were annexed by the German Empire and eventually became two districts of German East Africa.

As part of the Allied East African Campaign, Ruanda and Burundi were invaded by a Belgian force in 1916. The German forces in the region were small and hugely outnumbered. Ruanda was occupied from April–May and Burundi in June 1916.

=== Belgian rule ===
The Treaty of Versailles after World War I divided the German colonial empire among the Allied nations. German East Africa was partitioned, and Belgium was allocated to Ruanda-Urundi, even though this represented only a fraction of the territories already occupied by Belgian forces in East Africa.

Later, the League of Nations officially awarded Ruanda-Urundi to Belgium as a B-Class Mandate on 20 July 1922. The mandatory regime was also controversial in Belgium and was not approved by Belgium's parliament until 1924.

Unlike colonies which belonged to its colonial powers, a mandate was theoretically subject to international oversight through the League's Permanent Mandates Commission (PMC) in Geneva, Switzerland.

After a period of inertia, the Belgian administration became actively involved in Ruanda-Urundi between 1926 and 1931 under the governorship of Charles Voisin. The Belgians extended and consolidated a power structure based on indigenous institutions.

In practice, they developed a Tutsi ruling class to formally control a mostly Hutu population through the system of chiefs and sub-chiefs under the overall rule of the two Mwami. Contemporary racial science and eugenics led Belgian administrators to believe that the Tutsi were genetically more closely related to Europeans than the Hutu superior and deserved power.

Some scholars circulated, including John Hanning Speke, propagated the Hamitic hypothesis which held that the Tutsi were descended from "black Caucasians" who invaded Europe and were the ancestors of all the more "civilised" African peoples.

The League of Nations was formally dissolved in April 1946 following its failure to prevent World War II.

For practical purposes, it was succeeded by the new United Nations (UN). In December 1946, the new body voted to end the mandate over Ruanda-Urundi and replace it with the new "Trust Territory" status.

== Post-independence relations ==
Following anti-colonial independence movements throughout Africa and unrest in Rwanda including the overthrow of the monarchy during the Rwandan Revolution, Ruanda-Urundi became independent after a rushed transition on 1 July 1962. It was broken up on traditional lines, becoming the Republic of Rwanda and the Kingdom of Burundi.

=== Rwandan genocide ===
The Arusha Accords of 1993, the peace treaty which initially ended the Rwandan Civil War, led to the United Nations approving the mandate of UNAMIR as a peacekeeping force. Belgium and Bangladesh were the first nations to contribute troops.

The Belgian contingent was made up of around 440 troops.

After the assassination of Juvénal Habyarimana on 6 April 1994, rumours that Belgian troops were responsible spread on Hutu Power propaganda radio, including the Radio Television Libre de Milles Collines.

En route to protecting then-Prime Minister Agathe Uwilingiyama, fifteen Belgian UNAMIR peacekeepers were taken prisoner by the Rwandan Army. Ten of them, from a Paracommando Brigade, were killed - hacked to death with machetes and dismembered.

This was a strategic move by the Hutu Power extremists.

As Human Rights Watch's Allison Des Forges points out, these murders were "the first step in the plan revealed in the January 11 cable for getting rid of an effective UNAMIR force".

On 12 April, the Belgian government announced that it was withdrawing its troops and began lobbying for a complete withdrawal of UNAMIR.

== Relations after the Rwandan genocide ==
Belgium re-established diplomatic relations with Rwanda after the Genocide. It is one of Rwanda's largest bilateral aid donors, donating $41.84 million in 2019.

On March 17, 2025, Rwanda severed diplomatic ties with Belgium, accusing it of siding in the regional conflict in eastern Democratic Republic of Congo (DRC). The Rwandan Foreign Ministry criticized Belgium's "neocolonial delusions" and its "destructive historical role" in fueling ethnic extremism leading to the 1994 genocide against the Tutsi. Consequently, all Belgian diplomats were given 48 hours to leave Rwanda. In response, Belgium declared Rwandan diplomats persona non grata, escalating tensions between the two nations.

== Resident diplomatic missions ==
- Belgium has an embassy in Kigali.
- Rwanda has an embassy in Brussels.

== Education ==
École Belge de Kigali is a Belgian international school in Kigali.
