= Nyandungu Urban Wetland Eco-Tourism Park =

National park in Rwanda

Nyandungu Eco Tourism Park in Kigali

Nyandungu Urban Wetland Ecotourism park is a 120-hectare Rwandan tourism park located between Gasabo and Kicukiro Districts which allows sustainable travel of people to enjoy natural areas and wild animals in Nyandungu Valley. The park included ornamental ponds, eastern gallery forests, medicinal plant gardens, paved walk ways, restaurants, information centers and other recreational services with the intention of conserving the environment, educating visitors and improving the well-being of the local community. It was implemented by Rwanda Environment Management Authority (REMA) in 2020.

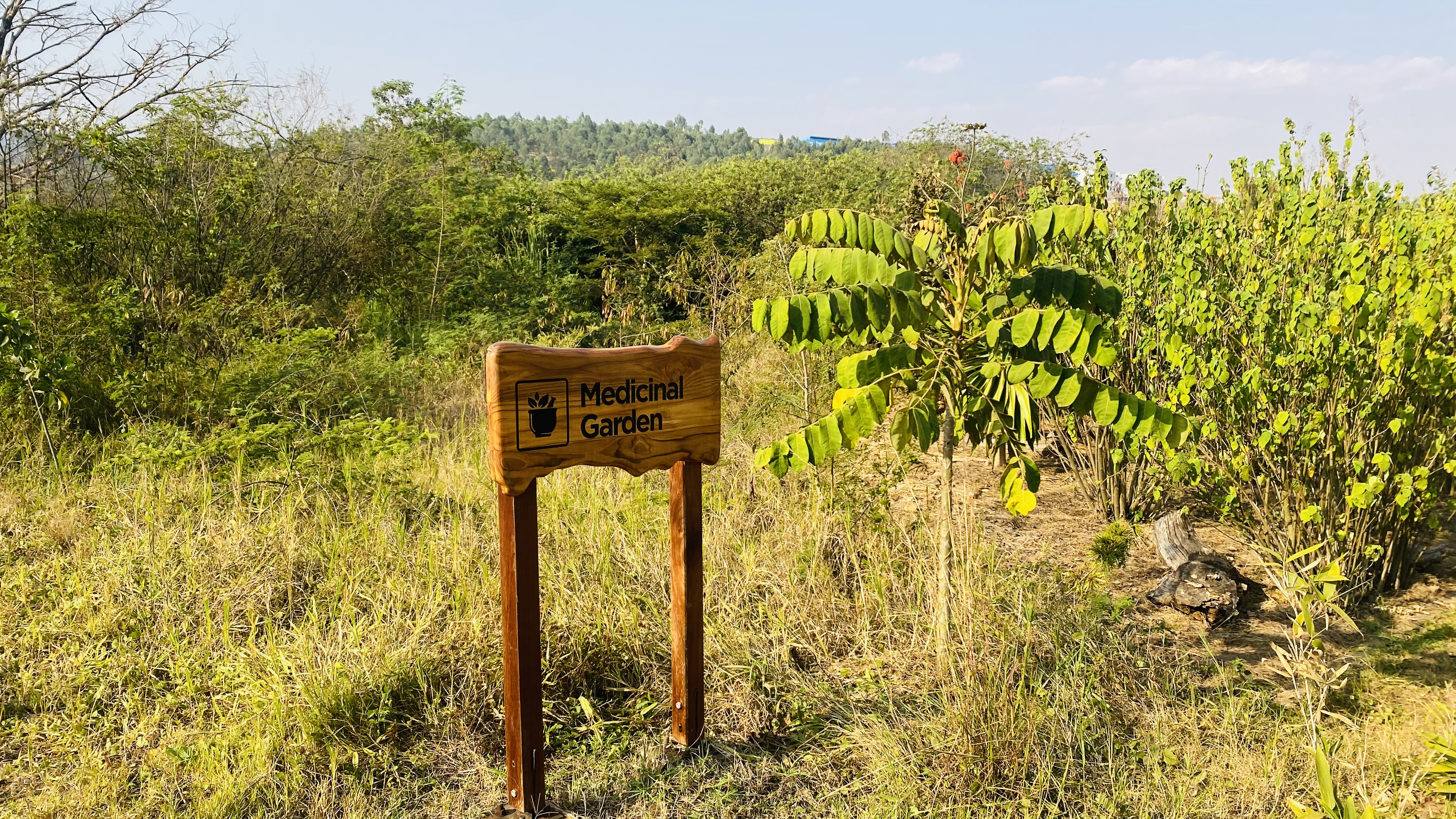
Nyandungu Urban Wetland Eco-Tourism Park medicinal garden

== History ==
The plan to create Nyandungu Urban Wetland Ecotourism park began in 2016 with a budget of 5 million dollars. In the beginning, REMA counted around 70 species of birds in the park.

== Tourism services ==
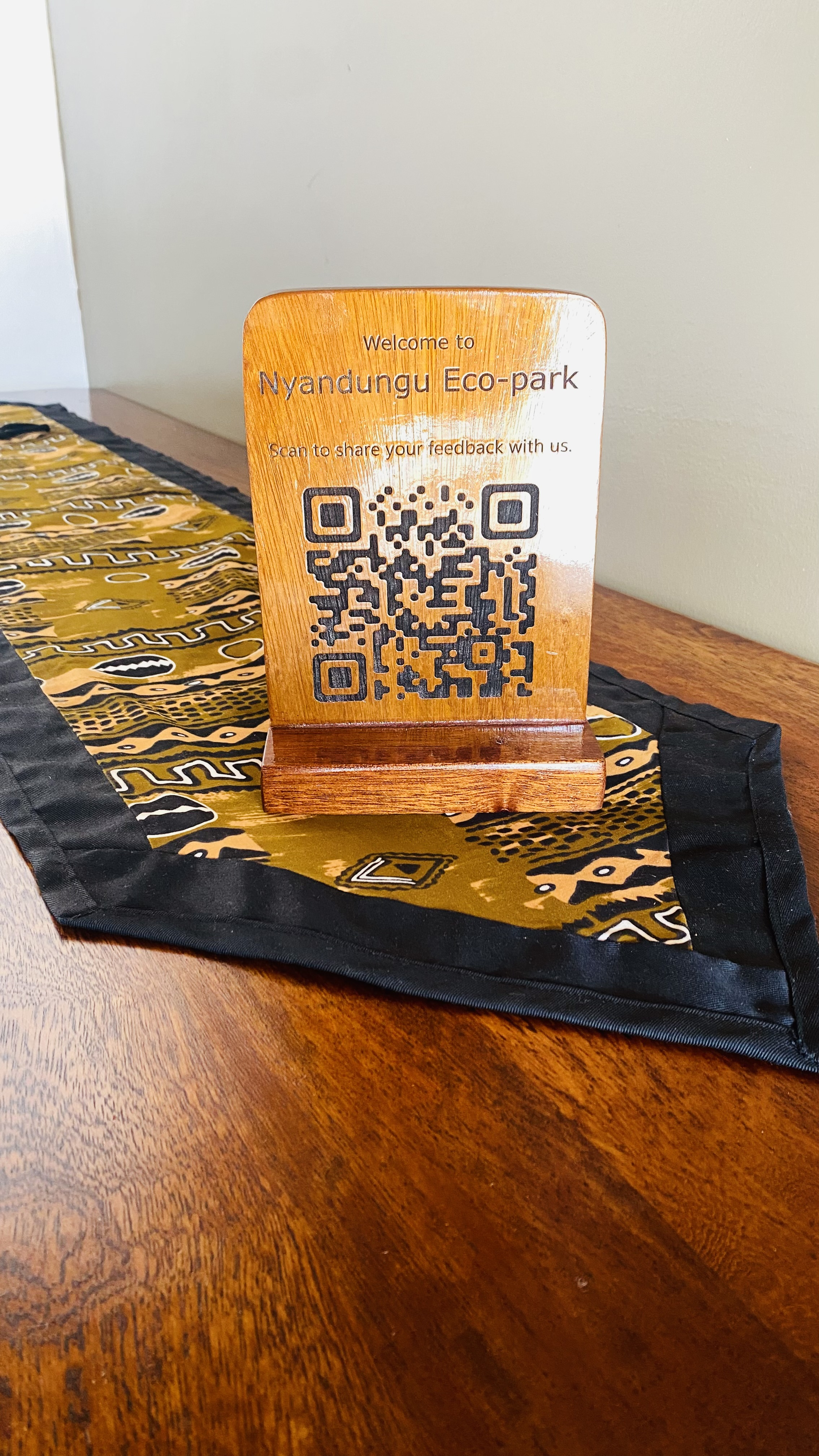
Nyandungu Urban Wetland Eco-Tourism Park QR code

The park was pen official from 8 July 2022 and will welcome visitors seven days a week from 6am-6pm.

There is restaurant service.

They facilitate people in guiding and cycling in the park.
