= Kacyiru =

Coordinates: 01°56′16.8″S 30°04′48″E

- Sector
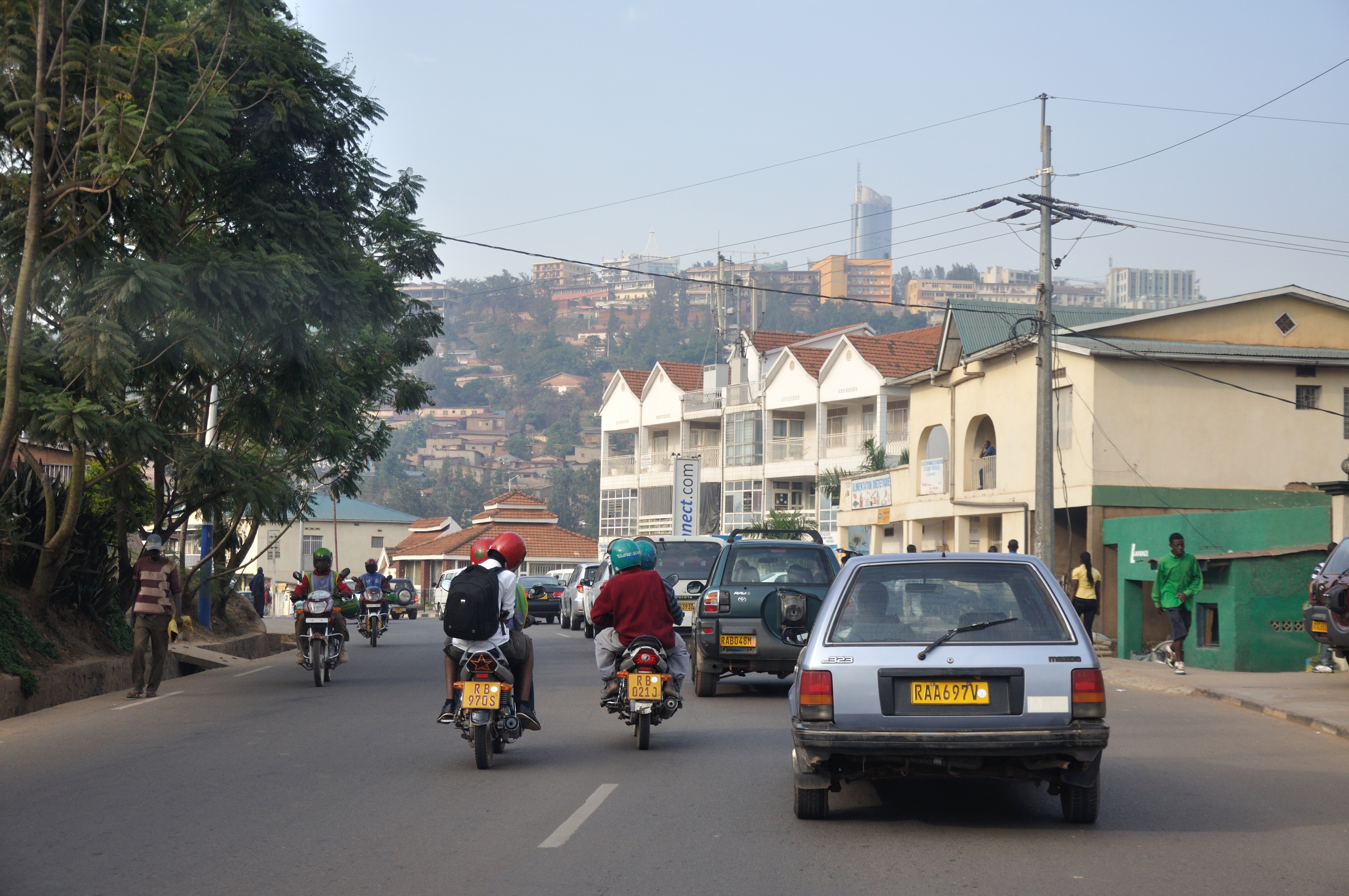
- Street in Kacyiru

- Location in Rwanda
- Country: Rwanda
- Province: Kigali
- District: Gasabo District

Area
  - Total: 5.8 km^{2} (2.2 sq mi)
- Elevation: 1,470 m (4,820 ft)

Population (2022 census)
  - Total: 30,036
  - Density: 5,200/km^{2} (13,000/sq mi)

Kacyiru is one of 15 sectors in the district of Gasabo in the capital province of Kigali in Rwanda.

== Geography ==
Kacyiru covers an area of 5.8 km² and lies at an altitude of about 1,470 meters. The sector is divided into three cells: Kamatamu, Kamutwa and Kibaza. Kacyiru is bordered by Kinyinya to the north, Remera to the east, Kimihurura to the south, Muhima to the southwest and Gisozi to the northwest.

== Demographics ==
According to the census of 2022, the population was 30,036. Ten years earlier it had been 37,088, which corresponds to an annual population decrease of 2.1 percent between 2012 and 2022.

== Culture and facilities ==
Kacyiru is renowned for a presence of multiple important structures. To the east of the sector is the Inema Arts Center and King Faisal Hospital. To the west are the headquarters of the Rwanda National Police. The headquarters of the Ministry of Education is also located in the sector.

== Diplomatic missions ==
Kacyiru having served as an administrative hotspot in Rwandan history makes it the location of multiple diplomatic missions, Including:

- U.S Embassy in Rwanda
- Sweden Abroad
- South African Embassy
- Embassy of Luxembourg
- Romanian Mission

== Transport ==
The National Road 3 runs through the center of the sector in an east-west direction.
