= André Rwamakuba =

André Rwamakuba (b. 1950) was the Minister of Primary and Secondary Education in the interim government during the Rwandan genocide in 1994. He was born in Nduba, Gikomero commune in Kigali City and is a medical doctor who has studied at Butare University, and in Zaire and Belgium. He was arrested on 21 October 1998 in Namibia and indicted for complicity in genocide and crimes against humanity including extermination and murder. He was acquitted of all charges on 20 September 2006 by the ICTR.

== Early life and career ==
Rwamakuba was born in 1950 in the Gikomero commune, Kigali, Rwanda. He studied to become a doctor at the Butare University in Rwanda and also in Zaire (now Democratic Republic of Congo) and Belgium. Rwamakuba was a member of the Mouvement démocratique républicain (MDR) party. He worked as a public health specialist and was appointed Director of the Kigali Health Region in 1992. After Rwandan President Juvénal Habyarimana was assassinated in 1994, Rwamakuba became the interim government's Minister of Primary and Secondary Education.

== Arrest and acquittal ==
He was arrested on 21 October 1998 in Namibia and indicted for complicity in genocide and crimes against humanity including extermination and murder. He was acquitted of all charges on 20 September 2006 by the ICTR. The Prosecution did not appeal the acquittal.

== Compensation ==
Several months later, on 31 January 2007, the International Criminal Tribunal for Rwanda (ICTR) found that Rwamakuba's right to legal assistance under Article 20(4)(d) of the ICTR Statute had been breached in the first months of detention. The ICTR ordered that Rwamakuba be compensated in the amount of $2000.
