= Inema Arts Center =

Art center in Kigali, Rwanda

Coordinates: 1.94346°S 30.09080°E

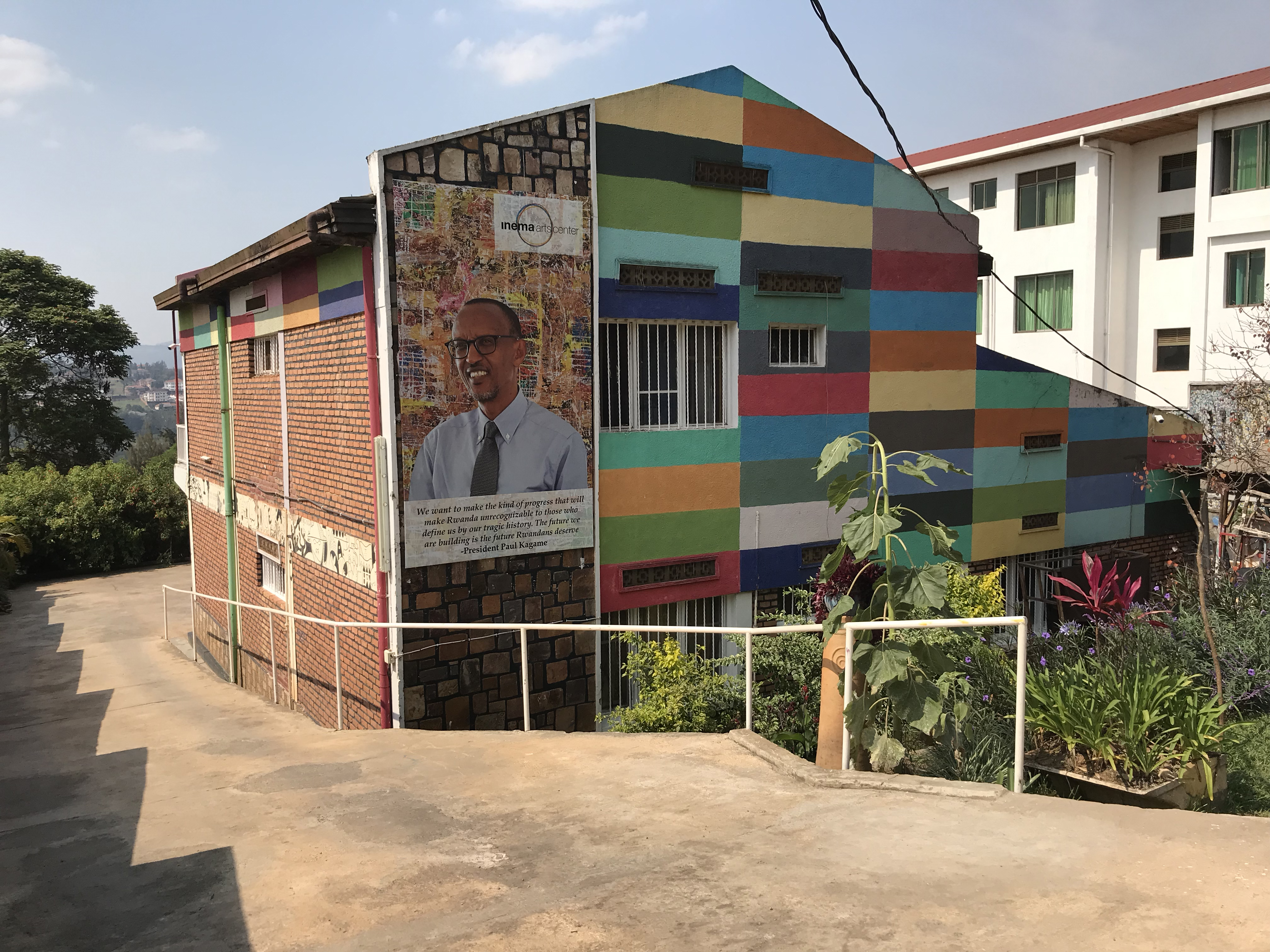
Inema Arts Center in 2019

Inema Arts Center is an arts center and art gallery located in Kigali, the capital city of Rwanda.

The center was founded in 2012 by brothers and painters: Innocent Nkurunziza, Emmanuel Nkuranga, Kenneth Nkusi, Denis Mpabuka, Timothy Akimanzi, and Joseph Ntwali. The six painters and siblings started Inema Arts Center with the goal of showcasing Rwanda's latent artistic skills, using creative expression to bring the community and country to life, and providing a platform for Rwandan artists.

== Inema Art Gallery ==
Inema Arts Center has evolved into a platform for various artists who communicate through creative expression. Several Rwandan creative artists make up the Inema Arts Center. Inema Arts Center currently has slots for ten resident artists to realize their creative potential. The specialities at Inema are music, dance, African contemporary arts, and crafts.

The Inema Art Gallery features portraits, sculptures, and other artistic objects created and shown by Inema artists. The center also conducts a variety of projects and activities aimed at promoting Rwanda's creative arts and offering a forum for creative expression through workshops, training, and practical instruction.
