= Kimihurura =

Coordinates: 01°56′16.8″S 30°04′48″E

- Sector
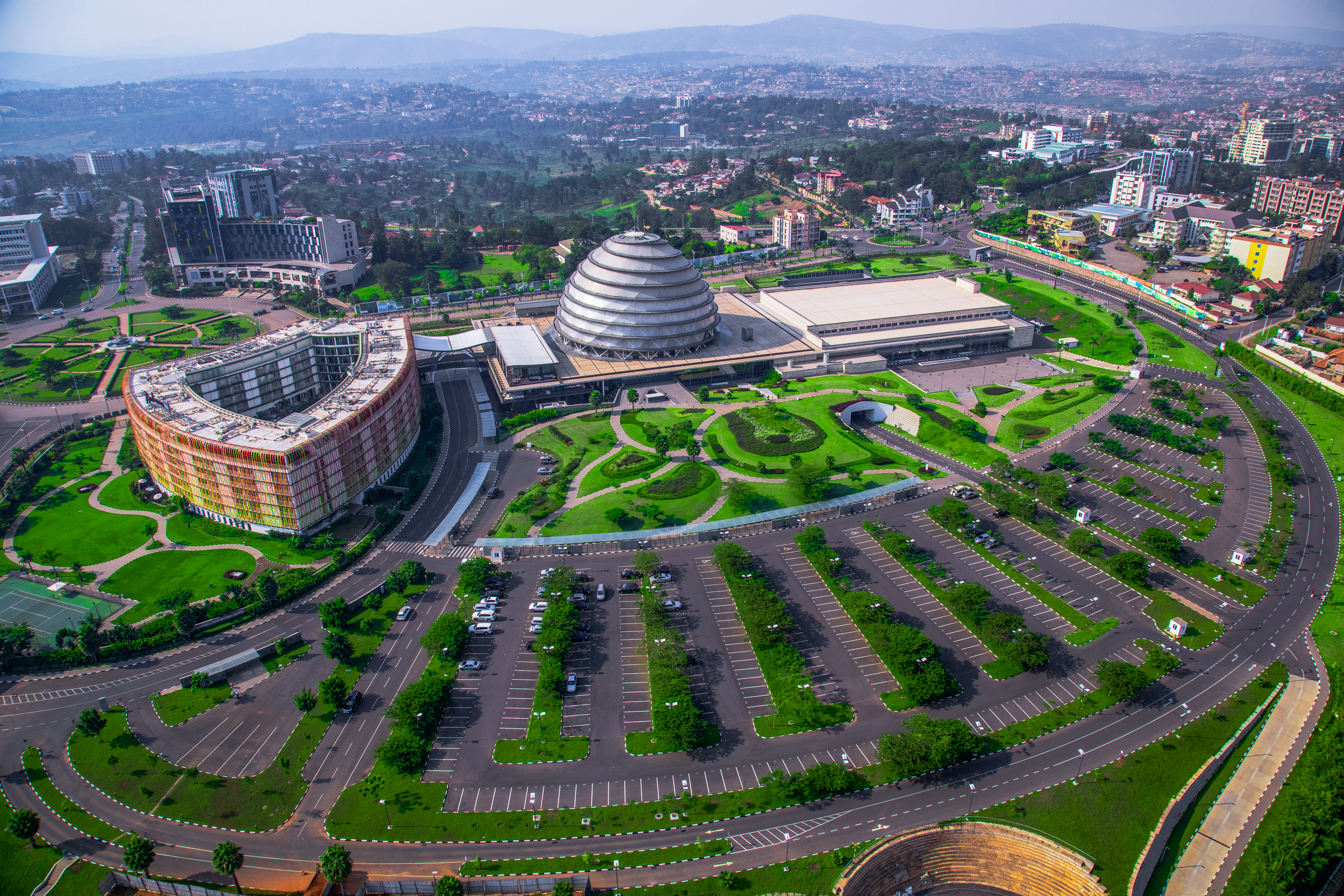
- Kigali Convention Center

- Location in Rwanda
- Country: Rwanda
- Province: Kigali
- District: Gasabo District

Area
  - Total: 5.1 km^{2} (2.0 sq mi)
- Elevation: 1,480 m (4,860 ft)

Population (2022 census)
  - Total: 16,425
  - Density: 3,200/km^{2} (8,300/sq mi)

Kimihurura is one of 15 sectors in the district of Gasabo in Rwanda's capital of Kigali.

== Geography ==
Kimihurura covers an area of 5.1 km^{2} and lies at an altitude of about 1,480 meters. The sector is divided into three cells: Kamukina, Kimihurura and Rugando. Neighboring sectors are Kacyiro in the north, Remera in the east, Kicukiro in the southeast, Gikondo in the southwest and Muhima in the west.

== Demographics ==
According to the 2022 census, the population was 16,425. Ten years earlier, it was 21,672, which corresponds to an annual population decrease of 2.7 percent between 2012 and 2022.

== Places of interest ==
Within the sector, the Kigali Convention Centre is located in Rugando. Construction of the convention center, which opened in July 2016, began in 2009 and cost around $300 million. The Anti-Corruption Monument, a 12-meter-high sculpture in the shape of a human hand by Iraqi artist Ahmed Al-Bahrani, has stood in the parking lot in front of the convention center since December 2019. West of the congress grounds are shopping centers and Kigali Centenary Park, and a few hundred meters northeast in Kamukina are the Chamber of Deputies of Rwanda and the Campaign Against Genocide Museum.

The sector is also home to several ministries of Rwanda, including the Ministry of Defence, the Ministry of Foreign Affairs and International Cooperation, the Ministry of Infrastructure and the Ministry of Justice.
