= Gisozi =

Coordinates: 01°55′4.08″S 30°03′40.68″E

- Sector
- Location in Rwanda
- Country: Rwanda
- Province: Kigali
- District: Gasabo District

Area
  - Total: 9.1 km^{2} (3.5 sq mi)
- Elevation: 1,510 m (4,950 ft)

Population (2022 census)
  - Total: 75,611
  - Density: 8,300/km^{2} (22,000/sq mi)

Gisozi is one of 15 sectors in the district of Gasabo in the province of Kigali in Rwanda.

== Geography ==
Gisozi covers an area of 9.1 km^{2} and lies at an altitude of about 1,510 meters. The sector is divided into two cells: Musezero in the northeast and Ruhango in the southwest. Gisozi's neighboring sectors are Jabana to the north, Kinyinya to the east, Kacyiro to the southeast, Muhima to the south and Gatsata to the west. In the west, the sector also borders the Nyabugogo River.

== Demographics ==
According to the Rwandan census of 2022, the population was 75,611. Ten years earlier, it was 44,003, which corresponds to an annual population increase of 5.6 percent between 2012 and 2022.

== Culture ==
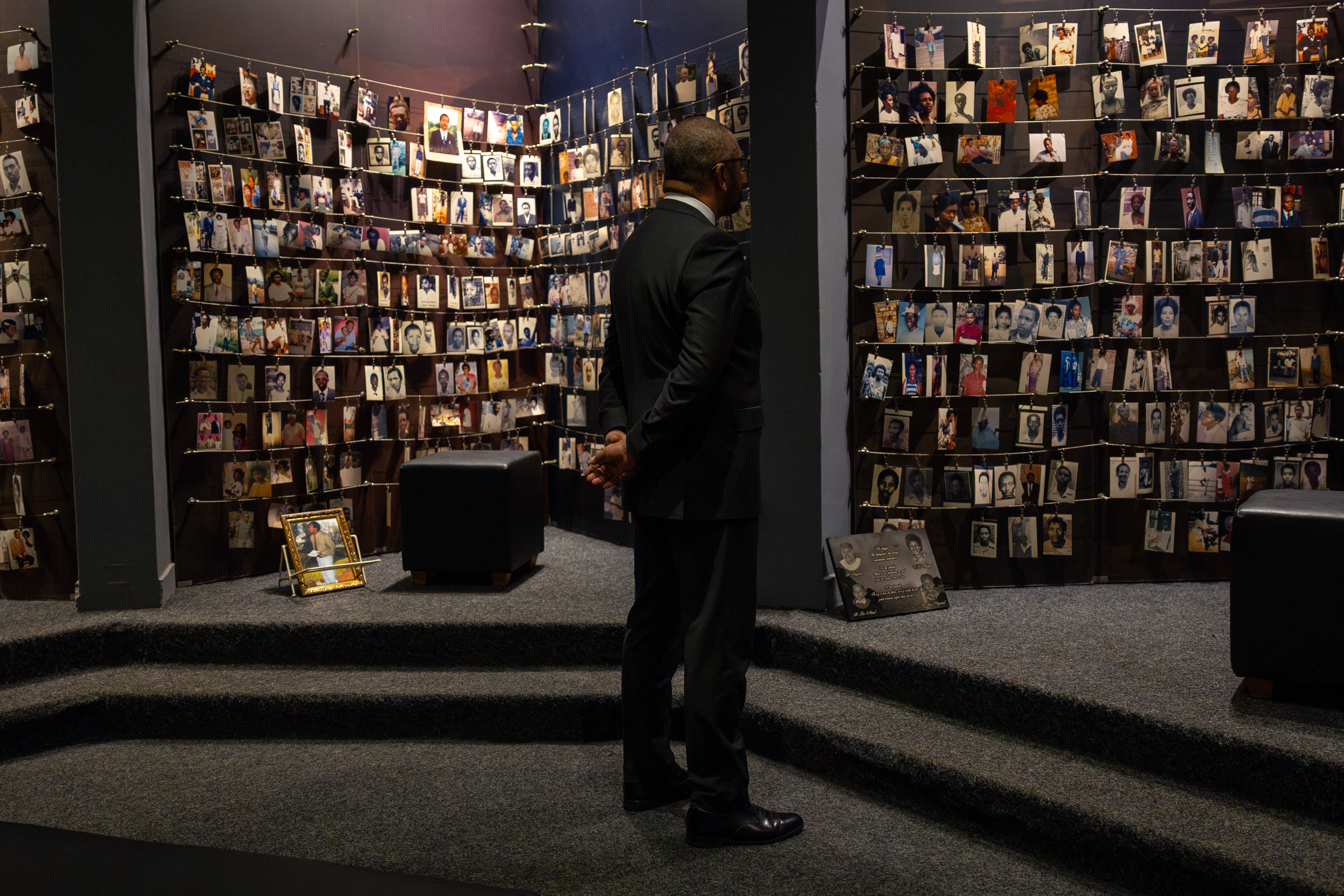
Kigali Genocide Memorial

The sector is home to the Kigali Genocide Memorial, where over 250,000 victims of the genocide in Rwanda were buried. In 2023, the Kigali Genocide Memorial, along with three other memorials, was included in the UNESCO World Heritage.

== Education ==
The Université Libre de Kigali (ULK) and the École Belge de Kigali international school are located in Gisozi.
