= Kigali Convention Centre =

Convention center in Kigali, Rwanda

- Interactive map of Kigali Convention Centre
- Address: Kigali Roundabout, Kimihurura
- Location: Kigali, Rwanda
- Coordinates: 01°57′17″S 30°05′38″E
- Owner: Ultimate Concept Limited
- Operator: Radisson Blu

Construction
- Built: 2009–2016
- Cost: $300 million

Website
- http://www.kcc.rw

The Kigali Convention Centre is a convention Centre in Kigali, the capital and largest city in Rwanda.

== Location ==
The convention centre is located on Highway KN5, adjacent to the KG2 Roundabout, about 6 kilometres (4 mi) west of Kigali International Airport. This is about 7 kilometres (4 mi) east of the neighborhood of Kigali called Nyabugogo.

== Overview ==
Interior of the centre

In 2007, three Rwandan corporate investors pooled resources to build the real estate complex. They formed a company called Ultimate Concept Limited, to develop and own the centre. The centre has four major components:

- A 5-star hotel, Radisson Blu Hotel Kigali, with 292 rooms on six floors
- Conference center with seating capacity of 2,600
- Kigali Information Technology Park, with 32,200 square metres (346,598 sq ft) of rentable office and retail space
- A museum on the bottom floor of the IT office park

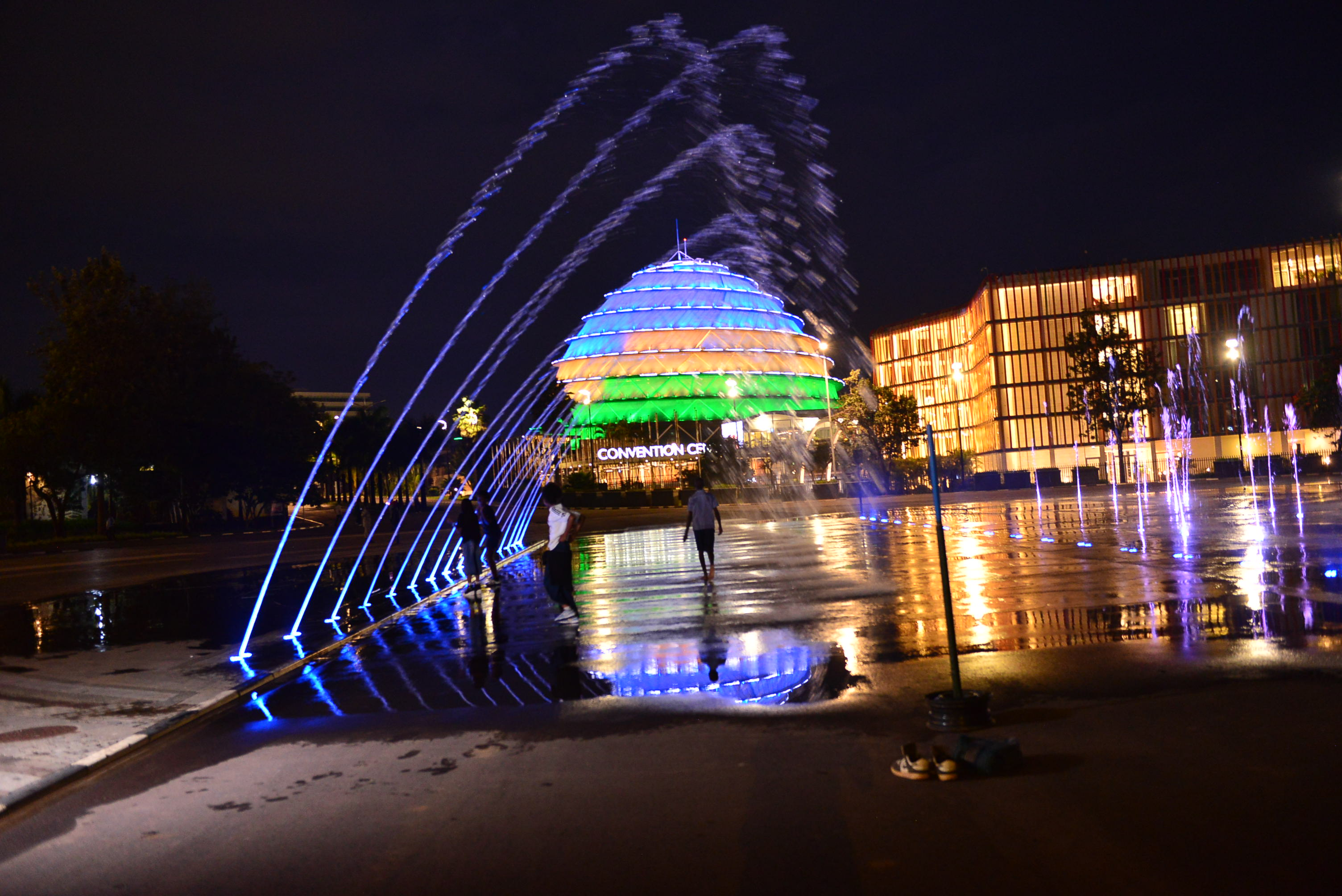
Kigali Convention Center

Construction began in 2009 according to the design by German architect Roland Dieterle and was completed in 2016.

== Events ==
- 2022 Commonwealth Heads of Government Meeting
- African Union Summit on July 8, 2016
- World Economic Forum for Africa 2016
- Transform Africa Summit in October 2013, October 2015 and May 2017
- International Conference on Learning Representations, 2023

== Ownership ==
Ultimate Concept Limited, the owner-developer of the convention centre, is a Rwandan company whose ownership is as depicted in the table below:

Ultimate Concept Limited stock ownership
| Rank | Name of owner | Percentage ownership |
|---|---|---|
| 1 | Prime Holdings Limited | 50.0 |
| 2 | Social Security Fund of Rwanda | 25.0 |
| 3 | Rwanda Investment Group | 25.0 |

== Gallery ==
Kigali Convention Center

Kigali Convention Centre changes light in the night.

Main entrance
