= Gasabo District =

- District
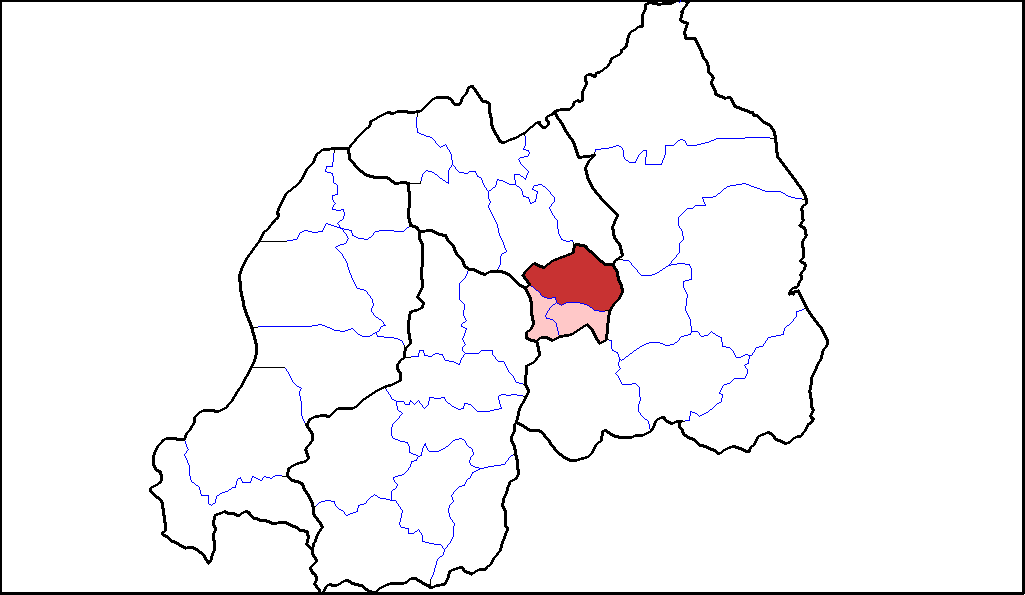
- Shown within City of Kigali and Rwanda
- Coordinates: 1°53′S 30°08′E
- Country: Rwanda
- City: Kigali
- Capital: Remera
- Sectors: List: Bumbogo; Gatsata; Gikomero; Gisozi; Jabana; Jali; Kacyiru kanserege; Kimihurura; Kimironko; Kinyinya; Ndera; Nduba; Remera; Rusororo; Rutunga

Government
  - Executive Administrator: Bernard Bayasese

Area
  - District: 430.30 km^{2} (166.14 sq mi)

Population (2022)
  - District: 879,505
  - Rank: 1st of 30 districts
  - Density: 2,043.9/km^{2} (5,293.8/sq mi)
  - Urban: 712,399 (81%)
  - Rural: 167,106 (19%)
  - Male: 443,987 (50.48%)
  - Female: 435,518 (49.52%)
- Website: https://www.gasabo.gov.rw/

Gasabo is a district (akarere) of Kigali, the capital of Rwanda. The headquarters of Gasabo are located in the Remera Sector. The district includes neighborhoods such as: Kacyiru, Kimironko, Remera, Nyarutarama and Kimihurura.

The district is the location of the Gisozi Genocide Memorial Site, the burial place of approximately 300,000 victims of the 1994 Genocide against Tutsis. In addition to the cemetery, the memorial has a related genocide exhibition area and library. There are plans to develop a teaching centre on the history of the genocide.

== History ==
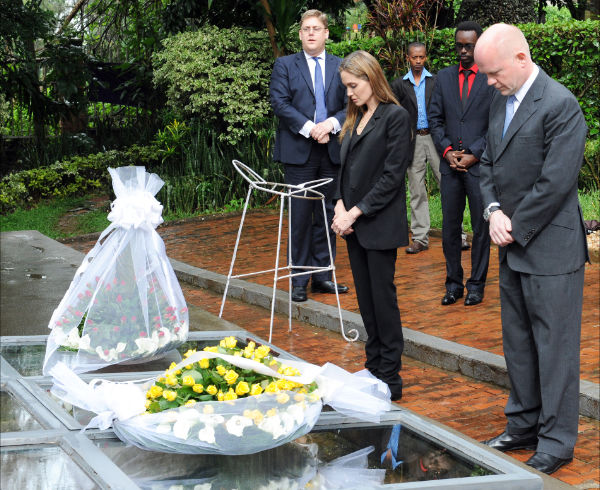
Foreign Secretary William Hague and UNHCR Special Envoy Angelina Jolie visit the genocide memorial in Kigali, March 2013.

The original country of Rwanda, referred to as "the Rwanda of Gasabo" (u Rwanda rwa Gasabo), was a small territorial entity located in the present-day Gasabo District, along the valley of Lake Muhazi, particularly around Nyabugogo. During the era of historical kings (abami b’ibitekerezo), Rwanda came under the reign of King Ruganzu Bwimba- The first in line of monarchs who ruled from the fourteenth to the twentieth centuries. The kingdom of Rwanda was governed by kings (abami)

During President Habyarimana's government, Gasabo District was known as Gikomero commune. It was divided into ten sectors: Bumbogo, Gasabo, Gicaca, Gikomero, Gishaka, Kayanga, Nduba, Rutunga, Sha and Shango.

== Geography ==
The district occupies the northern half of the City of Kigali, which had its boundaries extended under local government reorganisation in 2006. Gasabo includes major suburbs of Kigali, sections of a ring of hills which surround the city, and some villages to the north and east of those. Rwanda's wealthiest area, Nyarutarama is also in the district, as are the office of the president (in Kacyiru) and most of the ministries.

The district contains the following sectors: Bumbogo, Gatsata, Gikomero, Gisozi, Jabana, Jali, Kacyiru, Kimihurura, Kimironko, Kinyinya, Ndera, Nduba, Remera, Rusororo, Rutunga.

== Population ==
Historical Population of the Gasabo District
Year	Population Gasabo	Census of Population and Housing
2002	320,516	2002 Rwandan Census
2012	▲529,561	2012 Rwandan Census
2022	▲879,505	2022 Rwandan Census

Basing to the results of the fourth population and housing census (2012) it indicated that Gasabo district has a population of 529,561 representing 46.8% among them male represent 51.7% and female 48.3% of the total population for Kigali City (1,132,686 population) and 5% of the total national population (10,515,973). This population is distributed into urban and rural area represented by 69% and 31% respectively. The average age of population is 25.5 years. According to EICV 5 (2017), 73.7% of households headed by males and 22.1% of households headed by females in Gasabo district whereas at national level 68.6% of households headed by males and 25% of households headed by females.

Sectors of the Gasabo District by population according to the 2022 census
N°	Sectors of Gasabo District	Census (2022)
1°	Bumbogo	112,899
2°	Kinyinya	125,400
3°	Ndera	95,164
4°	Gisozi	75,611
5°	Nduba	68,424
6°	Jabana	63,862
7°	Rusororo	61,787
8°	Kimironko	61,733
9°	Gatsata	46,262
10°	Jali	41,156
11°	Remera	38,648
12°	Kacyiru	30,036
13°	Rutunga	22,468
14°	Gikomero	19,630
15°	Kimihurura	16,425
Total	Gasabo District	879,505

== Topography and climate ==
This district is characterized by the mixture of high mountains with average altitude of 1,800 metres (5,900 ft) mainly located in the rural zone, sloping basins and valleys. It has over 30 wetlands and small rivers traversing through the valleys. The main unique long river of about 50 km (31 mi) long and 1,000 metres (3,300 ft) wide is the one that originates from Lake Muhazi and traverses through marshy and boggy valleys before emptying into the Nyabugogo River and thereafter connects to the Nyabarongo River. Also, Lake Muhazi in the north and part in the east borders Gasabo district. Similarly, other water sources of importance are: Rusumo River in Rugende which ends in Akagera River, Buliza River that traverses through Karuruma, Umulindi and Rusine centers before empting into Nyabugogo River. These marshlands or wetlands provide potentialities to the district if well reclaimed can enhance or increase agriculture productivity, improve tourism, improve environmental ecological system as well.

It has two main climatic seasons in a year, which are, the dry and rain seasons. The two major climatic seasons alternate within the year, hence, the District experiencing two dry seasons and rain seasons as defined below.

== Administratives boundaries ==
Kigali Genocide Memorial Centre - Flickr - Dave Proffer (1) - cropped

Gasabo is in the North East of Kigali City and bordered by Kicukiro district (south), Nyarugenge (west south), Rwamagana (east south), Rulindo (north west) and Gicumbi (north east). The district's surface area is 429.2 km^{2} (165.7 sq mi) of which a big portion is rural (84%) while the small portion represents the developed urban area (16%).

== Education ==
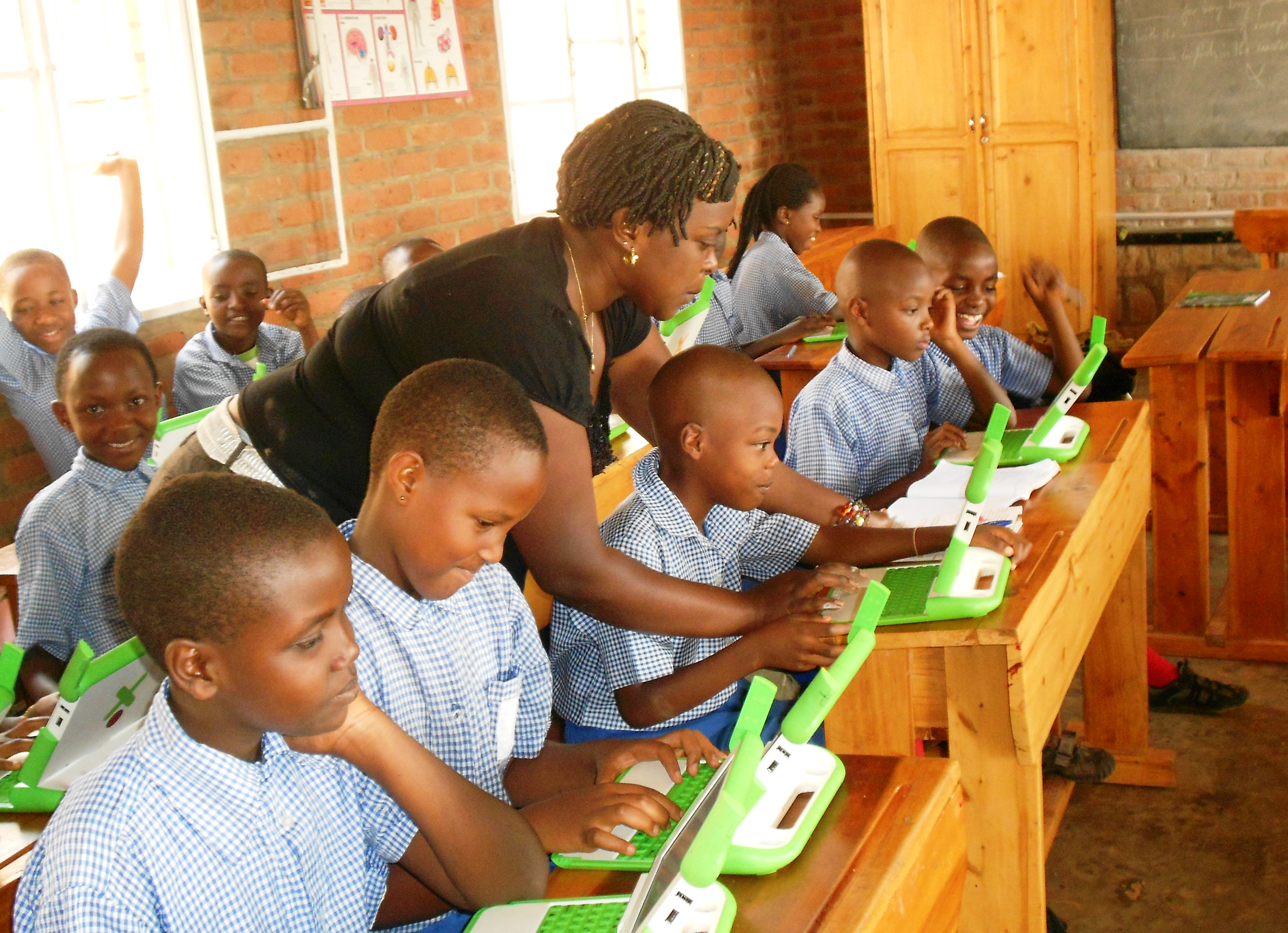
OLPC classroom teaching

Education is the primary agent of transformation towards sustainable development. It increases people's capacities to transform their visions for society into reality. All countries strive for quality education for their sustainable development. In Africa, especially in our country Rwanda, education is considered as a fundamental human right and an essential means to ensure that all Rwandans realize their full potentials. It places special emphasis on basic education as a priority area within the Poverty Reduction Strategy Papers (PRSP) because of the strong correlation between education and improved economic opportunities, better life and fewer children (family planning), especially for girls. [Ministry of Finance and Economic Planning (MINECOFIN), 2005:40].

However, in Gasabo district- the indicators such as gross primary enrolment rate (139.9%) and gross secondary enrolment rate (66.1%) positions the district below the national rates of 148.4% (gross primary enrollment) and above the 40.9% national rate in gross secondary school enrolment. Also in terms of literacy levels- the district's literacy levels persons of 15 years and older in the district is above the national average rate of 69.7% at 84.8%, though, slightly below rates registered in Kicukiro and Nyarugenge at 89.5% and 86.7%. Though, the district level is below the country's target of 90% and 100%as stipulated in the 7YGP and Vision 2020 respectively. The same survey revealed that the computer literacy rate for persons of 15+ years stands at 17.4%. The district recognizes the need to improve the literacy rates to boost up ICT innovations and private sector led economy. According to the administrative data, the girl/boy attendance at primary level is equally balanced at 50% unlike the imbalance observed at high level

In terms of student/classroom ratio in primary level is at 35.9 below the standard of 46 pupils per classroom while pupil/qualified teacher ratio is 54. It is also observed that the district has unqualified, for example, in private, private aided and public primary schools are 5%, 4% and 8% respectively. Usage of computers and internet in primary schools is 4,641 computers and 28 schools have access to internet.

== Infrastructures located at Gasabo District ==
Gasabo District is set to upgrade and renovate the district infrastructure in line with the Kigali City Master Plan such as schools, Roads, King Faysal Hospital, Housing, Churches, Touristic zones, Memorial centers, Markets, Amahoro Stadium, Kigali Arena, Kigali Convention Center, different Ministries,...

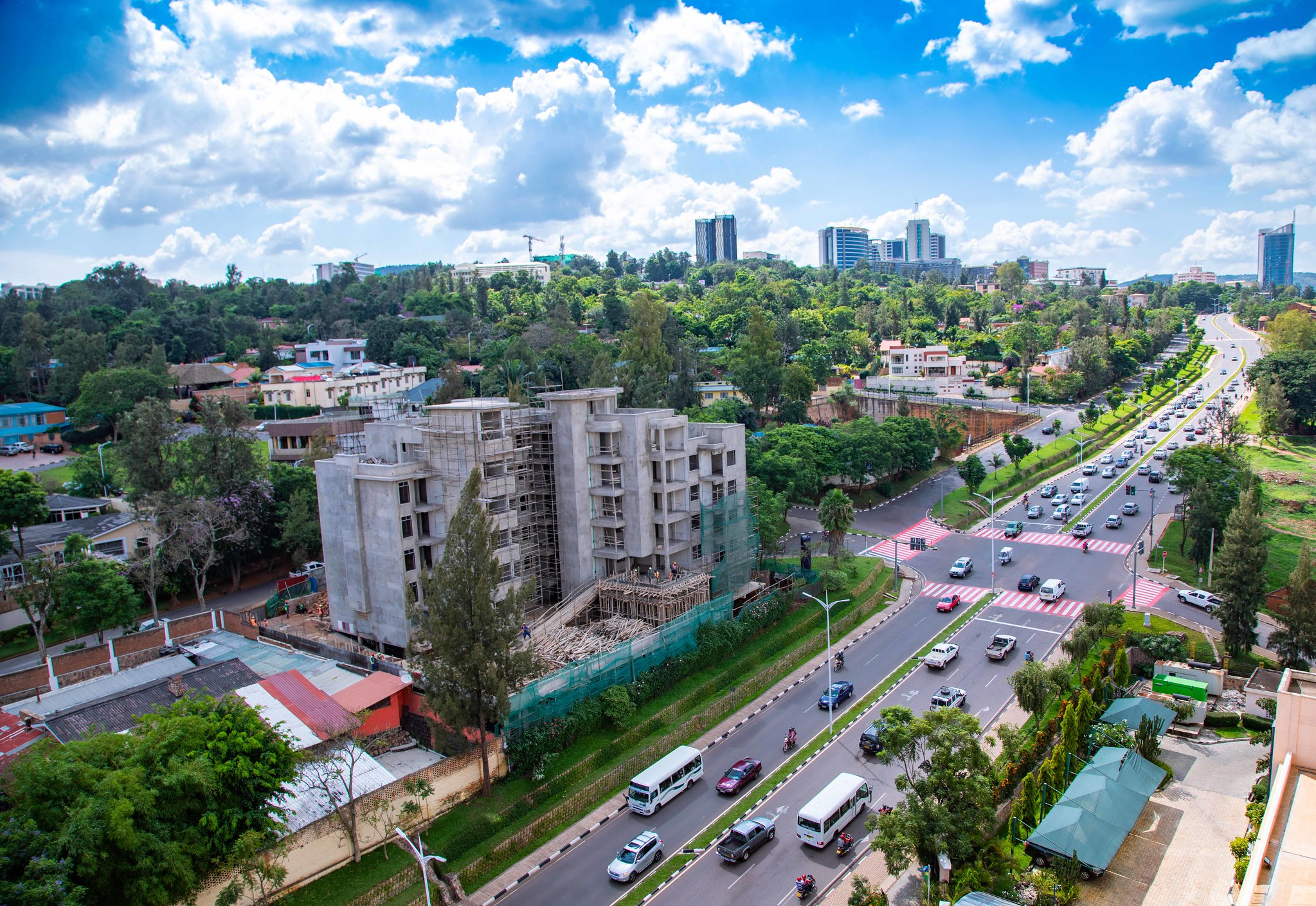
Road in Kigali

=== Roads ===
This follows the signing of a memorandum of understanding between the district and Horizon Construction Company Ltd to facilitate the upgrading, construction and renovation of roads in the district

== Amahoro National Stadium ==
Amahoro Stadium is the biggest one in Rwanda and oldest. The ministry of sports have recently refurbished it and now have the capacity of hosting 45,508 people seated. And Kigali ARENA the stadium that can host basketball, volleyball and shows have the capacity of 10,000 people seated.

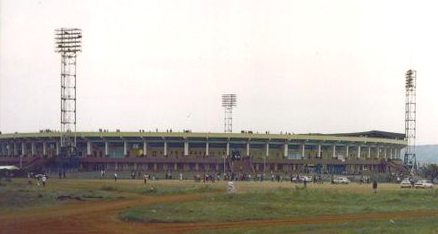
Amahoro Stadium 2003

== Notable persons ==
- André Rwamakuba, accused war criminal
- Daniel Izere, songwriter
- Eugene Mussolini, member of the Chamber of Deputies and former member of the Gasabo District Council

== See also ==
- Kigali Innovation City
- Kigali Convention Center
