= Bumbogo =

- Sector
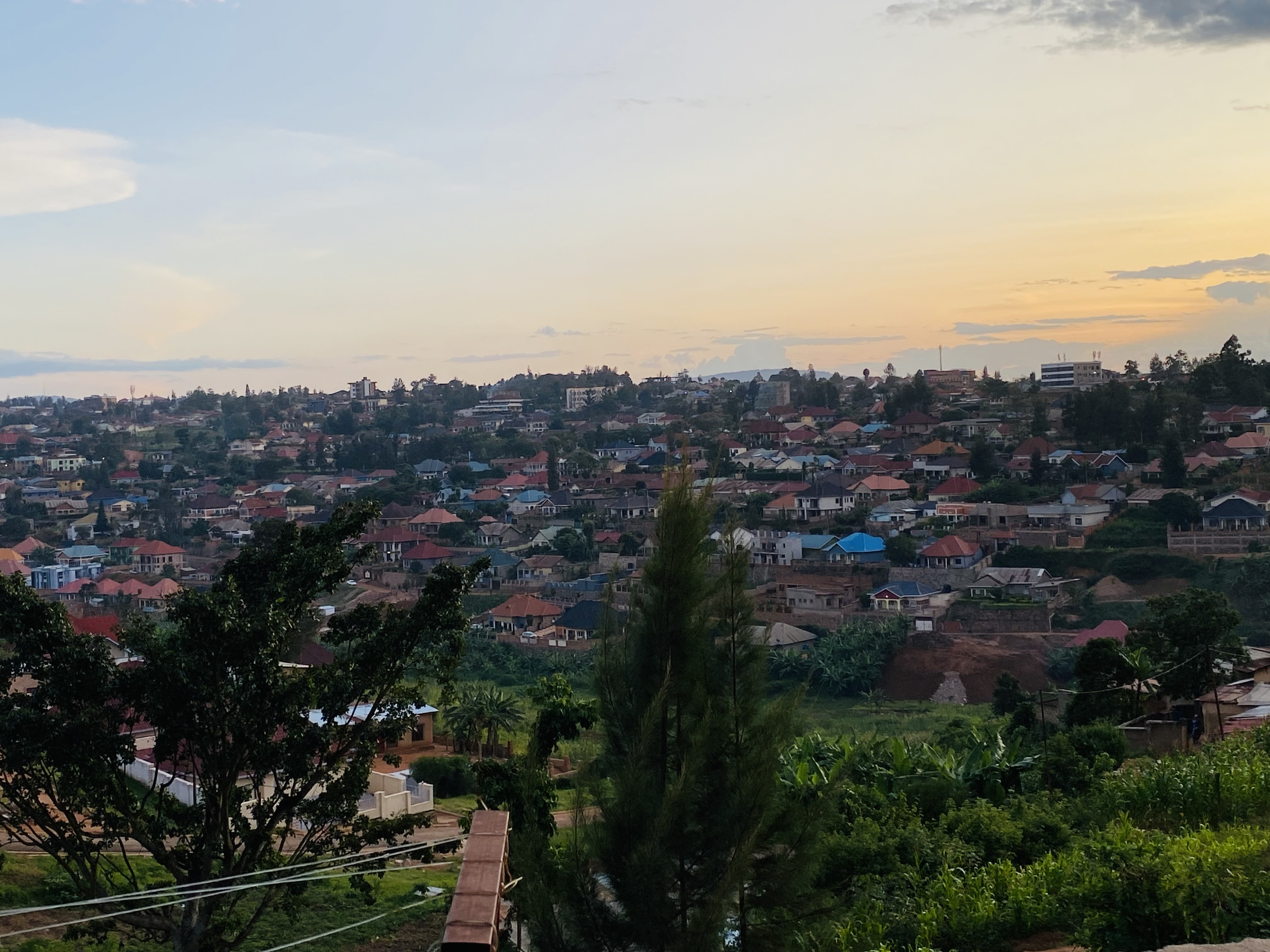
- View from Ndera sector towards Bumbogo
- Interactive map of Bumbogo
- Coordinates: 1.888°S 30.156°E
- Country: Rwanda
- Province: Kigali
- District: Gasabo District

Area
  - Total: 60.60 km^{2} (23.40 sq mi)

Population (2022 census)
  - Total: 112,899
  - Density: 1,863/km^{2} (4,825/sq mi)
- Time zone: UTC+2 (CAT)

Bumbogo (Kinyarwanda: Umurenge wa Bumbogo) is one of the 15 Umurenge (sectors) of Gasabo District in the city of Kigali, Rwanda.

== Geography ==
Bumbogo covers an area of 60.6 km². The sector is divided into seven cells: Kinyaga, Musave, Mvuzo, Ngara, Nkuzuzu, Nyabikenke and Nyagasozi. Neighbouring sectors are Rutunga to the north, Gikomero to the east, Ndera to the southeast, Kimironko to the southwest, Kinyinya to the west and Nduba to the northwest.

== Population ==
According to the 2022 census, Bumbogo had a population of 112,899. Ten years earlier, its population was 35,381, corresponding to an average annual population increase of about 12 percent between 2012 and 2022.
