= Kinyinya =

- Location in Burundi
- Coordinates: 3°39′S 30°21′E
- Country: Burundi

Kinyinya is a city in eastern Burundi, close to the border with Tanzania. It is located southwest of Gisuru and northeast of Mount Kikizi.
