= Ndera =

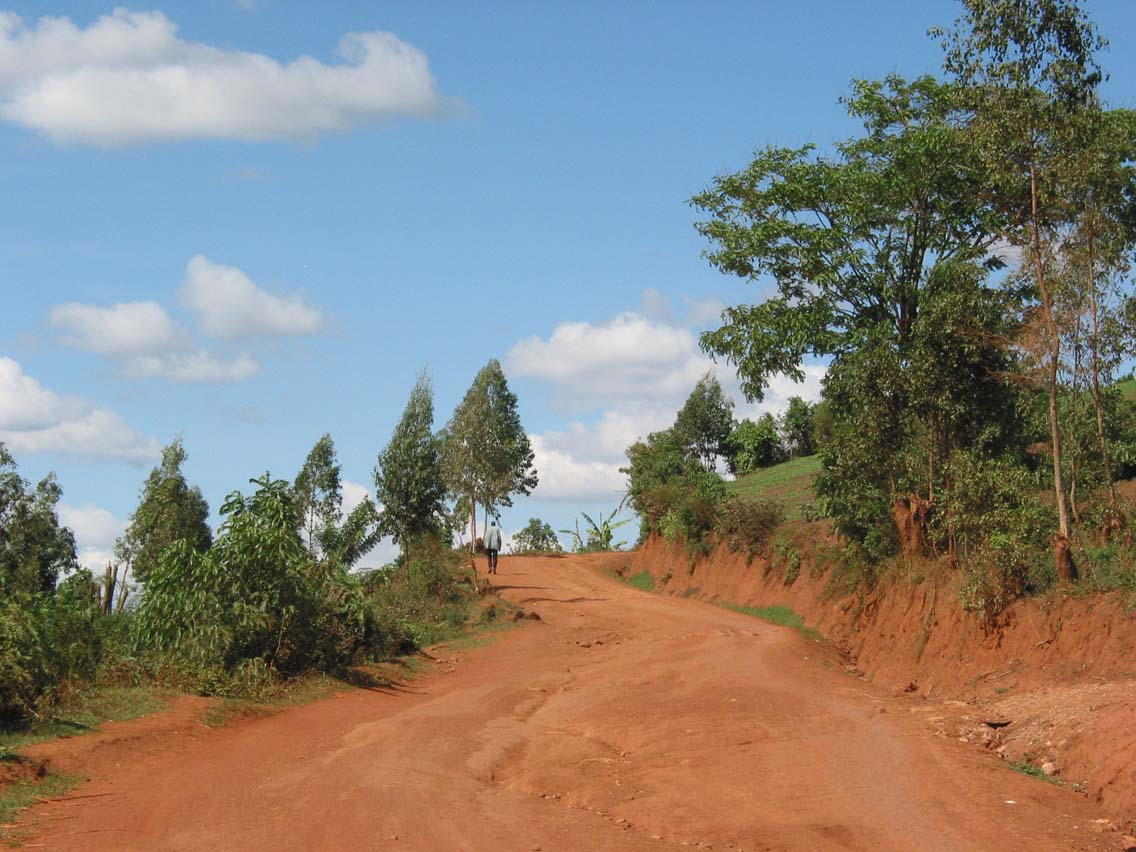
- Road leading to Ndera

- Location within Rwanda
- Coordinates: 1.9495°S 30.1697°E
- Country: Rwanda
- Province: City of Kigali
- District: Gasabo

Population
  - Total: 41,764
  - Density: 829/km^{2} (2,150/sq mi)

Ndera is one of the 15 sectors that make up the district of Gasabo found in kigali city. It is about 15 kilometres (9.3 mi) from the capital.

The sector is popular due to the location of Ndera Neuropsychiatric Teaching Hospital (Caraes Ndera) which is the referral hospital for neuropsychiatric disorders. which was established in 1968 but received its first patients in 1972

The hospital re-opened in August 1994, and began treating people who had been traumatized by the recent Rwandan genocide. As of 2008, it treated about 2,500 patients monthly.

Ndera sector is also a home to the minor seminary of St. Vincent.
