= Kicukiro District =

Coordinates: 2°00′S 30°09′E

- District
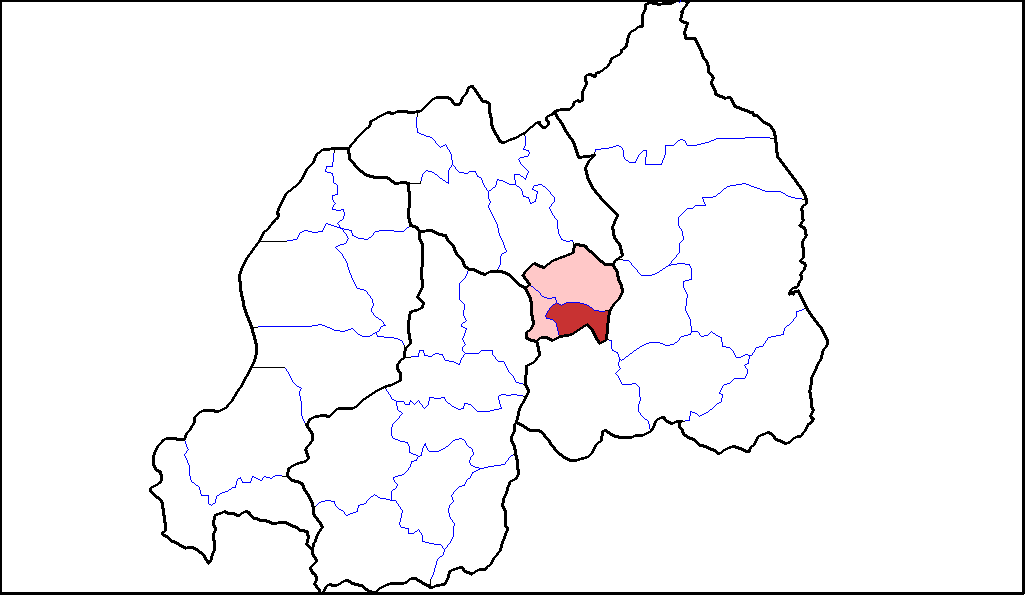
- Shown within the City of Kigali and Rwanda
- Country: Rwanda
- City: Kigali
- Capital: Kagarama

Government
  - Executive Administrator: Antoine Mutsinzi

Area
  - Total: 167 km^{2} (64 sq mi)

Population (2022)
  - Total: 491,731
  - Density: 2,940/km^{2} (7,630/sq mi)
- Website: https://www.kicukiro.gov.rw/

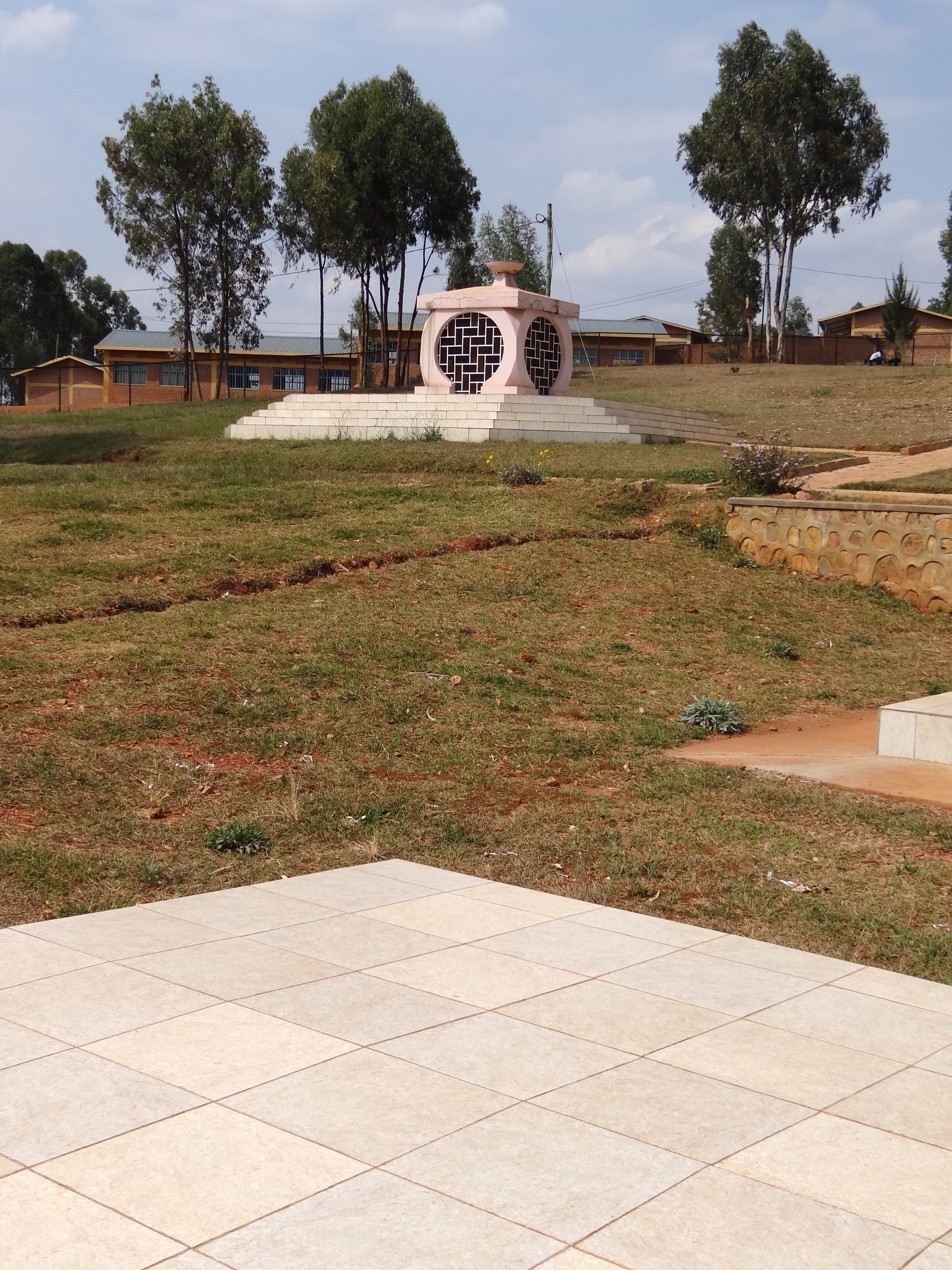
Mass Grave and Flame Monument at Nyanza Genocide Memorial Site

Kicukiro District is one of the three Districts which constitute the City of Kigali and is situated in the South-East of the City of Kigali. Is a district (akarere) located in the City of Kigali, Rwanda. Kicukiro is home to a thriving market, a number of non-governmental organisations and the Bralirwa Brewery. In addition, it is the headquarters for the Friends Church in Rwanda. Kicukiro District is also home to two major memorial sites associated with the Rwandan genocide. These are the Rebero Genocide Memorial Site where 14,400 victims are buried, and the Nyanza Genocide Memorial Site where 5,000 victims were killed after Belgian soldiers who were serving in the United Nations peacekeeping forces abandoned them.

== Geography ==
Map of the Kicukiro District by Sectors.

This district is located in the south-east city of Kigali, the capital of Rwanda. It is made up to ten (10) administrative sectors (Imirenge), Kagarama, Niboye, Gatenga, Gikondo, Gahanga, Kanombe, Nyarugunga, Kigarama, Masaka, 41cells (Utugali) and 333 Administrative villages (imidugudu). The district covers a total area of 166.7 km2 with about 319,661 inhabitants. It was established by Organic Law n°29/2005 organizing the administrative entities of the Republic of Rwanda, at the start of the second phase of decentralization in January 2006.

== Population ==
Historical Population of the Kicukiro District
Year	Population Kicukiro	Census of Population and Housing
2002	207,819	2002 Rwandan Census
2012	▲318,564	2012 Rwandan Census
2022	▲491,731	2022 Rwandan Census

The 4th Rwanda Population and Housing Census (PHC) has enumerated 318,564 residents in Kicukiro district, which represents 28.4% of the total population of Kigali City (1,132,686 residents). The population of Kicukiro district is predominantly male: 163,445 are men corresponding to 51.3% of the total population. Females are predominant in Masaka (50.6%) and Gahanga (50.2%) sectors. Gatenga, Kanombe, Kigarama, Nyarugunga and Masaka are the most populated sectors with more than 39 thousands residents each. Kagarama and Gikondo are the last populated sectors in Kicukiro district (14,385 and 17,146 inhabitants respectively). Each of them represents 4.5% of the total resident population of Kicukiro district.

Sectors of the Kicukiro District by population according to the 2022 census
N°	Sectors of Kicukiro District	Census (2022)
1°	Gahanga	79,082
2°	Masaka	78,788
3°	Kanombe	72,346
4°	Gatenga	67,084
5°	Kigarama	63,153
6°	Nyarugunga	49,247
7°	Niboye	26,912
8°	Kagarama	21,277
9°	Gikondo	19,803
10°	Kicukiro	14,039
Total	Kicukiro District	491,731

== Topography and climate ==
The hydrographs of the District are largely constituted by streams and rivers which form a part of the basin of the Akagera River. The main rivers are the Akagera and the Nyabarongo, which flows through the city of Kigali from Lake Muhazi. The District has four seasons. Two rainy seasons and two dry seasons, alternating in the following manner: Small dry season: December, January and February Big rainy season March, April and May Big Dry season June, July, August and September Small rainy season October and November. These seasons are often irregular due to world climate changes. Lower or higher limits of each Season cannot be determined accurately. The rainy season may drag on into the dry season and vice versa. Average temperature is 22 °C for a rainfall varying between 900 and 1150 mm of annual rain.

=== Integrated Polytechnic Regional Centre (IPRC) ===
The 4th Rwanda Population and Housing Census (PHC) has enumerated 318,564 residents in Kicukiro district, which represents 28.4% of the total population of Kigali City (1,132,686 residents). The population of Kicukiro district is predominantly male: 163,445 are men corresponding to 51.3% of the total population. Females are predominant in Masaka (50.6%) and Gahanga (50.2%) sectors. Gatenga, Kanombe, Kigarama, Nyarugunga and Masaka are the most populated sectors with more than 39 thousands residents each. Kagarama and Gikondo are the last populated sectors in Kicukiro district (14,385 and 17,146 inhabitants respectively). Each of them represents 4.5% of the total resident population of Kicukiro district.

== Education (some universities) ==
=== Kicukiro College of Technology ===
Kicukiro College of Technology is one of only two colleges of technology in Rwanda. The college opened in October 2008.

=== Integrated Polytechnic Regional Centre (IPRC) ===
IPRC was initially established by the Government of Rwanda in 2008 as "Kicukiro College of Technology (KCT)". Its core mission of the college was to develop and provide professional technical education at the level of diploma (A1). The college inherited the existing physical infrastructure from the ETO Kicukiro which seized to operate as a Technical Secondary School in 1994 when almost all of its equipment was vandalized during the genocide. After the genocide two secondary schools used the infrastructure consecutively up to January 2008.

In July 2008, the Government of Rwanda (GoR) decided to integrate Technical education, Vocational Education and Training into an integrated (TVET) system. Currently the college is among the two existing and operational Integrated Polytechnic Regional Centre (IPRC) in the country with its Mission and Vision changed to reflect its IPRC.
