= Loune Viaud =

Haitian health care activist

- Born: c. 1966; Port-Salut, Haiti
- Occupation: Executive Director
- Organization: Zanmi Lasante
- Known for: health care activism
- Awards: Robert F. Kennedy Human Rights Award (2002); Ms. magazine "Woman of the Year" (2003)

Loune Viaud (born c. 1966) is a former executive director of Zanmi Lasante, Partners in Health’s sister organization in Haiti. She won the 2002 Robert F. Kennedy Human Rights Award for her work with the group to provide health care in Haiti, and in 2003 was named one of Ms. magazine's "Women of the Year".

== Biography ==
Viaud was born in Port-Salut in southern Haiti. In the 1980s, she organized programs for street children in poor areas of Port-au-Prince alongside future president Jean-Bertrand Aristide. In 1988, she was present for the St Jean Bosco massacre, an attack on Aristide's church which left at least 13 dead; following the attack, she left the country, resettling in Boston. There she became active with Partners in Health, founding programs for the Haitian immigrant community including "Haitian Teens Confront AIDS".

In 1990, following a democratic election that brought Aristide the presidency, she returned to Haiti. That year, she helped found Proje Sante Fanm, Haiti's first women's health clinic. She has also begun a gender-awareness training program for health care workers as well as women's literacy projects and scholarship programs. She also implemented numerous projects for AIDS education and prevention. Partners in Health co-founder Paul Farmer said of her work, "It’s no exaggeration to claim that Loune’s pragmatic solidarity has reached hundreds of thousands of Haitian women living in poverty."

In 2002, Viaud won the Robert F. Kennedy Human Rights Award for her innovative human rights-based approach to establishing health care systems in Haiti. Her groundbreaking work encompasses rights-based HIV/AIDS treatment; advocating for fundamental rights including health, access to medicine, and clean water; and working with the local government and citizens to build the government’s capacity to respond to those human rights. During her acceptance speech, she stressed the need to represent the rights of the poor and that basic social and economic rights must be respected. Since receiving the award, she has joined forces with the RFK Center to work with the international community to implement a rights-based framework for assistance that prioritizes Haitian participation.

After the earthquake in January 2010, Viaud has been working to strengthen the Haitian health care sector by providing health care to the most vulnerable populations. She has partnered with the government and other organizations to help establish a children’s shelter for orphaned and abandoned children. Named Zamni Beni, meaning “Blessed Friends”, the shelter is staffed by caregivers responsible for providing ongoing educational, emotional, and psychosocial support to orphans.

She is currently the executive director of Zanmi Lasante. The organization offers free health care to hundreds of thousands of people. Her expertise informed a grant proposal to the Global Fund for AIDS, Tuberculouis and Malaria and resulted in a $67 million grant to Haiti and Zanmi Lasante. Making it the largest AIDS treatment program in the world. As of 2010, Zanmi Lasante employed over 5,000 Haitians and support 12 health facilities.

== Awards and honors ==
- Robert F. Kennedy Human Rights Laureate, Awarded in 2002
- Peace and Justice Award from the Cambridge Peace Commission, 2000
- Honorary Doctorate, Regis College, 2011
- Rang NASDAQ opening bell in New York City’s Times Square, 2011
