= Mountains Beyond Mountains =

2003 book by Tracy Kidder

Mountains Beyond Mountains: The Quest of Dr. Paul Farmer, A Man Who Would Cure the World
- Author: Tracy Kidder
- Language: English
- Genre: Non-fiction, Physicians, Biography, Missionaries, Health Care
- Publisher: Random House
- Publication date: 2003
- Publication place: United States
- Media type: Print Paperback
- Pages: 317 p. (US paperback edition)
- ISBN: 978-0-8129-7301-3 (US paperback edition)
- OCLC: 60527236

Mountains Beyond Mountains: The Quest of Dr. Paul Farmer, A Man Who Would Cure the World (2003) is a non-fiction, biographical work by American writer Tracy Kidder. The book traces the life of physician and anthropologist Paul Farmer, who died in Rwanda on February 21, 2022, at the age of 62, with particular focus on his work fighting tuberculosis in Haiti, Peru and Russia.

== Summary ==
The book is written from the view of author Tracy Kidder. It is set mainly in Haiti and Boston, Massachusetts. Kidder first met his subject, Dr. Paul Farmer, in Haiti in 1994.

Farmer was born in Massachusetts and grew up as one of six children in a poor household in Florida. He studied at Duke and Harvard, where he earned an M.D., as well as a Ph.D. in medical anthropology. The book details Farmer's work with the health and social justice organization Partners in Health, especially in Haiti, where it is known as Zanmi Lasante, Peru, and Russia.

Kidder describes Paul Farmer as follows:

"I was drawn to the man himself. He worked extraordinary hours. In fact, I don’t think he sleeps more than an hour or two most nights. Here was a person who seemed to be practicing more than he preached, who seemed to be living, as nearly as any human being can, without hypocrisy. A challenging person, the kind of person whose example can irritate you by making you feel you’ve never done anything as important, and yet, in his presence, those kinds of feelings tended to vanish. In the past, when I’d imagined a person with credentials like his, I’d imagined someone dour and self-righteous, but he was very friendly and irreverent, and quite funny. He seemed like someone I’d like to know, and I thought that if I did my job well, a reader would feel that way, too."

The book is primarily a biographical work broken into five parts.

PART I: Doktè Paul

Introduces Farmer's work at Brigham and Women's Hospital in Boston and at Zanmi Lasante founded by Partners In Health (PIH) in Cange, Haiti.

PART II: The Tin Roofs of Cange

Describes Farmer's family background and gives accounts of Farmer from sources close to him. Farmer's dedication to PIH led to the breaking off of his engagement to Ophelia Dahl, the daughter of noted author Roald Dahl and actress Patricia Neal. The two remained close friends, and Dahl continued to work for PIH.

PART III: Médicos Aventureros

In 1995, multidrug-resistant tuberculosis (MDR TB) claimed the life of a close friend known as Father Jack, in Lima, Peru. PIH co-founder Dr. Jim Kim convinces Farmer to extend PIH into Peru, where they fight against the rigid orders of the "directly observed treatment, short-course" (DOTS) program, which was promoted by the World Health Organization. PIH's efforts, largely supported financially by an American benefactor named Thomas J. White, led to the development of the "DOTS-plus" program for MDR TB. In 1996, Farmer married a Haitian medical anthropologist and community health specialist named Didi Bertrand.

PART IV: A Light Month for Travel

Follows Farmer from Haiti to Cuba, Paris, Russia, and other locations in his quest to treat infectious disease, mostly tuberculosis and AIDS. Discusses healthcare in Cuba and potential pitfalls of saying anything positive about the communist country.

PART V: O for the P

Discusses the concept of triage. "O for the P" refers to an expression within PIH that is a shortened form of saying “a preferential option for the poor”. PIH manages to get a Haitian boy with a rare cancer to Boston only to find there that the cancer had become inoperable. In 2000, PIH learns it has been awarded a $45 million grant from the Bill & Melinda Gates Foundation to combat MDR TB in Lima, along with other organizations. The book ends with the author, Farmer, and two other men taking a days-long journey on foot to visit a poor family afflicted with TB near Casse, Haiti.

== Awards and honors ==
- 2004 Book Sense Book of the Year Honor Book
- 2004 Lettre Ulysses Award for the Art of Reportage
- 2004 Boston Globe 100 Essential New England Books, #6
- 2004 ALA Notable Books for Adults
- 2003 New York Times Notable Book
- 2003 New York Times bestseller, first entered list at #14 on October 5, 2003.

== Edition adapted for young people ==
- Mountains Beyond Mountains (Adapted for Young People) with Michael French, 2014, 288 Pages, ISBN 9780385743198
