= Sheila Davis =

American nurse practitioner and CEO

- Education: Northeastern University, MGH Institute of Health Professions
- Employer: George Washington University Hospital; Massachusetts General Hospital; Partners In Health
- Awards: Fellow of the American Academy of Nursing

Sheila M. Davis is a Fellow in the American Academy of Nursing and the chief executive officer of the international nonprofit Partners In Health and an adult nurse practitioner at Massachusetts General Hospital (MGH). A specialist in HIV/AIDS and infectious diseases, she is known for her work in global health and human rights.

== Early life and education ==
Davis attended Northeastern University in Boston, Massachusetts. She received her Bachelor of Science in Nursing (BSN) in 1988. While a student at Northeastern, Davis became involved in the AIDS advocacy movement through groups like AIDS Action and Act Up. As a co-op student, she worked at the National Institutes of Health where AIDS protests were occurring. She became a support buddy for people who were dying of AIDS.

Davis later studied at Massachusetts General Hospital Institute of Health Professions, receiving a Masters in Nursing as an Adult Nurse Practitioner in 1997. She earned a Doctorate in Nursing Practice (DNP), focusing on global health, in 2008. Davis was one of the first three students to graduate from the DNP program.

== Career ==
After graduating from nursing school, Davis worked with HIV patients at George Washington University Hospital, in Washington, D.C. She became a member of the Association of Nurses in AIDS Care (ANAC). Through ANAC, she took the opportunity to work with AIDS patients in South Africa. Davis has since served on the National Board of ANAC.

In 1997, Davis joined the clinical practice of the Outpatient Clinic for the division of infectious diseases at Massachusetts General Hospital (MGH). In addition to serving as a nurse practitioner in the Infectious Disease Unit, Davis has been a clinical assistant professor of Nursing in the Institute of Health Professions at Massachusetts General Hospital.

In 1999 Davis began working with the Partners AIDS Research Center at MGH, dealing with community outreach and HIV treatment in South Africa.

In 2003, Sheila Davis and Chris Shaw from MGH founded Sibusiso, a Boston-based, non-profit organization that helps provide medical support to communities in South Africa. Originally focusing on malnutrition and rural nursing clinics, its programs expanded to support HIV/AIDS patients in areas with poor healthcare access. Sibusiso was active in South Africa from 2004-2010.

As one of the first twenty Carl Wilkens fellows selected by the Genocide Intervention Network, in 2009, Davis represented 12 million nurses. She advocates for human rights, social justice and protection from genocide, emphasizing the important role that can be played by nurse practitioners.

Davis has served on the editorial board of the international peer-reviewed academic journal Health and Human Rights.

As of October 2010, Davis became a nursing coordinator for Partners In Health (PIH), an international mon-profit. Following the 2010 earthquake in Haiti, she helped to plan and open Hôpital Universitaire de Mirebalais, a 300-bed university hospital in Mirebalais, Haiti.

In 2012, Davis was chosen as an Executive Nurse Fellow of the Robert Wood Johnson Foundation, a three-year fellowship focusing on national health care strategy.

Davis became the Chief Nursing Officer at Partners In Health as of March 2013. In September 2014, Davis became Chief of Ebola Response at PIH. She led the Ebola Response Team in West Africa from 2014 to 2016, and later helped to rebuild health services in Liberia and Sierra Leone. She led crisis response in Haiti following Hurricane Matthew in October 2016, and in Lima, Peru following spring floods in 2017. In addition to being Chief Nursing Officer, Davis became Chief of Clinical Operations at PIH as of January 2017. As of July 1, 2019, Davis became CEO of Partners In Health, succeeding Gary Gottlieb. She is the first nurse to become CEO of the organization.

“Nurses work in all aspects of healthcare systems and can play a key role in redesigning health care... From the patient to the policy level, we need to redesign health care and design new models of care with a community focus.” Sheila Davis

== Awards and honors ==
- 2008, Fellow, American Academy of Nursing
- 2009, Carl Wilken Fellow, Genocide Intervention Network
- 2012, Executive Nurse Fellow, Robert Wood Johnson Foundation
- 2020, Living Legend, American Nurses Association of Massachusetts
