= Isata Dumbuya =

Sierra Leonean midwife

- Dumbuya in 2023
- Born: 1970 or 1971 (age 55–56); Kono, Sierra Leone
- Occupation: Midwife
- Organization: Partners in Health
- Known for: Working to lower the maternal mortality rates in Sierra Leone
- Awards: Time's 2026 Women of the Year

Isata Dumbuya (born 1970 or 1971) is a Sierra Leonean midwife best known for her work with Partners in Health to build the Paul E. Farmer Maternal Center of Excellence in Koidu. She is the Director of Nursery and Midwifery for Partners in Health Sierra Leone's Reproductive, Maternal, Neonatal, Child and Adolescent Health program.

== Life and career ==
Dumbuya was born in Kono District, Sierra Leone. She spent twenty-five years working as a midwife in the National Health Service of the United Kingdom, before returning to Sierra Leone in 2018 due to her and her colleagues' concerns over the maternal mortality rate in the country.

While working at the Koidu Government Hospital, she became involved with Partners In Health, a non-profit organization concerned with healthcare in developing countries. She became the Director of the Reproductive, Maternal, Newborn, Adolescent and Child Health program of Partners In Health's Sierra Leone branch before becoming Director of Nursery and Midwifery in February 2026.

She was involved with the design of the Paul E. Farmer Maternal Center of Excellence and the training of its staff, with the facility being open to patients in February 14, 2026.

Dumbuya was named one of Time magazine's Women of the Year in 2026.
