= Zanmi Lasante =

Haitian branch of Partners in Health

Coordinates: 18°56′8″N 71°59′36″W

Zanmi Lasante is a sister organization to the Boston-based Partners In Health that operates out of Cange in the central plateau of Haiti. The name, Zanmi Lasante, means Partners In Health in Haitian Creole. It was built in 1985 to treat patients who were incapable of paying hospital fees. Services cost the equivalent of about eighty American cents for everyone "except for women and children, the destitute, and anyone who was seriously ill." Additionally, no one may be turned away.

Its facilities include two operating wards, "adult and pediatric inpatient wards, an infectious disease center, an outpatient clinic, a women's health clinic (Proje Sante Fanm), ophthalmology and general medicine clinics, two laboratories, a pharmaceutical warehouse, a Red Cross blood bank, and radiographic services." It currently has eight sites in the area of the central plateau of Haiti and serves a catchment area of 1.2 million Haitian peasant farmers

Zanmi Lasante is the largest non-government healthcare provider in Haiti. Its staff includes over 4000 people, most of them Haitians. The staff at Zanmi Lasante is able to treat most common tuberculosis patients for $150–200, while the same case in the U.S. would cost between $15000-20000.

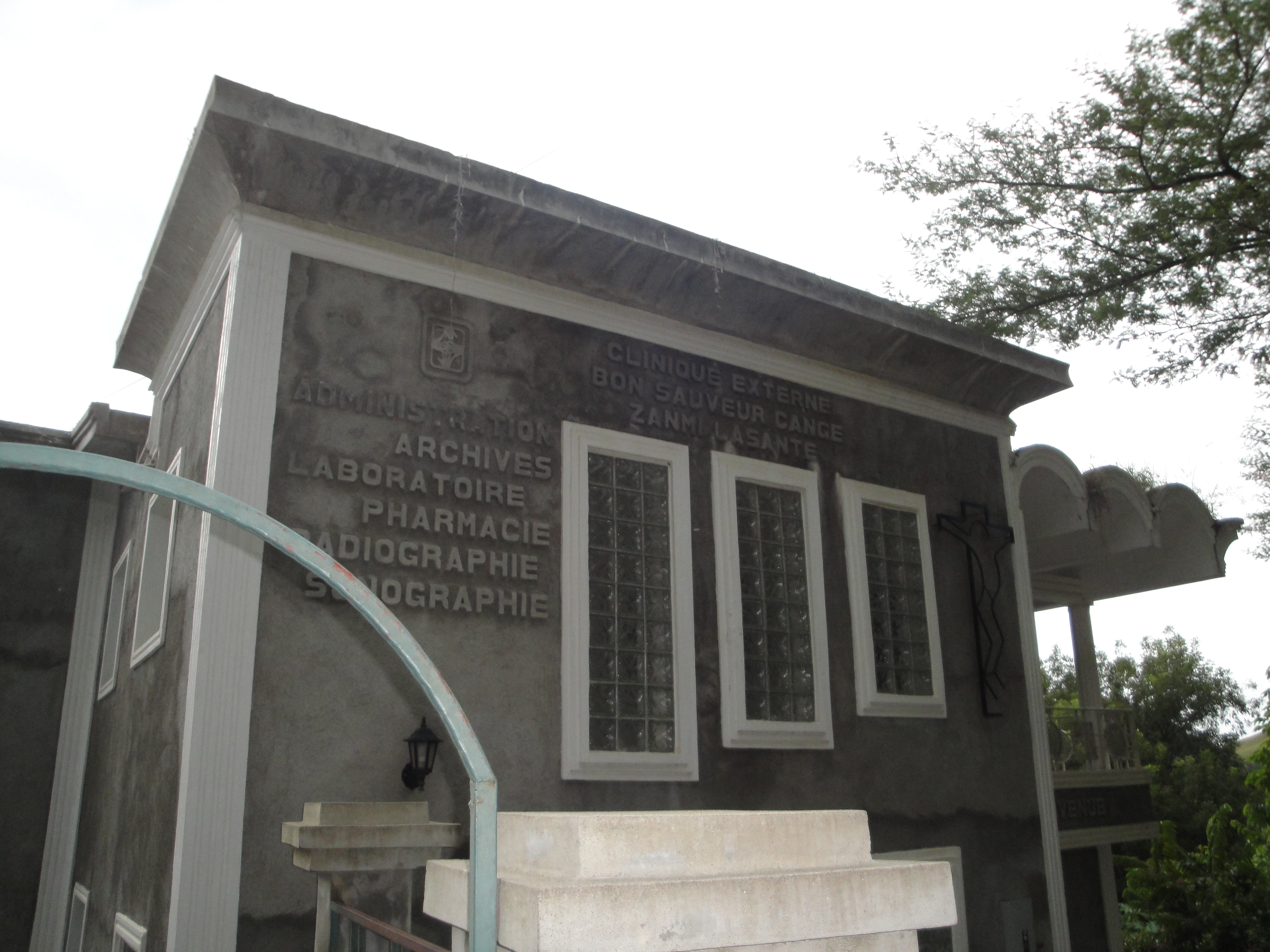
Zanmi Lasante, located in Cange, Haiti

== History ==
Zanmi Lasante was created by Paul Farmer, Ophelia Dahl, Tom White, Jim Yong Kim, and Todd McCormack in 1983. It was formed to provide medical care to a small village named Cange in the central plateau of Haiti, that Farmer described as: "amazingly, biblically, dry and barren." Farmer was horrified by the living conditions that the people living in Cange suffered: "An individual might exist in misery this great almost anywhere, but it was hard to imagine an entire community poorer and sicker than this."

It began as a small community clinic, and its mission of servicing the poor was inspired by an idea that Farmer valued: "doctors are lawyers for the poor" -Rudolph Virchow.

Paul decided to create his own health clinic after visiting the other major healthcare clinics and hospitals in Haiti and being disappointed that they refused care to individuals without money

Zanmi Lasante faced Haitian opposition during its initial stages. The hospital outwardly supported the democratically elected president Father Jean-Bertrand Aristide in 1990. When Aristide was removed from power by the Haitian Junta, or military, Farmer spoke out against them; thus Zanmi Lasante became at odds with the military. On multiple occasions, the military investigated the medical complex, threatening to shut it down, or to attack the staff. Only the threat that Zanmi Lasante was the best chance at healing a Haitian soldier when he inevitably became ill was enough to deter them. The clinic saw three years of hardship, with patients afraid to seek medical treatment for fear of getting attacked by Haitian Junta, and Farmer forbidden from entering the country. Fortunately, Aristide was reinstated as president in 1994, and Partners in Health was able to continue improving upon Zanmi Lasante.

Zanmi Lasante built schools, houses, and water sanitation systems throughout its catchment area to prevent disease as well as treat it once it arose. Zanmi Lasante has helped educate 9,400 Haitian children. Farmer set up Zanmi Lasante to be a fully functioning, autonomous healthcare system even in his absence. In fact, Zanmi Lasante has not lost a tuberculosis patient in 12 years (at the time Tracy Kidder wrote Mountains Beyond Mountains ).

In 2002, the organization's Director of Strategic Planning Loune Viaud won the Robert F. Kennedy Human Rights Award for her work, and in 2003 was named one of Ms. magazine's "Women of the Year".

== See also ==
- Paul Farmer
