= Afya Foundation =

U.S. non-profit organization

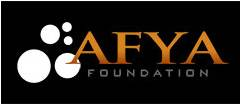
- Headquarters: Yonkers, New York
- Website: http://www.afyafoundation.org/

Afya Foundation is a 501(c)(3) not-for-profit organization based in Yonkers, New York. It was founded in 2007 by Danielle Butin, MPH, OTR after a trip to Tanzania, where she encountered the dire circumstances and severely limited medical resources of their medical clinics. Afya, which means "good health" in Swahili seeks to spread "Good Health Through Giving," and does so by providing medical supplies, consumables, sustainable equipment, and community outreach supplies to international health clinics.

== Mission ==
The primary goal of Afya is to bring good health to those who need it most. One way in which it accomplishes this goal is by collecting donations of surplus medical supplies from New York hospitals. These supplies are stored temporarily in the Yonkers warehouse until volunteers load them into 40 foot containers bound for various international locations. Afya tailors its shipments to the needs of specific communities by maintaining an up-to-date computer-based inventory menu from which international health organizations and professionals can self-select medical supplies from the warehouse via the web.

== Programs ==
Shipments of Supplies: Afya has sent over 30 supply filled 40 foot containers to Haiti, Ghana, Ethiopia, Rwanda, Malawi, and Sierra Leone. Included in these shipments are a range of items from ultrasound machines and operating tables to soccer balls and pens. A wide range of vital supplies are required for clinicians to provide adequate care to the members of the communities they serve. In addition to shipping 40 foot containers, duffel bags can also be requested and shipped with medical personnel who are making a specific international aid trips. Supplies that are generally accepted include: Tents, Sleeping bags, Umbrellas, Rain boots, Bug Spray, Crutches, Wheelchairs, Gloves, Water Purification Tablets, Ensure/Liquid Food, Personal Care Items, Gauze, Bandages, Sheets, and Blankets.

Gloria's Gathering: provides a venue for mourning friends and family to honor a loved one by donating rehabilitated medical supplies that were used during recuperation and end of life that would otherwise wind up in a landfill. After rehabilitation, these supplies are distributed in developing nations throughout Africa and the Caribbean. The project is named in honor of Gloria Bobrow, wife of Edwin Bobrow: Afya advisor board member, author, management consultant, and retired Adjunct Associate Professor at NYU.

Afya Clubs: Over 15 clubs across the country have already been founded by middle school, high school, and college students to spread the word about Afya and collect supplies in their own communities. Any and all youth are encouraged to get involved and start their own clubs in order to help Afya to continue in providing vital supplies to international health clinics and communities in need. Alex, a teenager from the New York area ran a collection drive for soccer equipment. He started by getting in touch with local youth soccer commissioner, to set up donation boxes at local youth soccer games. By the end of his project, he had managed to collect enough soccer equipment to furnish an entire youth soccer league in Neno, Malawi. The Women's Track and Field team at Haverford College recently completed a collection campaign. Over 100 pairs of shoes were donated and shipped to the Afya warehouse, where they will be distributed to those in need.

== Response to 2010 Haiti earthquake ==
On January 12, 2010 an earthquake of magnitude 7.0 M_{w} shook Haiti. It has been estimated that the lives of 3 million people have been affected by the event. Within two days, Afya shipped a 40-foot container holding mattresses, respirators, backboards, and surgical packs to aid the ailing nation. Through their collaboration with Partners in Health, Afya shipped 2500 pounds of supplies via airplane, along with four additional 40-foot containers within two weeks of the initial event. On January 28, 2010 Afya shipped its sixth container to Haiti, increasing the amount of supplies sent by Afya to over 400,000 pounds of vital supplies targeted to relief workers to aid them in their amazing efforts. As long as there is a need for these supplies, the Afya Foundation plans to provide as much aid as they are able.
