= Thomas J. White (businessman) =

American businessman and philanthropist

- Born: March 10, 1920; Cambridge, Massachusetts, U.S.
- Died: January 7, 2011 (aged 90)
- Education: Harvard College

Thomas J. White (March 10, 1920 – January 7, 2011) was an American businessman and philanthropist. He was a co-founder of Partners In Health and estimated that he gave away more than $75 million to various charities.

== Early life, education, and military service ==
Thomas J. White was born on March 10, 1920, in Cambridge, Massachusetts, to Joseph F. White and Dorothy Aylward White. He attended Cambridge Latin School and graduated in 1942 with a bachelor's degree in Romance languages from Harvard College. He joined the U.S. Army a week later to become a paratrooper and an officer. During World War II, he was an aide to Brigadier General Maxwell Taylor, commander of the 101st Airborne Division, with whom he parachuted into France the night before the Normandy landings. He later parachuted into Holland. He received a Silver Star and a Bronze Star with an oak leaf cluster for his service.

== Career ==
After the war, White joined his family's construction firm, J.F. White Contracting Co., named after his father who founded the company. White became majority owner and chief executive of the company. During his tenure, J.F. White Contracting helped build the Charles River Dam, Foxboro Stadium, Park Plaza Hotel, and part of Boston's MBTA subway system.

== Political contributions ==
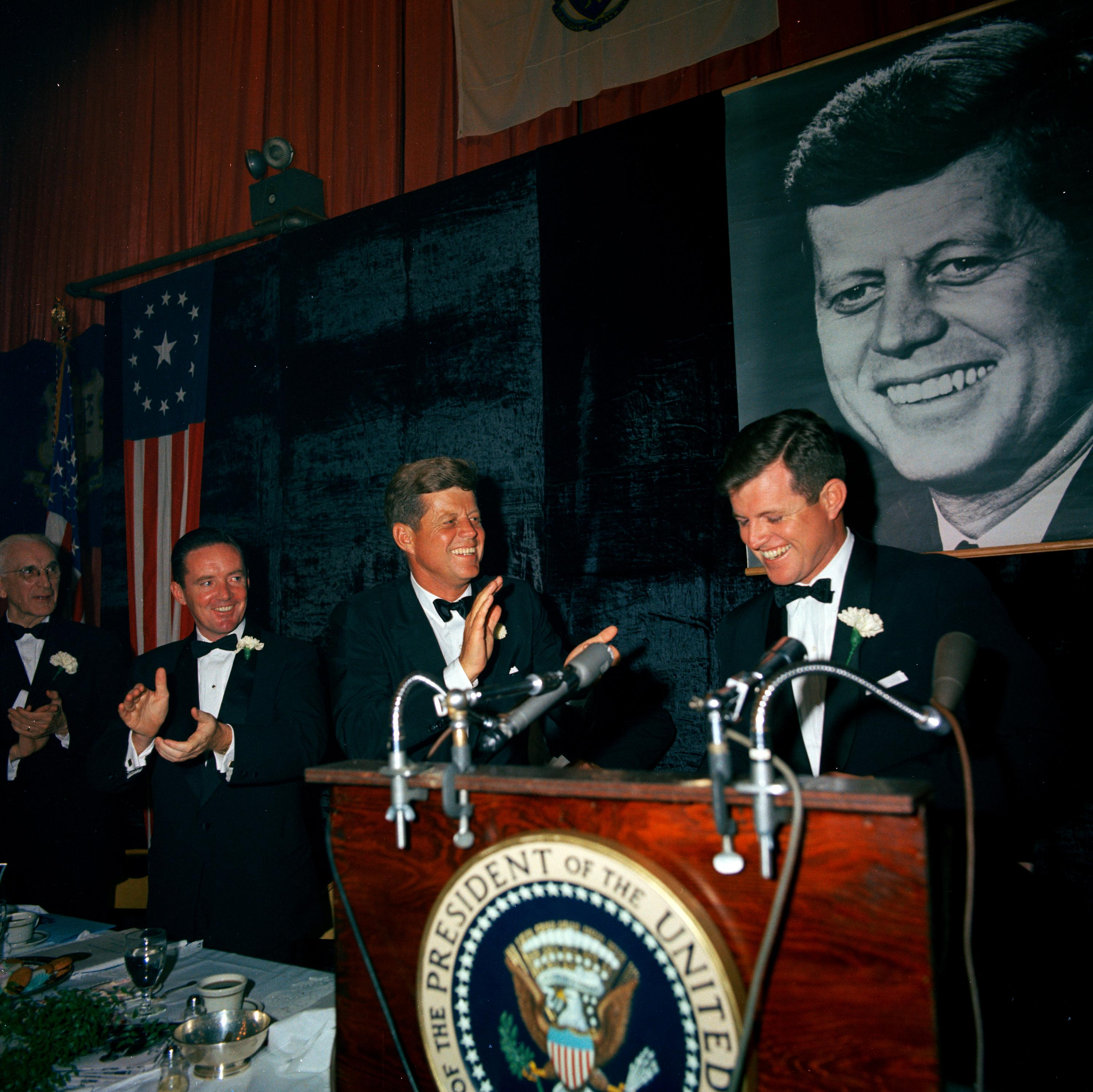
White between Speaker John W. McCormack and President John F. Kennedy in 1963.

White was a major fundraiser for John F. Kennedy and a friend of the family. White was the chief organizer of fund-raising efforts in New England.

== Philanthropy ==
After ensuring his family's financial stability, White resolved "to die as close to penniless as possible" by giving away his wealth to charity. He estimated a few years before his death that he had given away more than $75 million to various philanthropic causes; he also kept a stack of bills in his pocket which he would distribute to random strangers he met.

In 1987, he co-founded Partners In Health with Paul Farmer, Ophelia Dahl, Jim Yong Kim, and Todd McCormack. White provided the initial funding to the non-profit organization with the goal of developing the healthcare systems in developing countries. White reportedly raised $30 million for the charity, with $20 million of it coming from White himself.

== Personal life and death ==
In 1947, White married Margaret Flynn, with whom he had seven children. They later divorced. In 1971, he married Lois Driscoll, who herself had six children.

White died on January 7, 2011, at the age of 90.
