= Inamori Ethics Prize =

Annual award

The Inamori Ethics Prize is an annual award presented by the Inamori International Center for Ethics and Excellence at Case Western Reserve University. The prize honors exemplary ethical international leaders "whose actions and influence have greatly improved the condition of humankind". The prize was first awarded in 2008 to Dr. Francis Collins, an American physician who is credited with discovering a number of genes associated with human diseases.

The Inamori Ethics prize is also awarded with a monetary award, which is to be used in the recipients' ongoing projects. Each year, the honoree of the prize delivers a public lecture about their ongoing work at Case Western Reserve University.

In years in which the Inamori Ethics Prize is not awarded, the Inamori Center's Conversations on JUSTICE series is held.

== Recipients ==
- 2023: Myroslava Gongadze, journalist, free press and human rights advocate.
- 2022-2023: Conversations on JUSTICE: Inequities in Healthcare (in honor of the late Dr. Paul Farmer). The prize was scheduled to be awarded to American medical anthropologist and physician Paul Farmer, but was not given due to his untimely death and the prize not being awarded posthumously.
- 2021: Silvia Fernández de Gurmendi, first female president of the International Criminal Court, for her work as a leader in international justice, humanitarian law, and human rights
- 2020-2021: Conversations on JUSTICE (a series of virtual events featuring former prize-winners during the height of the pandemic)
- 2019: LeVar Burton, actor and activist, for his work to support AIDS research and children's literacy and as an ethical leader in the arts
- 2018: Farouk El-Baz, geologist and NASA space scientist, for his work locating essential natural resources
- 2017: Marian Wright Edelman, civil rights attorney and Children's Defense Fund founder, for her successes in improving the lives of children
- 2016: Peter Eigen, attorney and founder of Transparency International, for his fight against corruption which hinders economic growth, social welfare, and justice
- 2015: Martha Nussbaum, philosopher and professor of law
- 2014: Denis Mukwege
- 2013: Yvon Chouinard, founder of Patagonia.
- 2012: David Suzuki, science educator and climate activist.
- 2011: Beatrice Mtetwa, human rights lawyer and free press activist.
- 2010: Stan Brock, television personality, philanthropist, and founder of Remote Area Medical.
- 2009: Mary Robinson, former President of Ireland and United Nations High Commissioner for Human Rights.
- 2008: Francis Collins, physician-geneticist, led the Human Genome Project.
