= Tracy Kidder =

American writer (1945–2026)

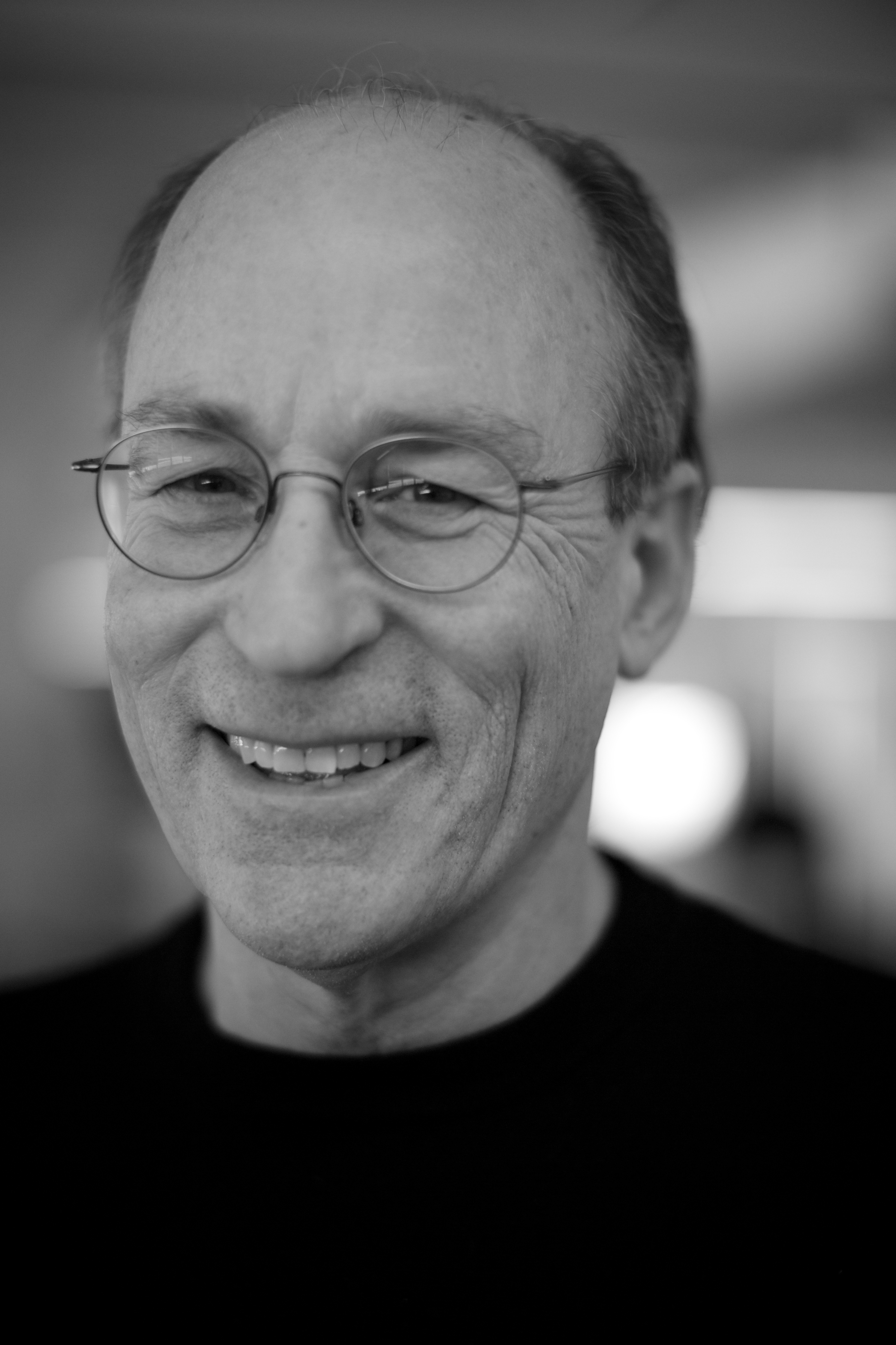
- Kidder in 2013
- Born: John Tracy Kidder; November 12, 1945; New York City, U.S.
- Died: March 24, 2026 (aged 80); Boston, Massachusetts, U.S.
- Education: Harvard University (BA); University of Iowa (MFA)
- Spouse: Frances Gray Toland (m. 1971)
- Children: 2
- Writing career
- Genre: Non-fiction
- Notable works: The Soul of a New Machine; Mountains Beyond Mountains
- Notable awards: Pulitzer Prize for General Nonfiction; 1982 The Soul of a New Machine
- Literary movement: Literary journalism
- Website: tracykidder.com

John Tracy Kidder (November 12, 1945 – March 24, 2026) was an American writer of nonfiction books. He received the Pulitzer Prize for The Soul of a New Machine (1981), about the creation of a new computer at Data General Corporation. Kidder received praise and awards for other works, including Mountains Beyond Mountains (2003), a biography of physician and anthropologist Paul Farmer, the founder of Partners in Health.

Kidder was considered a literary journalist because of the strong story line and personal voice in his writing. He cited as his writing influences John McPhee, A. J. Liebling, and George Orwell. In a 1984 interview he said, "McPhee has been my model. He's the most elegant of all the journalists writing today, I think."

He wrote in a 1994 essay, "In fiction, believability may have nothing to do with reality or even plausibility. It has everything to do with those things in nonfiction. I think that the nonfiction writer's fundamental job is to make what is true believable."

== Early life and education ==
John Tracy Kidder was born in New York City on November 12, 1945. He graduated from Phillips Academy in 1963. He attended Harvard College, originally majoring in political science, but switching to English after taking a course in creative writing from Robert Fitzgerald. He received a BA degree from Harvard in 1967.

Receiving an ROTC commission, he entered the United States Army, rising to the rank of first lieutenant. He served as a military intelligence officer in Vietnam from 1967 to 1969, receiving a Bronze Star, but did not see combat. After returning from Vietnam, he wrote for some time, including an unpublished war novel, Ivory Fields, and was admitted to the Iowa Writers' Workshop. He received an MFA degree from the University of Iowa in 1974.

== Career ==
Kidder wrote his first book, The Road to Yuba City: A Journey into the Juan Corona Murders, while at the University of Iowa. The Atlantic Monthly commissioned the work, and he continued writing as a freelancer for the magazine during the 1970s. The Road to Yuba City was a critical failure, and Kidder said in a 1995 interview that

I can't say anything intelligent about that book, except that I learned never to write about a murder case. The whole experience was disgusting, so disgusting, in fact, that in 1981 I went to Doubleday and bought back the rights to the book. I don't want The Road to Yuba City to see the light of day again.

He said that, unlike many other writers, he was not much influenced by his Vietnam experience: "Of course, whenever you're in an experience like Vietnam, it is bound to influence your work; it's inevitable, but I really don't think it greatly shaped me as a writer." His works for The Atlantic Monthly include several essays and short stories about the Vietnam War, including "The Death of Major Great" (1974), "Soldiers of Misfortune" (1978), and "In Quarantine" (1980). Writing in 1997, David Bennett rated these three pieces "among the finest reporting to come out of Vietnam".

Kidder's second book, The Soul of a New Machine (1981), was much more successful than his first. His account of the complex community and environment of programming and computer development won the Pulitzer Prize for General Nonfiction in 1982. He continued to write nonfiction books and articles, which were well received by critics. Kidder's 2009 book, Strength in What Remains, is a portrait of a man who survived the genocide in Burundi.

He explored a wide range of topics through his books—House (1985), a "biography" of a couple having their first house built, and the people involved in the project; Among Schoolchildren (1989), set in an elementary-school classroom in Holyoke, Massachusetts, and reflecting on American education through the lives of these 20 children and their teacher; and Old Friends (1993), which explored the daily lives and personal growth of a pair of elderly men in a nursing home.

In fall 2010 Kidder was selected as the first A. M. Rosenthal Writer-in-Residence at the Harvard Kennedy School's Shorenstein Center on Media, Politics and Public Policy. At the Center, he worked with his longtime editor, Richard Todd, on a book about writing, titled Good Prose: The Art of Nonfiction. He lectured to students and did research to identify his next narrative subject.

== Death ==
Kidder died of lung cancer in Boston on March 24, 2026, at the age of 80.

== Personal life ==
He met his wife, Frances Gray Toland, in 1970 in Boston. They married in 1971 and moved to Iowa, while Kidder attended the Iowa Writer's Workshop. After he graduated, they returned to Massachusetts and settled in Williamsburg, Massachusetts. They had a son and a daughter.

== Selected awards ==
- Pulitzer Prize for General Nonfiction, 1982, for The Soul of a New Machine
- National Book Award for Nonfiction, 1982, for The Soul of a New Machine (Note: This was the award for hardcover "General Nonfiction". From 1980 to 1983 in National Book Awards history there were several nonfiction subcategories, including General Nonfiction, with dual hardcover and paperback awards in most categories.)
- Robert F. Kennedy Book Award, 1989–1990, for Among Schoolchildren
- L. L. Winship/PEN New England Award, 1990, for Among Schoolchildren
- Ambassador Book Award in American Studies, 1990, for Among Schoolchildren
- Golden Plate Award of the American Academy of Achievement, 2001
- Lettre Ulysses Award (2nd prize), 2004, for Mountains Beyond Mountains

== Books ==
- Kidder, Tracy (1974). The Road to Yuba City: A Journey into the Juan Corona Murders. Garden City: Doubleday. ISBN 978-0-385-02865-3.
- —— (1981). The Soul of a New Machine. Boston: Little, Brown. ISBN 978-0-316-49170-9.
- —— (1985). House. Boston: Houghton Mifflin. ISBN 0-618-00191-3.
- —— (1990) [1989]. Among Schoolchildren. New York: Avon Books. ISBN 0-380-71089-7.
- —— (1993). Old Friends. Boston: Houghton Mifflin. ISBN 978-0-395-71088-3.
- —— (2000) [1999]. Home Town. New York: Washington Square Press. ISBN 0-671-78521-4.
- —— (2003). Mountains Beyond Mountains. New York: Random House. ISBN 0-375-50616-0.
- —— (2005). My Detachment: A Memoir. New York: Random House. ISBN 0-375-50615-2.
- —— (2009). Strength in What Remains. New York: Random House. ISBN 978-1-4000-6621-6.
- ——; Todd, Richard (2013). Good Prose: The Art of Nonfiction. New York: Random House. ISBN 978-1-4000-6975-0.
- —— (2016). A Truck Full of Money: One Man's Quest to Recover from Great Success. New York: Random House. ISBN 978-0-8129-9524-4.
- —— (2023). Rough Sleepers: Dr. Jim O'Connell's Urgent Mission to Bring Healing to Homeless People. New York: Random House. ISBN 978-1-9848-0143-2.
