= Paul E. Farmer Maternal Center of Excellence =

- Location within Sierra Leone

Geography
- Location: Koidu, Kono District, Sierra Leone
- Coordinates: 8°38′53″N 10°57′55″W

Organisation
- Type: Maternity hospital

Services
- Beds: 166

History
- Constructed: 2021
- Opened: 2026

The Paul E. Farmer Maternal Center of Excellence (MCOE) is a maternity hospital located in Koidu, Kono District, Sierra Leone. Upon its completion in 2026, the hospital contained the first neonatal intensive care unit in the country.

The hospital was built in a partnership between the Sierra Leonean Ministry of Health and Sanitation, Partners in Health, and other international non-profits. YouTubers John and Hank Green contributed significant fundraising for the hospital's construction through their Nerdfighteria internet community.

== Background ==
In 2016, UNICEF reported that Sierra Leone had the world's highest maternal mortality rate, with 1,360 mothers dying in every 100,000 live births. Sierra Leone also had among the highest rates of death for children under the age of 5. One challenge to the Sierra Leonean health care system has been a shortage of health care workers and available infrastructure for hospitals. This situation was worsened by the 2013-2016 Ebola epidemic, which killed approximately 7% of health care workers in the nation. In 2020, Sierra Leone had the lowest density of medical doctors in the region, with only 3 doctors per 100,000 residents.

Beginning in 2018, the Sierra Leonean government turned its focus to improving the quality of the country's health care facilities with assistance from non-governmental organizations and non-profits. One result of the reinvestment was the reopening of the Koidu Government Hospital in Koidu, which had been closed during the Ebola epidemic due to a lack of equipment, utilities, and staff. The Maternal Center of Excellence would later open as part of the KGH complex.

The World Bank reported that between 2013 and 2023, the rate of maternal deaths in Sierra Leone had been reduced by more than 50%. Mortality for children under 5 had reduced by 32% in the same period. The Sierra Leonean Ministry of Health and Sanitation referred to the opening of the MCOE as "central to the government's healthcare transformation agenda."

== Development ==
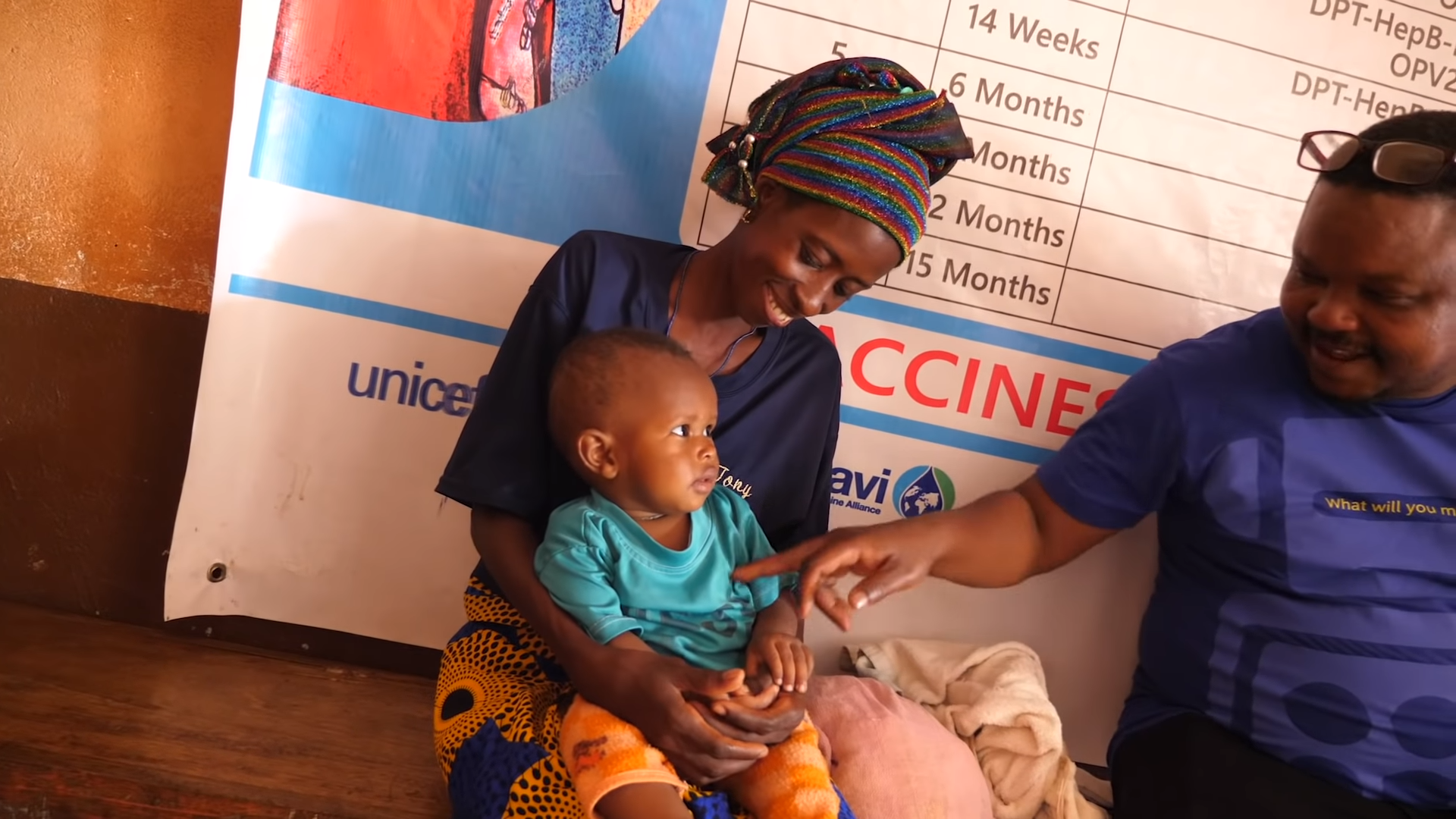
Child and adults at Koidu Government Hospital in Kono District, Sierra Leone, 2019.

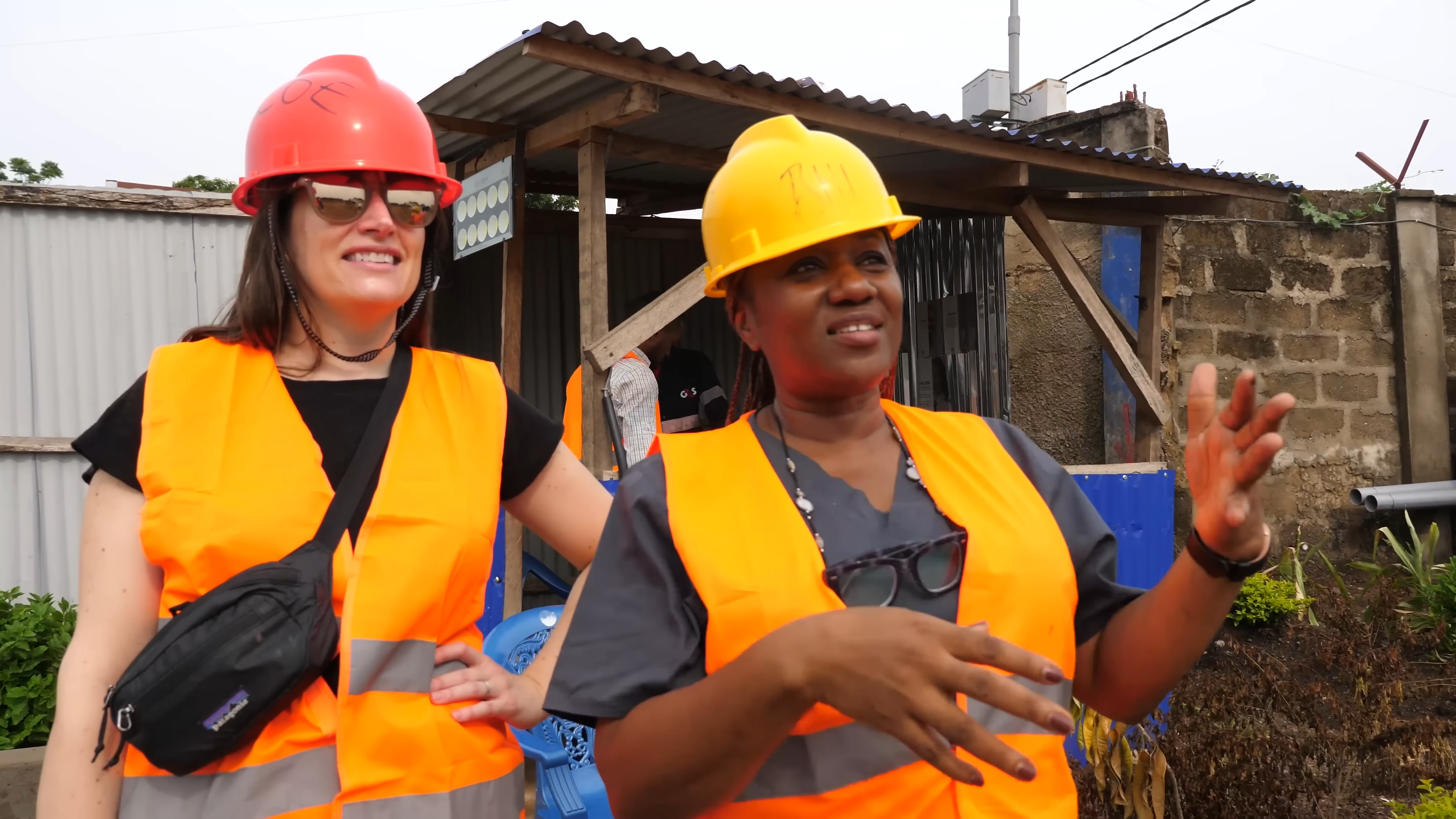
Sarah Urist Green and Isata Dumbuya (head of maternal health at Koidu Government Hospital) look onto construction work of the Maternal Center of Excellence, 2023.

Funding for the construction and staffing of the MCOE was provided through a partnership between the Sierra Leonean government and Partners in Health, an international healthcare non-profit that had been operating in the country since 2014. The hospital was named in memory of Partners in Health co-founder Paul Farmer, an American medical anthropologist and physician who died before the hospital's completion.

Brothers John Green and Hank Green, American writers and YouTubers, raised approximately $50 million for the hospital through personal contributions and fundraising by their online community, Nerdfighteria. Profit-sharing from the brothers' online sales of socks, soaps, and tea accounted for $12 million of total funds towards the hospital.

Construction began in 2021 at the Koidu Government Hospital campus in Koidu, Kono District. The construction was overseen by the non-profit Build Health International. About 60% of the construction workers were women, many of whom were learning their trades for the first time. Investment in maternal health and a reputation for good working conditions drew the unusually high ratio of women to the site.

Sierra Leonean President Julius Maada Bio attended a ceremonial ribbon-cutting at the hospital in October 2025. The MCOE opened for patients on February 14, 2026. Upon opening, the hospital employed approximately 200 staff, including 51 midwives. Thirteen babies were successfully delivered at the hospital on its opening day.

== Design and services ==
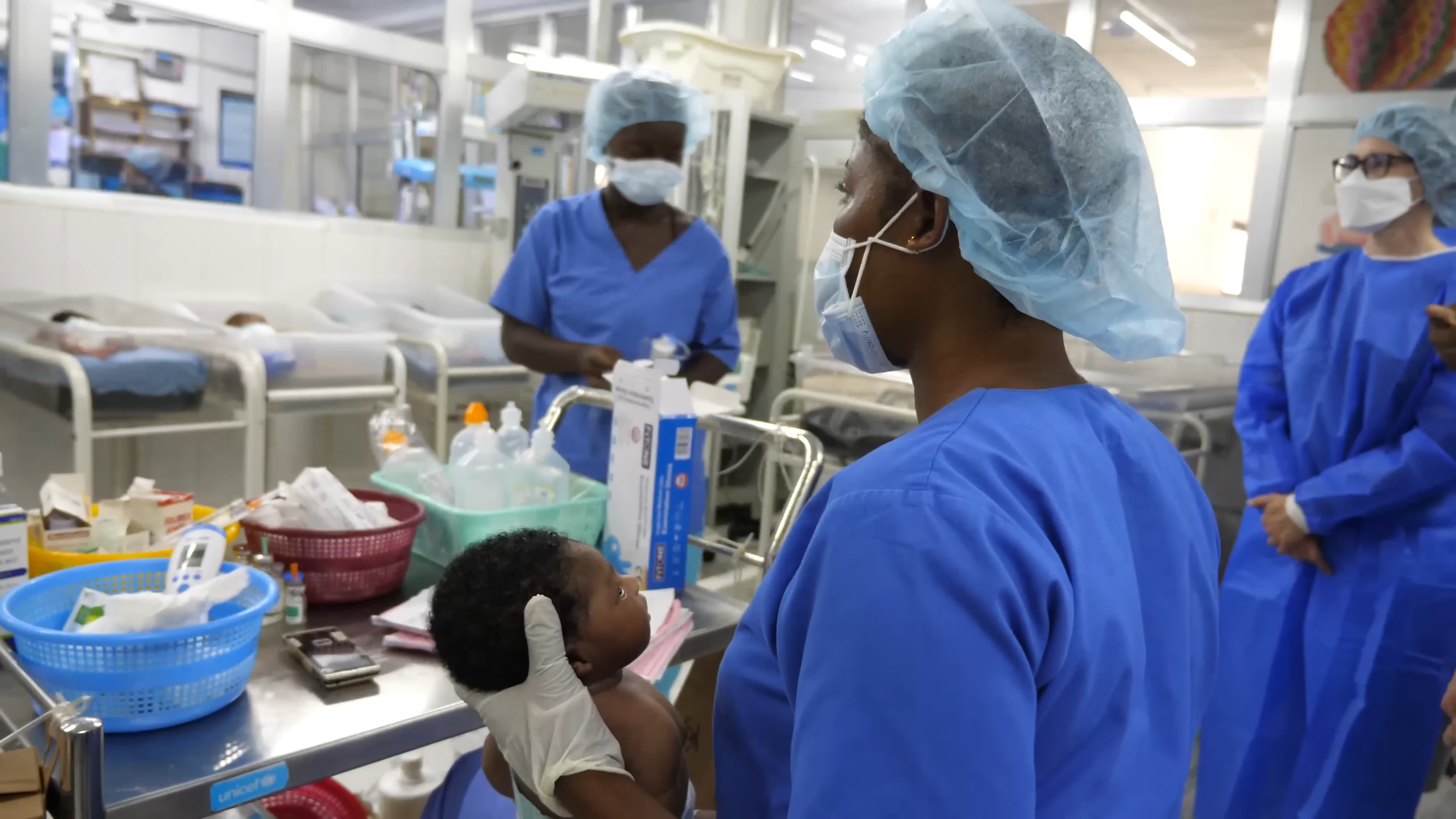
Inside the Special Care Baby Unit (SCBU) of Koidu Government Hospital before the completion of the MCOE, 2023.

The Maternal Center of Excellence has 120 beds available for patients, an expansion of the 48 beds previously available for maternal care in the Koidu Government Hospital complex. The birthing center contains operating rooms and the first dedicated neonatal intensive care unit (NICU) opened in Sierra Leone. The NICU is equipped to care for premature and critically ill newborns.

The hospital has two major operating theaters and one minor procedure facility. It is one of the few hospitals in Sierra Leone with wall-piped oxygen available for medical rooms. The site also contains a self-contained water treatment plant. It is connected to the country's national electrical grid, but uses backup generators, voltage regulators, and other power-saving measures to decrease reliance on national power availability.

Laundry, bathrooms, waste disposal, and other sanitation measures were designed to slow the spread of infectious diseases like Ebola that had overwhelmed the country's health care systems during the 2013-2016 epidemic.

Nutritional education is provided by nurses in partnership with the MCOE's kitchen services. An antenatal ward provides medical care to pregnant mothers, while a postnatal ward helps mothers recover from childbirth. A separate mother's dormitory gives space for mothers and their newborns to rest together.
