= Joia Mukherjee =

American public health doctor

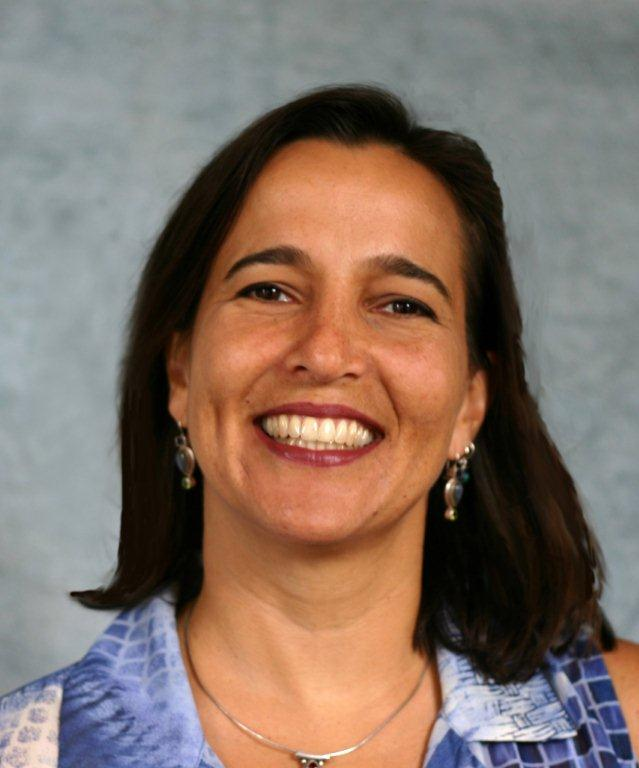
- Born: Joia Stapleton Mukherjee; 1964 (age 61–62)
- Education: University of Michigan
- Occupations: Medical Doctor; Master of Public Health; Associate Professor
- Known for: Academia; Community service Global healthcare

Joia Stapleton Mukherjee (born 1964) is an associate professor with the Division of Global Health Equity at the Brigham and Women's Hospital and the Department of Global Health and Social Medicine at Harvard Medical School. She served as Chief Medical Officer of Partners In Health from 2000 to 2025 and is currently its Senior Clinical and Academic Advisor, an international medical non-profit founded by Paul Farmer, Ophelia Dahl, and Jim Kim. She trained in Infectious Disease, Internal Medicine, and Pediatrics at the Massachusetts General Hospital and has an MPH from Harvard School of Public Health. Dr. Mukherjee has been involved in health care access and human rights issues since 1989, and she consults for the World Health Organization on the treatment of HIV and MDR-TB in developing countries. Her scholarly work focuses on the human rights aspect of HIV treatment and on the implementation of complex health interventions in resource-poor settings.

== Personal life ==
Joia Mukherjee was raised in Huntington, New York. As the daughter of an Indian father and American mother, she found herself exposed to issues of global poverty and social injustice, at a young age. In 1972, at the age of eight, she traveled to India where she found herself outraged by squalid conditions of poverty. Mukherjee's passion to combat poverty and injustice continued throughout her early years and was fostered through action and academic pursuit. Having served populations of the world's poorest and witnessed first-hand the global injustices that plague so many, Mukherjee finds much needed motivation and enjoyment in singing, cooking, and spending time with loved ones.

== Education ==
Joia Mukherjee completed her undergraduate degree in 1985 in Chemistry, Cellular and Molecular Biology at the University of Michigan, Ann Arbor. In 1992, Mukherjee graduated from Medical School at the University of Minnesota, Minneapolis. She began her Residency in Internal Medicine and Pediatrics at the University of Minnesota Medical Center in Minneapolis and interrupted her residency to work on HIV prevention in rural Uganda. She completed her residency at Massachusetts General Hospital in Boston where she remained to pursue a fellowship in Infectious Disease. In 2001, Mukherjee completed a Masters of Public Health in Quantitative Methods at the Harvard School of Public Health.

== Work ==
Dr. Mukherjee holds Faculty Academic Appointments at Harvard Medical School and Brigham and Women's Hospital. She served as Chief Medical Officer of Partners In Health from 2000 to 2025 and is currently its Senior Clinical and Academic Advisor. She also holds the roles of Director of the Program in Global Medical Education and Social Medicine and the Master of Medical Sciences in Global Health Delivery Program at Harvard Medical School.

Mukherjee is the Chair of the board of directors of the Institute for Justice & Democracy in Haiti and has also served as an Executive Board Member for Physicians for Human Rights, Health Action AIDS Campaign; a consultant for the Harvard Medical School Vietnam-CDC-Harvard AIDS Partnership; and as a member of the board of directors of Village Health Works, Last Mile Health, and Project Muso. Mukherjee served on several local, national, and international committees, such as the World Health Organization Green Light Committee on the Treatment of Multidrug Resistant Tuberculosis, the Infectious Disease Society of America Committee on International Infectious Diseases, and the World Health Organization Technical Reference Group (TRG) on Pediatric HIV Care and Treatment]. In addition to holding membership in the Infectious Disease Society of America, the American Public Health Association, and the International AIDS Society, Dr. Mukherjee is a Fellow of the American Academy of Pediatrics.

Dr. Mukherjee is the author of An Introduction to Global Health Delivery, a textbook from Oxford University Press (2017).

== Awards ==
Dr. Joia Mukherjee has been honored for her work in the fields of academia, global healthcare, and community service through several important honors and awards. In 2006, Dr. Mukherjee was recognized by Heifer International as Hero of Humanity for her outstanding service. A handful of other awards include honorary degrees from the University of Rhode Island, Ripon College, Muhlenberg College, and Mount Holyoke College, the Marshall Wolf Award in Medical Education from the Brigham and Women's Hospital Division of Global Health Equity, and the Drapkin Award for Humanism in Medicine from the Mount Sinai School of Medicine.
