= Cange, Haiti =

Cange
- Village
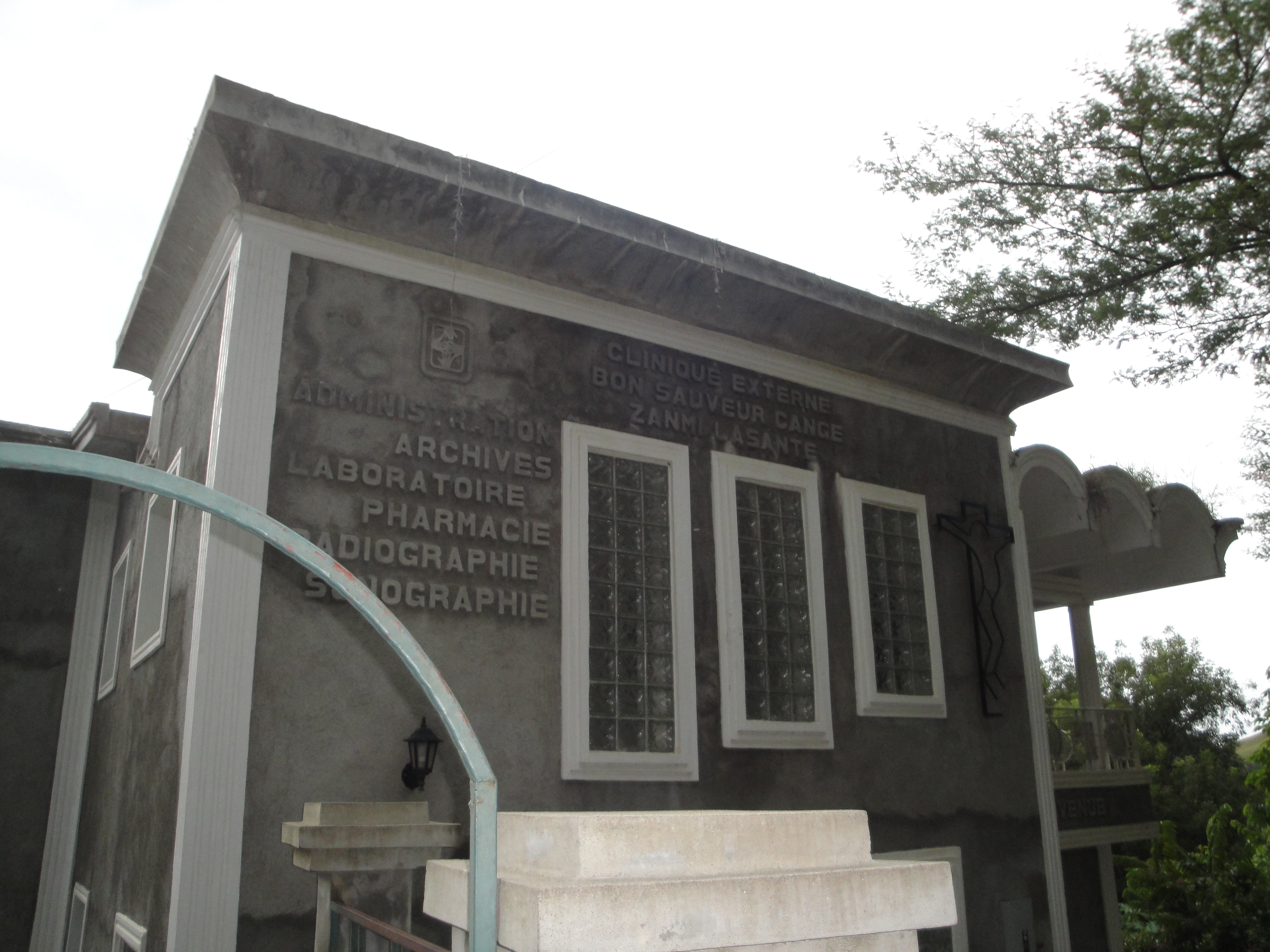

- Location in Haiti
- Coordinates: 18°56′00″N 71°59′30″W
- Country: Haiti
- Department: Centre
- Arrondissement: Mirebalais
- Elevation: 199 m (653 ft)
- Time zone: UTC-05:00 (EST)
  - Summer (DST): UTC-04:00 (EDT)

Cange is a small remote village in the Mirebalais Arrondissement, in the Centre department of Haiti. Cange is the location of an American funded hospital, Zanmi Lasante, run by Partners in Health. It is accessible by vehicle as it is located directly off Route Nationale 3. Cange sits on the edge of Lake Péligre, created by a large hydroelectric dam. Some notable residents of Cange have been and are Dr. Paul Farmer and Father Fritz Lafontant.

There is a population of 30,000 people within a radius of 7 km.

== Non-governmental organizations in Cange ==
In 1979, Father Lafontant met and formed a partnership with the Rt. Rev. William A. Beckham, sixth bishop of Upper South Carolina. Shortly thereafter a church, L'Église Bon Sauveur, was built in Cange atop dry and grassy hilltop. In 1981 the Episcopal Diocese of Upper South Carolina made their first of many medical trips to Cange. An engineering project organized by the diocese in the mid 1980s provides clean water. Later, the Clemson Engineers For Developing Countries updated the water system. Construction projects have included a medical clinic, eye clinic, dental clinic, and hospital, as well as a sewing center that provides employment for local women. Under the auspices of their diocesan "Adopt-a-Village" project, more than 15 schools have been built in the area.

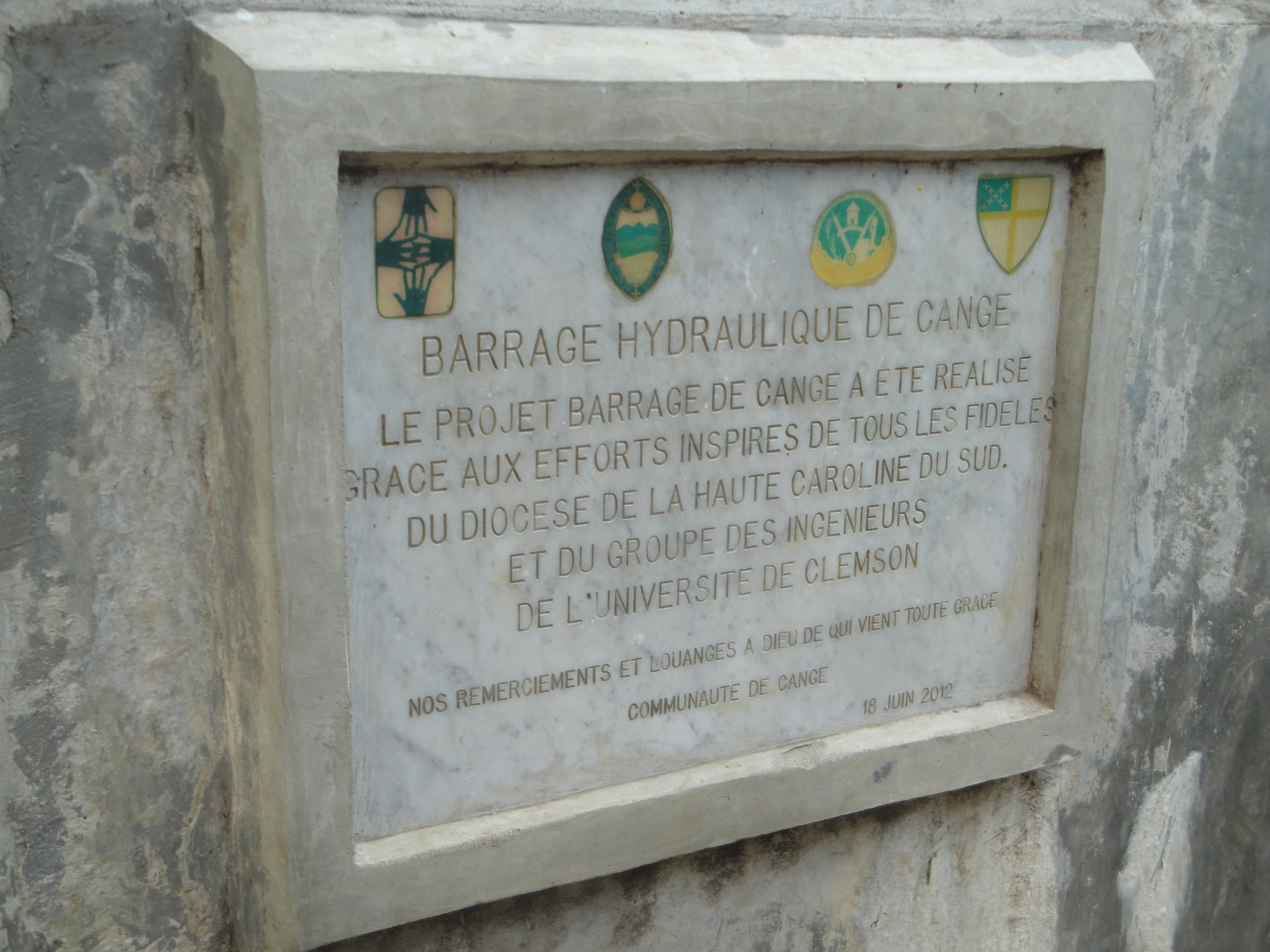
The plaque thanking those that assisted in the water project in Cange, Haiti in 2012.

In 2009, Clemson Engineers for Developing Countries partnered with Zanmi Lasante and the Episcopal Diocese of Upper South Carolina to work on the Cange Municipal Water Project. The diocese financed the $1.2 million project to renovate and expand the existing water system in Cange. Over the span of 1.5 years, the group installed nine fountains and showers, four large cisterns with a total capacity of 200,000 gallons, and a powerful turbine that can deliver 144,000 gallons of water per day. The water is pumped up 1,100 feet through nearly two miles of four-inch galvanized pipe water up a steep mountainside to Cange. The system was inaugurated in June 2012.

== The Art Center ==
Sant Art, 'art center' in Creole, was started by Jackie Williams in Cange, Haiti in the 1980s. The art center trains and employs local Haitian artists and offers their goods for sale. Goods for sale include fine needlework, exquisite note cards, designer rugs, and traditional Haitian dolls. These can be viewed and ordered online as well as bought at the center located in Cange.

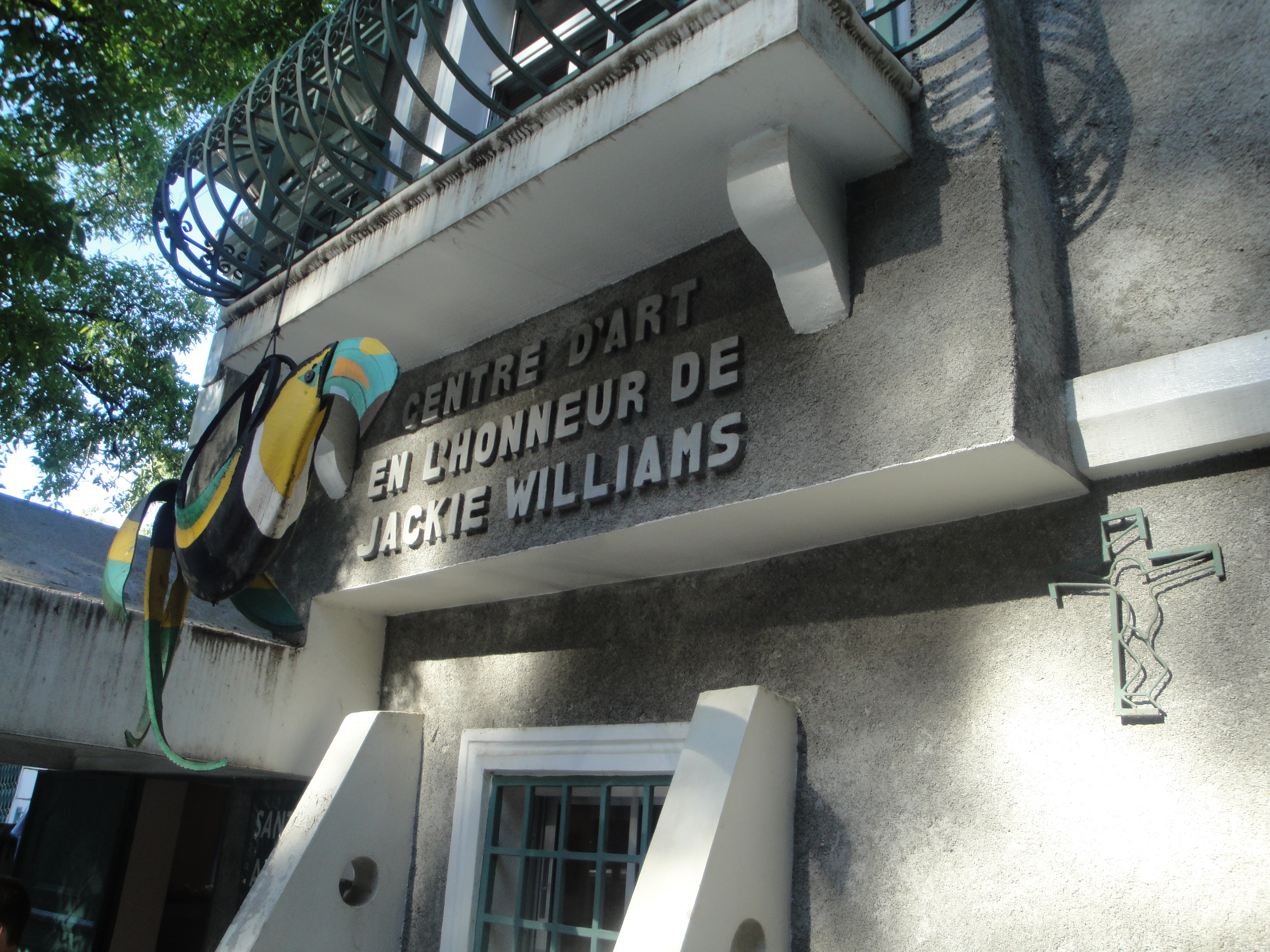
Sant Art, The Art Center in Cange, Haiti

== Important events ==
- 1956 — Cange was submerged by a dam on the Artibonite River
- 1962 — Father Fritz and Yolande Lafontant established a primary school for the children.
- 1983 — Lafontants and their colleagues are joined by Paul Farmer
- 1985 — Bon Sauveur is established
- 1986 — First case of AIDS in the Central Plateau is identified in Cange

== See also ==
- Mountains Beyond Mountains
