= Gary Gottlieb =

Gary L. Gottlieb (born May 1955), is an American psychiatrist, healthcare executive and healthcare investor who was CEO of Partners in Health from 2015 to 2019.

In the 1990s and early 2000s, Gottlieb established, chaired, or led various medical centers and departments. From 2010 to 2015, he was president and CEO of Partners HealthCare. He is the only person to appear eight consecutive times in Modern Healthcare magazine's list of the "50 Most Influential Physician Executives in Healthcare."

Gottlieb earned a BS from the Rensselaer Polytechnic Institute, an MD from the Albany Medical College of Union University, and an MBA from the Wharton School of the University of Pennsylvania. He is a professor of psychiatry at Harvard Medical School and a member of the National Academy of Medicine. Gottlieb is also an executive partner of digital health venture capital firm Flare Capital Partners in Boston, MA. He was a member of the board of directors of the Federal Reserve Bank of Boston from 2012 to 2016 and as its chair from 2016 to 2018. He is on the external advisory board of the University of Pennsylvania's Center for Health Incentives and Behavioral Economics (CHIBE).

He and his wife Derri Shtasel, a psychiatrist, have two children: a son, Corey; and a daughter, Zoe.
