= J. F. White Contracting Co. =

J.F. White Contracting Company
- Company type: Subsidiary
- Industry: Construction, Civil Engineering
- Founded: 1924; 101 years ago
- Founder: Joseph F. White Sr
- Headquarters: Framingham, Massachusetts, United States
- Parent: Dragados USA (ACS Group)
- Divisions: Heavy Civil, Marine & Foundations, Electrical, Mechanical
- Website: www.jfwhite.com

J. F. White Contracting Co. is a Massachusetts-based contracting company specializing in heavy civil construction, deep foundations, pile driving, and mechanical/electrical construction. Founded in 1924, the company is headquartered in Framingham, Massachusetts. The company has performed work primarily in the New England area of America. In 2014, J.F. White Contracting Company was acquired by Dragados USA.

== History ==
J.F. White Contracting Co. was formally founded in 1924 by Joseph F. White, Sr. who had started his business years prior to the company's formal organization. He bought his first truck in 1918 and steam shovel in 1922. From 1924 to 1930, the company excavated the foundations for the Statler Hotel & Office Building, the Aetna Headquarters, the Sears Building in Boston, the Harvard Business School, the Fogg Art Museum. The company also built the Foxboro Stadium.

In 1945, White's sons Thomas J. White, Joseph White Jr. and John White returned from World War II and took over the business. The sons focused the firm's work on pursuing public works contracts offered by the Metropolitan District Commission. The Charles River dam project was their first major heavy civil project. The successful completion of this contract in 1978 led to the establishment of J.F. White as a respected heavy civil contractor.

== Major Projects ==
The company played a key role in the Boston Big Dig project. Notable contracts during the Big Dig included the Ted Williams Tunnel (Joint venture with Morrison-Knudsen and Interbeton), the North End section of the Central Artery tunnel (CA/T) (Joint Venture with the Slattery division of Skanska USA and Tutor Perini), and the Central Artery I-90/I-93 jacked tunnel which involved ground freezing.

J.F. White was part of a joint venture with Skanska Civil USA and Ecco III Enterprises on the $1.1 Billion contract to build the Catskill-Delaware Water Ultraviolet Disinfection Facility.

The company was awarded a large contract as part of an offshore wind energy project in Massachusetts in 2024.

== Ownership and Leadership ==
In 2014, the firm was sold to ACS Group for an undisclosed amount after being operated by three generations of the White Family.
