= Hôpital Universitaire de Mirebalais =

Geography
- Location: Mirebalis, Haiti
- Coordinates: 18.8360°N 72.1168°W

History
- Founded: 2013

Links
- Website: Official website
- Lists: Hospitals in Haiti

Hôpital Universitaire de Mirebalais is a hospital in Mirebalais that was created by Partners In Health after the 2010 Haiti earthquake. It features solar power that can provide complete power on sunny days and feed power back to the grid. It is the largest solar-operated hospital in the world.

The hospital provides intensive care units for both adults and infants.

The hospital was attacked by a gang of gunmen in the early hours of 26 September 2023. There were approximately 350 patients at the hospital at this time, but no deaths or injuries were reported by the hospital. However, it ceased admitting new patients, and was looking to relocate current patients while the facility recovers.

In 2025, it has closed due to continued gang violence.
