= Foxboro Stadium =

Demolished stadium in Foxborough, MA

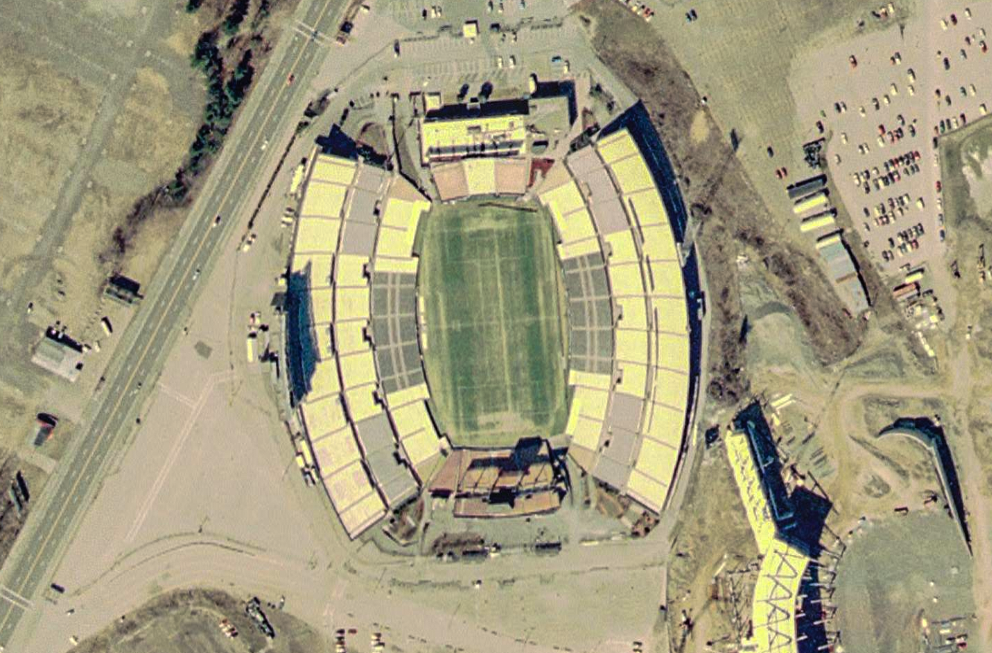
- An aerial view of Foxboro Stadium in 2002. Construction work on Gillette Stadium is visible in the lower right.
- Interactive map of Foxboro Stadium
- Former names: Schaefer Stadium (1971–1983); Sullivan Stadium (1983–1989)
- Location: Foxborough, Massachusetts
- Coordinates: 42°5′34″N 71°16′3″W
- Owner: Stadium Realty Trust (1970–1981); Stadium Management Corporation (1981–1988); Robert Kraft (1988–2002)
- Capacity: 60,292
- Surface: Grass (1991–2001); AstroTurf (1977–90); Poly-Turf (1971–76)

Construction
- Groundbreaking: September 23, 1970
- Opened: August 15, 1971
- Closed: January 19, 2002
- Demolished: Late January–June 2002
- Cost: $7.1 million ($56.4 million in 2025 dollars)
- Architects: David M. Berg Associates Inc.; Finch/Heery
- General contractor: J. F. White Contracting Co.

Tenants
- New England Patriots (NFL) (1971–2001); New England Tea Men (NASL) (1978–1980); New England Revolution (MLS) (1996–2001)

Foxboro Stadium, originally Schaefer Stadium and later Sullivan Stadium, was an outdoor stadium in the New England region of the United States, located in Foxborough, Massachusetts. It opened in 1971 and served as the home of the New England Patriots of the National Football League (NFL) for 31 seasons (through January 2002) and also as the first home venue for the New England Revolution of Major League Soccer (MLS) from 1996 to 2002. The stadium was the site of several games in both the 1994 FIFA World Cup and the 1999 FIFA Women's World Cup, and hosted a wide variety of other events, particularly concerts. Foxboro Stadium was demolished in 2002 and replaced by Gillette Stadium and the Patriot Place shopping center.

== History ==
The stadium opened in August 1971 as Schaefer Stadium, primarily as the home venue for the renamed New England Patriots of the National Football League. The team was known as the Boston Patriots for its first eleven seasons 1960–70, and had played in various stadiums in the Boston area. For six seasons, 1963–68, the Patriots played in Fenway Park, home of baseball's Boston Red Sox. Like most baseball stadiums, Fenway was poorly suited as a football venue. Its seating capacity was inadequate—only about 40,000 for football—and many seats had obstructed views. With the completion of the AFL–NFL merger in 1970, the league required its teams to play in stadiums which seated more than 50,000, and no venue in Boston proper could accommodate a crowd this size with the NFL's then-new requirements. Indeed, before the Patriots arrived, numerous previous attempts at pro football in Boston had been stymied by the lack of a pro-caliber stadium. (The Redskins left for Washington, D.C. after the 1936 season, in which they hosted the NFL Championship Game, not in Boston but at the Polo Grounds in New York City.)

The then-Boston Patriots played the 1969 season at Alumni Stadium at Boston College in Chestnut Hill, Massachusetts, and the 1970 season, their first in the NFL, at Harvard Stadium in Boston's Allston neighborhood.

The site was selected when the owners of Bay State Raceway donated the land, midway between Boston and Providence, Rhode Island. The general contractor who built the stadium was a Massachusetts-based company named J. F. White Contracting Co.

Ground was broken in September 1970, and it cost $7.1 million, only $200,000 over budget. Even allowing for this modest cost overrun, it was still a bargain price for a major sports stadium even by 1970s standards. Although the stadium was beset by problems, especially with the plumbing, which resulted in a river of toilet water flowing down the main concourse. This was because the Patriots received no funding from the governments of either the Commonwealth of Massachusetts or the town of Foxborough; indeed, it was one of the few major league stadiums of that era that was entirely privately funded.

=== Seating capacity ===
Years	Capacity
1971	61,114
1972	60,999
1973–1977	61,279
1978–1983	61,297
1984–1987	60,890
1988–1994	60,794
1995–2002	60,292

== Playing surface ==
Like the majority of outdoor sports venues built in North America in the 1970s, Foxboro Stadium was designed for the use of an artificial turf playing surface. The original field was Poly-Turf, succeeded by AstroTurf. A natural grass field was installed before the start of the 1991 season.

== Naming rights ==
The original name in 1971 was Schaefer Stadium for the brewery of that name in an early example of the sale of naming rights to a company that did not own the stadium. When this agreement expired after the 1982 season, Anheuser-Busch took over the rights. Instead of putting the name of one of its brands of beer on the stadium, Anheuser-Busch agreed to name it in honor of the Sullivan family, then the majority owners of the Patriots. The name Sullivan Stadium took effect on May 23, 1983. After Sullivan went bankrupt and Robert Kraft purchased the stadium, Kraft stripped Sullivan's name and renamed the venue "Foxboro Stadium". Although the official spelling of the town's name is "Foxborough", the shorter spelling was used for the stadium.

During the ownership of Victor Kiam, ESPN anchor Chris Berman humorously referred to the facility as "Shaver Stadium", a pun on Kiam's fame from Remington razor commercials and the stadium's original name.

== Notable events ==
=== Soccer ===
The venue hosted numerous significant soccer matches, including six games in the 1994 FIFA World Cup. Foxboro Stadium was the last stadium where Diego Maradona scored a World Cup goal in a game against Greece, and where he last played in an official FIFA World Cup match against Nigeria on June 25, 1994.

The stadium hosted five games in the 1999 FIFA Women's World Cup, the 1996 and 1999 MLS Cups, and the inaugural Women's United Soccer Association Founders Cup.

The stadium's final soccer match was the qualifying match between the United States and Jamaica, which the United States won 2-1.

1994 FIFA World Cup

Date	Time (EDT)	Team #1	Res.	Team #2	Round	Attendance
21 June 1994	12:30	Argentina	4–0	Greece	Group D	54,456
23 June 1994	19:30	South Korea	0–0	Bolivia	Group C	54,453
25 June 1994	16:00	Argentina	2–1	Nigeria	Group D	54,453
30 June 1994	19:30	Greece	0–2	Nigeria	Group D	53,001
5 July 1994	13:00	Nigeria	1–2 (a.e.t.)	Italy	Round of 16	54,367
9 July 1994	12:00	Italy	2–1	Spain	Quarter-finals	53,400

1999 FIFA Women's World Cup

Date	Time (EDT)	Team #1	Res.	Team #2	Round	Attendance
20 June 1999	16:00	Norway	2–1	Russia	Group C	14,873
20 June 1999	19:30	Australia	1–1	Ghana	Group D	14,873
27 June 1999	16:30	Mexico	0–2	Italy	Group B	50,484
27 June 1999	19:00	United States	3–0	North Korea	Group A	50,484
4 July 1999	19:30	Norway	0–5	China	Semi-finals	28,986

Major League Soccer finals

Event	Date	Champions	Res.	Runners-up	Attendance
MLS Cup '96	20 October 1996	D.C. United	3–2 (a.e.t.)	Los Angeles Galaxy	34,643
MLS Cup '99	21 November 1999	D.C. United	2–0	Los Angeles Galaxy	44,910

Women's United Soccer Association finals

Event	Date	Time (EDT)	Champions	Res.	Runners-up	Attendance
2001 WUSA Founders Cup	25 August 2001	14:00	Bay Area CyberRays	3–3 (a.e.t.) (4–2 p)	Atlanta Beat	21,078

=== College football ===
==== Holy Cross Crusaders ====
During the final week of the 1971 season, Holy Cross moved its home game against rival Boston College to the newly-constructed Schaefer Stadium, due to a heavy snowstorm that rendered Fitton Field in Worcester unplayable.

==== Boston College Eagles ====
In the opening week of the 1975 season, Boston College hosted Notre Dame at Schaefer Stadium in their first ever meeting. From 1983 through 1987, BC used Schaefer/Sullivan Stadium as an alternate home venue to host crowds larger than could be accommodated on campus at Alumni Stadium.

Date	Visiting team	Result	Home team	Attendance	Source
November 27, 1971	Boston College (rivalry)	21-7	Holy Cross	22,205	
September 15, 1975	#9 Notre Dame (Holy War)	17-3	Boston College	61,501	
October 29, 1983	Penn State	17-27	#19 Boston College	56,605	
November 19, 1983	Holy Cross (rivalry)	7-47	#18 Boston College	38,512	
November 26, 1983	#13 Alabama	13-20	#15 Boston College	58,047	
September 22, 1984	North Carolina	20-52	#10 Boston College	44,672	
November 17, 1984	Syracuse (rivalry)	16-24	#13 Boston College	60,890	
September 14, 1985	#17 Maryland	31-13	Boston College	30,210	
September 28, 1985	Miami (FL)	45-10	Boston College	31,864	
September 20, 1986	#5 Penn State	26-14	Boston College	42,329	
September 26, 1987	#15 Penn State	27-17	Boston College	50,267	
Rankings from AP Poll released prior to the game

=== Other events ===
The stadium hosted numerous other outdoor events, primarily concerts, along with music festivals, including The Monsters of Rock Festival Tour and The Vans Warped Tour, as well as the WWF King of the Ring tournament on July 8, 1985 and July 14, 1986.

U2 played on The Joshua Tree Tour on September 22, 1987, and later performed three nights of their Zoo TV Tour on August 20, 22, and 23, 1992.

Schaefer Stadium hosted Elton John on July 4, 1976, as well as Boz Scaggs, The Eagles, and Fleetwood Mac on July 25, 1976.

Sullivan Stadium hosted The Who's 25th anniversary tour on July 12 and 14, 1989.

Paul McCartney brought the Flowers In the Dirt Tour to the stadium on July 24 and 26, 1990.

New Kids on The Block brought The Magic Summer Tour to the stadium on July 29 and July 31, 1990. An audience of 53,000 people attended one of two concert dates.

Genesis brought the We Can't Dance Tour to the stadium on May 28, 1992.

Metallica and Guns N' Roses brought the Guns N' Roses/Metallica Stadium Tour to the stadium on September 11, 1992, with Faith No More as their opening act.

Elton John performed at the venue in front of 62,000 on US Bicentennial on July 4, 1976. John again appeared in a Face to Face concert with Billy Joel on July 18, 1994.

Madonna performed her "Who's That Girl" tour there on July 9, 1987, to a sell-out crowd.

Bob Dylan and the Grateful Dead recorded a portion of their collaborative live album, entitled Dylan & the Dead, there on July 4, 1987.

Pink Floyd played a two-night stand in May 1988 (on one of the nights their inflatable pig was torn to shreds). They also played a three-night sold-out stand in May 1994 on their The Division Bell Tour which was recorded and readily available on bootleg. (The second night was filmed by MTV for promotional purposes.)

The Dave Matthews Band played seven shows at the stadium from 1998 to 2001.

The Rolling Stones played three nights on September 27 and 29 and October 1, 1989, then two more nights on September 4 and 5, 1994 and lastly October 20 and 21, 1997.

George Strait played on May 16, 1999.

Additionally, in 1994, the Drum Corps International World Championships were held in the stadium.

== Closing ==
By the late 1990s, Foxboro Stadium had become functionally obsolete by modern NFL standards. Despite excellent sight lines to view game action or concerts and having fewer of the issues that multi-sport multi-purpose stadiums in other cities had, the stadium was otherwise outmoded. The facility was built in a low-cost "bare bones" manner with unexceptional architectural elements, and had very few modern amenities. The stadium's plumbing was not designed with NFL-sized crowds in mind, which became evident when a sewage issue overflowed the restroom facilities during its first game. Stadium officials were forced to augment the permanent toilets with rented portable toilets for the rest of the stadium's existence. It also lacked luxury boxes, an increasingly important source of revenue for other teams in the league. Only a small fraction of the seats had permanent chairbacks (painted blue, red and white near the 50-yard line). Most patrons had to sit on backless aluminum benches (or like still done in the lower Lambeau Field bowl today, rent or bring in their own stadium cushions and portable chairbacks) that often froze late in the season. During heavy rains, the numerous unpaved spots in the parking lot turned to mud. It frequently took an hour or more to leave after games, due to its location on a then-undivided four-lane portion of U.S. Route 1. In order to host the FIFA World Cup (and later, the New England Revolution), several rows of seats were removed to accommodate a soccer pitch with acceptable dimensions to FIFA.

With a capacity of just over 60,000 (only 10,000 above the NFL's minimum seating capacity), it was one of the smallest stadiums in the NFL. It was also almost completely exposed to the elements, meaning there was almost no protection for the fans in storms (outside of beneath the stands) or in extreme cold. Additionally, the Sullivan family had lost millions promoting the Jackson Victory Tour in 1984. Due to their relatively modest wealth compared to other NFL owners, they pledged the stadium as collateral for the tour. Knowing the revenue from the Patriots would not be nearly enough to service the debt, the Sullivans quietly put the team and the stadium on the market.

The Sullivans' financial picture was so dire that even when the Patriots made Super Bowl XX, the team failed to bring in nearly enough money to service the debt from the Victory Tour. With most of their money tied up in the team, they sold controlling interest in the Patriots to Victor Kiam in 1989. The stadium, however, lapsed into bankruptcy and was bought by Boston paper magnate Robert Kraft in 1988.

When Kiam and Sullivan tried to sell the team to interests in Jacksonville, Kraft effectively stymied the deal by refusing to let the team out of their lease, which contained an ironclad commitment to play in the stadium until 2001. As a result, when Kiam himself was crippled by financial troubles, he sold the Patriots to James Orthwein in 1992. After only two years, Orthwein tried to move the Patriots to his hometown of St. Louis. However, as in 1992, Kraft refused to let the Patriots out of their lease. Orthwein then put the team on the market, but the wording of the operating covenant required any potential buyer to negotiate lease terms with Kraft. With this in mind, Kraft swooped in and bought the team himself. Two years later, Kraft bought the parcel of land containing neighboring Bay State Raceway, allowing him to build a new and privately-financed stadium on the raceway property after proposals to build a new stadium in Hartford, Connecticut and South Boston failed.

After 31 NFL seasons, Foxboro Stadium was scheduled to be demolished on December 23, 2001, the day after the Patriots' final home game. However, the stadium would instead play host to the first season of the Tom Brady and Bill Belichick era, with the team making a run to get into the playoffs and going on to win their first Super Bowl. As a result, the stadium was not demolished until late January 2002, after the conclusion of the 2001 postseason. The last game played in the stadium, the "Tuck Rule Game", was played in a snow storm; it resulted in a Patriots win against the Oakland Raiders, which famously featured an overturned fumble call based on the then-applicable tuck rule in the final minutes. The stadium's former site became parking lots for its successor, Gillette Stadium, before being developed into the open-air shopping center Patriot Place.

Preceded by Harvard Stadium	Home of the New England Patriots; 1971–2002	Succeeded by Gillette Stadium
Preceded by first stadium	Home of the New England Revolution; 1996–2001	Succeeded by Gillette Stadium
Preceded by First; Rose Bowl	Host of the MLS Cup; 1996; 1999	Succeeded by RFK Stadium; RFK Stadium
Preceded by Mississippi Veterans Memorial Stadium	Host of the Drum Corps International; World Championship; 1994	Succeeded by Rich Stadium
Preceded by Three Rivers Stadium	Host of AFC Championship Game; 1997	Succeeded by Three Rivers Stadium
