= Paul Farmer =

American medical anthropologist and physician (1959–2022)

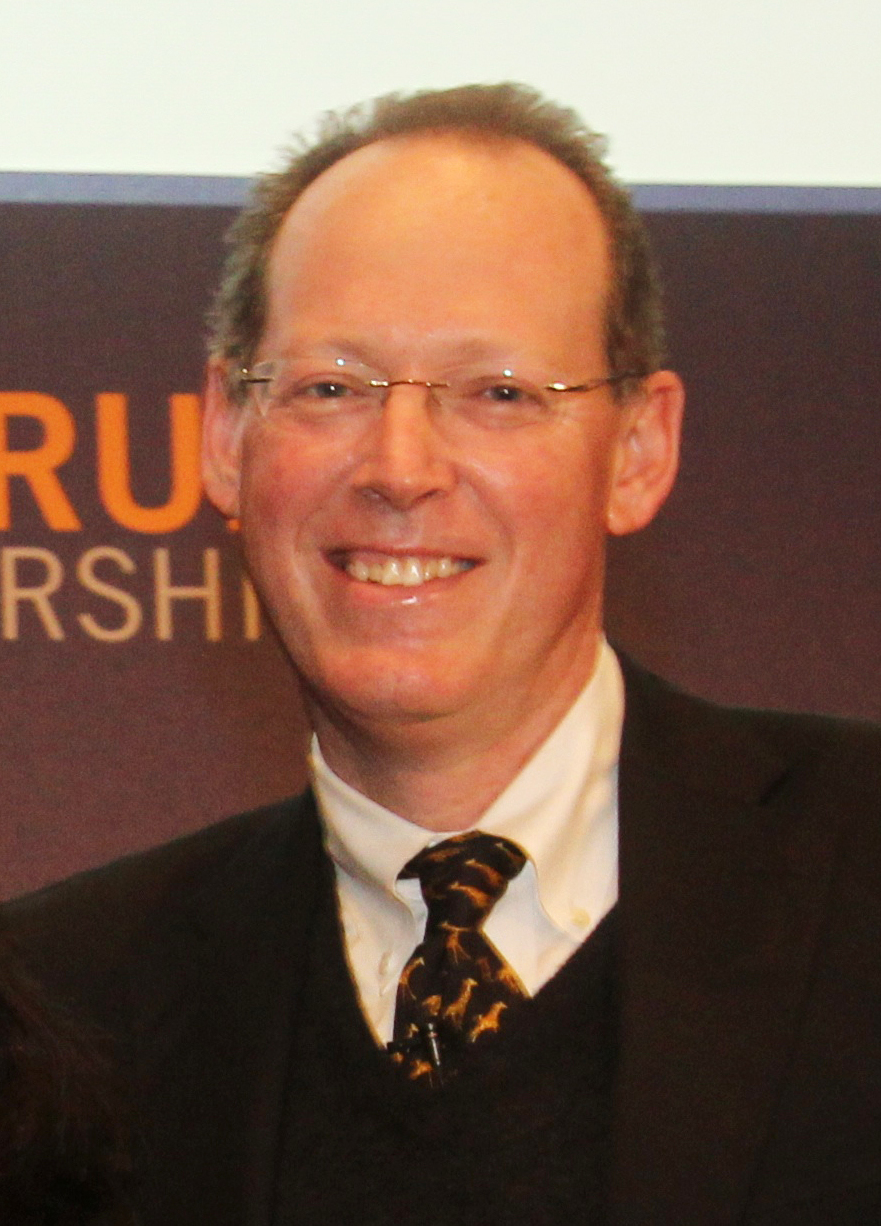
- Farmer in 2011
- Born: Paul Edward Farmer; October 26, 1959; North Adams, Massachusetts, U.S.
- Died: February 21, 2022 (aged 62); Butaro, Rwanda
- Education: Duke University (BA); Harvard University (MD, PhD)
- Spouse: Didi Bertrand (m. 1996)
- Children: 3
- Awards: MacArthur Fellowship (1993); Conrad N. Hilton Humanitarian Prize (2005); Heinz Award in the Human Condition (2003); Public Welfare Medal (2018); Berggruen Prize (2020)
- Scientific career
- Fields: Internal medicine; Infectious disease; Medical anthropology
- Workplaces: Harvard University

Paul Edward Farmer (October 26, 1959 – February 21, 2022) was an American medical anthropologist and physician. Farmer held an MD and PhD from Harvard University, where he was a University Professor and the chair of the Department of Global Health and Social Medicine at Harvard Medical School. He was the co-founder and chief strategist of Partners In Health (PIH), an international non-profit organization that since 1987 has provided direct health care services and undertaken research and advocacy activities on behalf of those who are sick and living in poverty. He was professor of medicine and chief of the Division of Global Health Equity at Brigham and Women's Hospital.

Farmer and his colleagues in the U.S. and abroad pioneered novel community-based treatment strategies that demonstrate the delivery of high-quality health care in resource-poor settings in the U.S. and abroad. Their work is documented in the Bulletin of the World Health Organization, The Lancet, The New England Journal of Medicine, Clinical Infectious Diseases, the British Medical Journal and Social Science and Medicine.

Farmer wrote extensively on Health and Human Rights, the role of social inequalities in the distribution and outcome of infectious diseases, and global health. Farmer pioneered the concept of community health works and decentralized models of care.

He was known as "the man who would cure the world", as described in Tracy Kidder's Mountains Beyond Mountains (2003). Farmer and Partners in Health received the Peace Abbey Foundation Courage of Conscience Award in 2007 for saving lives by providing free health care to people in the world's poorest communities and working to improve health care systems globally. The story of PIH is told in Bending the Arc (2017). He was a proponent of liberation theology.

On April 24, 2021, Farmer was named Aurora Humanitarian in recognition of his work with PIH. He died of a heart attack in 2022. Following his death, the Paul E. Farmer Maternal Center of Excellence in Koidu, Sierra Leone was named in his honor.

== Early life and education ==
Farmer was born in North Adams, Massachusetts, and raised in Weeki Wachee, Florida. He had first lived in Alabama for some of his childhood years. Then when his family moved to Florida, Farmer and his family of eight lived in an old school bus that his father had transformed into a mobile home. Farmer recounted his father as a "free spirit," as he later on pursued commercial fishing and took his family to live with him on a houseboat in the Gulf of Mexico. Farmer's father then anchored the houseboat in a primitive bayou called Jenkins Creek where the family bathed, bringing jugs with drinking water from Brooksville. Farmer prioritized his education and excelled academically in school. Farmer's parents often read serious literature to their children, motivating them to learn as much as possible in regard to all that the world had to offer. The family dealt with financial difficulties that often led them to work in different environments. One summer, Farmer's family worked with Haitian migrant workers and picked citrus fruit, which was Farmer's first encounter of many with Haitian people.

He was the brother of former professional wrestler Jeff Farmer. He was a graduate of Hernando High School in Brooksville, Florida, where he was elected president of his senior class. He attended Duke University as a Benjamin N. Duke Scholar, graduating summa cum laude with a Bachelor of Arts in medical anthropology in 1982. During his time at Duke, he went to Paris for half a year and learned French fluently which benefited him in his future work. He then came across the work of Rudolf Virchow, the 19th century German physician and scientist that developed public health medicine, who inspired Farmer's career trajectory. Farmer's passions were further shaped by the political atmosphere around him at the time with civil war and revolution breaking out in Central America (including the Nicaraguan Revolution, Salvadoran Civil War, and Guatemalan Civil War), and the rise of liberation theology which the Catholic clergy used to defy authoritarianism in the region. This ideology emphasized the "preferential option for the poor," which consisted of the physical and spiritual wellbeing of the poor as a crucial component of the word of God. To some followers of Christianity, part of "liberation theology" that Christians need to focus on as their primary obligation involves helping the least fortunate of those around them.

Farmer later became involved with migrant labor camps near campus, and came into contact with Sister Juliana DeWolf. She was working with the United Farm Workers, seeking to ameliorate the living circumstances of the laborers harvesting tobacco. Through this encounter, Farmer befriended many of the Haitian farm workers, and listened to their life experiences and stories. He became interested in Haiti and began learning Creole, interviewing Haitian migrant workers, and reading about Haiti's history.

After graduating from Duke, Farmer began volunteering at a hospital in Cange in the Central Plateau of Haiti. Subsequently, he attended Harvard University, earning an MD and a PhD in medical anthropology in 1990, returning to Haiti multiple times during medical school to continue his work in Cange. He completed an internal medicine residency at Brigham and Women's Hospital in 1993 and an infectious disease fellowship in 1996. Farmer was board certified in internal medicine and infectious disease.

== International work ==
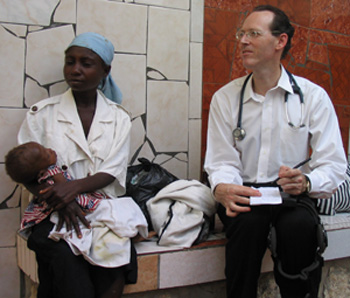
Farmer (right), 2013

In 1987, Farmer, along with Jim Yong Kim, Ophelia Dahl, Thomas J. White, and Todd McCormack, co-founded Partners In Health. PIH began in Cange in the Central Plateau of Haiti and at the time of Farmer's death in February 2022 operated 16 sites across the country, with approximately 7,000 employees. PIH in Cange was known as Zanmi Lasante, the sister organization of PIH. Zanmi Lasante built schools, homes, and communal sanitation and water systems to help the community in central Haiti have improved facilities and resources. The organization vaccinated all of the local children while successfully decreasing malnutrition and infant mortality rates in the area. Zanmi Lasante also focused on AIDS prevention during the HIV crisis and successfully decreased HIV transmission rates to 4% from mothers to babies.

In 1999, the World Health Organization designated Farmer and a fellow PIH worker Jim Yong Kim to facilitate global multi-drug resistant tuberculosis (MDR TB) treatment programs, ensuring successful deliveries of antibiotics. With the help of a $44.7 million grant from the Bill & Melinda Gates Foundation, Farmer created specific drug-therapy initiatives for individuals in Haiti, Peru, and Russia. With this program having some of the highest cure rates in the world, it was clear that treating MDR TB could be done cost effectively in poor countries with functional delivery systems.

Hôpital Universitaire de Mirebalais opened in 2013 and provides tertiary care to patients, including oncology and trauma surgery services. Partners In Health also works in Rwanda, Lesotho, Malawi, Mexico, Peru, Sierra Leone, Liberia, Russia, and the Navajo Nation. The University of Global Health Equity is an initiative of Partners In Health that started in 2015 and focused on delivering the highest quality of health care by addressing the critical social and systemic forces causing inequities and inefficiencies in health care delivery.

In 2003, author Tracy Kidder's Mountains Beyond Mountains: The Quest of Dr. Paul Farmer, a Man Who Would Cure the World was published. The book describes Farmer's work in Haiti, Peru, and Russia.

In May 2009, Farmer was named Chair of Harvard Medical School's Department of Global Health and Social Medicine, succeeding Jim Yong Kim, his longtime friend and colleague. On December 17, 2010, Harvard University's president, Drew Gilpin Faust, and the President and Fellows of Harvard College, named Farmer as a University Professor, the highest honor that the university can bestow on one of its faculty members.

In August 2009, Farmer was named United Nations Deputy Special Envoy to Haiti (serving under former U.S. President Bill Clinton in his capacity as Special Envoy).

In December 2012, Farmer was appointed the United Nations Special Adviser to the Secretary-General on Community Based Medicine and Lessons from Haiti.

In 2020 during the COVID-19 pandemic, Farmer worked with PIH to develop a contact-tracing program in Massachusetts.

Farmer was editor-in-chief of Health and Human Rights. He was on the board of the Aristide Foundation for Democracy and was a co-founder and board member of the Institute for Justice & Democracy in Haiti. He was on the Board of PIVOT, a recently formed healthcare and research organization operating in Madagascar. He was a member of the advisory board of Incentives for Global Health, the NGO focused on developing the Health Impact Fund. He also served on the Global Advisory Council of GlobeMed, a student-driven global health organization that works through a partnership model.

Farmer served on the advisory board of Universities Allied for Essential Medicines, an international student-driven advocacy organization that works on issues of medicine development and affordability. Farmer was a board member of Kageno Worldwide, Inc., a community development agency that has worked in Kenya and Rwanda. He was on the board of trustees for EqualHealth, which builds critical consciousness towards health equity.

He also served as Chief of the Division of Global Health Equity at Brigham and Womens Hospital and was a leader in global health education.

== Personal life and death ==
Farmer was married to Didi Bertrand Farmer, a Haitian medical anthropologist and community health specialist who has led several initiatives at Partners in Health. Her most recent work focuses on empowering girls and young women in Haiti and Rwanda. They had three children. Farmer was Catholic and he wrote with Peruvian liberation theologian Gustavo Gutierrez, whose emphasis on "the preferential option for the poor" inspired PIH's mission statement of providing "a preferential option for the poor in healthcare."

Farmer died in his sleep from an acute cardiac event in Butaro, Rwanda, on February 21, 2022, at the age of 62. Farmer had been involved in medical education at Butaro District Hospital and the Butaro campus of the University of Global Health Equity, which accepted its first class of medical students in 2019.

== Awards, recognition, and legacy ==
Farmer was the recipient of numerous honors, including the Bronislaw Malinowski Award and the Margaret Mead Award from the Society for Applied Anthropology, the Outstanding International Physician (Nathan Davis) Award from the American Medical Association, a John D. and Catherine T. MacArthur Foundation Fellowship, and, with his Partners In Health colleagues, the Hilton Humanitarian Prize. He was a member of the American Academy of Arts and Sciences and the Institute of Medicine of the National Academy of Sciences, from which he was awarded the 2018 Public Welfare Medal. In 2020, he was awarded the million-dollar Berggruen Prize.

Farmer is the posthumous namesake for the Paul E. Farmer Maternal Center of Excellence, a maternity hospital in Koidu, Sierra Leone containing the nation's first neonatal intensive care unit. Partners in Health contributed to the hospital's construction. It opened to patients in 2026.

=== List of Awards ===
- 1993: MacArthur Fellowship
- 1999: Margaret Mead Award, American Anthropological Association and Society for Applied Anthropology, for "Infections and Inequalities"
- 2002: Outstanding International Physician Award (Nathan Davis Award), American Medical Association
- 2005: Conrad N. Hilton Humanitarian Prize (awarded to Partners In Health)
- 2005: Rudolf Virchow Award, Professional Prize (with Dr. Arachu Castro), Society for Medical Anthropology
- 2006: Union Medal, Union Theological Seminary
- 2006: Mendel Medal, Villanova University
- 2006: Honorary Doctor of Laws, Princeton University
- 2007: Honorary Doctor of Science, Emory University
- 2007: The Peace Abbey Foundation Courage of Conscience Award
- 2009: Recipient of the Golden Plate Award of the American Academy of Achievement presented by Awards Council member Archbishop Desmond Tutu at an awards ceremony at St. Georges Cathedral in Cape Town, South Africa
- 2009: Honorary Doctor of Letters, Columbia University
- 2010: Honorary Doctor of Science, University of Pennsylvania
- 2010: S. Roger Horchow Award for Greatest Public Service by a Private Citizen, an award given out annually by Jefferson Awards
- 2011: named by Foreign Policy magazine to its list of top global thinkers
- 2011: Honorary Doctor of Humane Letters, University of South Florida
- 2011: Doctor of Humane Letters, Honoris Causa, Georgetown University
- 2012: Honorary Doctor of Science, Northwestern University
- 2013: Honorary Doctor of Science, American University
- 2013: Sword of Loyola, Loyola University Chicago Stritch School of Medicine
- 2015: Blessed are the Peacemakers Award, Catholic Theological Union
- 2015: Forbes 400 Lifetime Achievement Award For Social Entrepreneurship
- 2016: Bronislaw Malinowski Award, Society for Applied Anthropology
- 2018: Public Welfare Medal, National Academy of Sciences
- 2018: Elected to the American Philosophical Society
- 2019: Honorary Doctor of Laws, McGill University
- 2019: Gold Medal for Distinguished Service to Humanity, The National Institute of Social Sciences
- 2019: Rwanda National Order of Outstanding Friendship (Igihango), by the President of Rwanda His Excellency Paul Kagame
- 2020: Recipient of the million dollar Berggruen Prize for Philosophy and Culture
- 2021: Aurora Humanitarian, in recognition of his work with PIH
- 2022: Inamori Ethics Prize
- 2022 (posthumous) WHO Director-General's Global Health Leaders Award

== Books ==
- Fevers, Feuds, and Diamonds: Ebola and the Ravages of History. Paul Farmer. New York: Farrar, Straus and Giroux, 2020. ISBN 978-0-374-23432-4 Farmer first visited the Western African Ebola virus epidemic site in July 2014, and much of the book is devoted to his personal experiences. Reviewing the outbreak in 2020, he noted that there were almost no Ebola deaths in the U.S. or Europe. By Farmer's account, the West Africa Ebola death toll arose from the longstanding failure to invest in basic health infrastructure which resulted in a lack of proper medical care. Looking at the history of West Africa, Farmer blames the almost five centuries of European rule that resulted in the "rapacious extraction—of rubber latex, timber, minerals, gold, diamonds and human chattel" for the country's inability to provide adequate health care.
- AIDS and Accusation: Haiti and the Geography of Blame, Berkeley: University of California Press, 1992, 1993, 2006 edition: ISBN 978-0-520-08343-1
- The Uses of Haiti, Monroe, Maine: Common Courage Press, 1994, 2003, 2005 edition: ISBN 978-1-56751-242-7
- Infections and Inequalities: The Modern Plagues, Berkeley: University of California Press, 1999, revised 2001 edition: ISBN 978-0-520-22913-6
- Pathologies of Power: Health, Human Rights, and the New War on the Poor, Berkeley: University of California Press, 2003, 2005 edition: ISBN 978-0-520-24326-2
- Global Health in Times of Violence, co-edited with Barbara Rylko-Bauer and Linda Whiteford, School for Advanced Research Press, 2009 edition: ISBN 978-1-934691-14-4
- Women, Poverty & AIDS: Sex, Drugs and Structural Violence (Series in Health and Social Justice), with coauthor Margaret Connors, Common Courage Press; Reprint edition (September 1996), ISBN 978-1-56751-074-4
- Partner to the Poor: A Paul Farmer Reader. Ed. Haun Saussy. Berkeley: University of California Press, 2010, ISBN 978-0-520-25713-9
- Haiti After the Earthquake, Ed. Abbey Gardner and Cassia van der Hoof Holstein. PublicAffairs, July 12, 2011, ISBN 978-1-58648-973-1
- To Repair the World: Paul Farmer Speaks to the Next Generation. Ed. Jonathan Weigel. Berkeley: University of California Press, 2013. ISBN 978-0-520-27597-3
- In the Company of the Poor: conversations between Dr. Paul Farmer and Fr. Gustavo Gutierrez. Ed. Michael Griffin and Jennie Weiss Block. Orbis Books, 2013: ISBN 978-1-62698-050-1
- Reimagining Global Health. Paul Farmer, Jim Yong Kim, Arthur Kleinman, and Matthew Basilico. Berkeley: University of California Press, 2013. ISBN 978-0-520-27199-9
