= Partners In Health =

Non-profit health care organization

- Founded: 1987
- Founders: Paul Farmer; Jim Yong Kim; Ophelia Dahl, Thomas J. White; Todd McCormack
- Purpose: Humanitarian
- Location: Boston, Massachusetts
- Region served: Worldwide
- Key people: Sheila Davis, CEO
- Employees: 18,000
- Website: www.pih.org

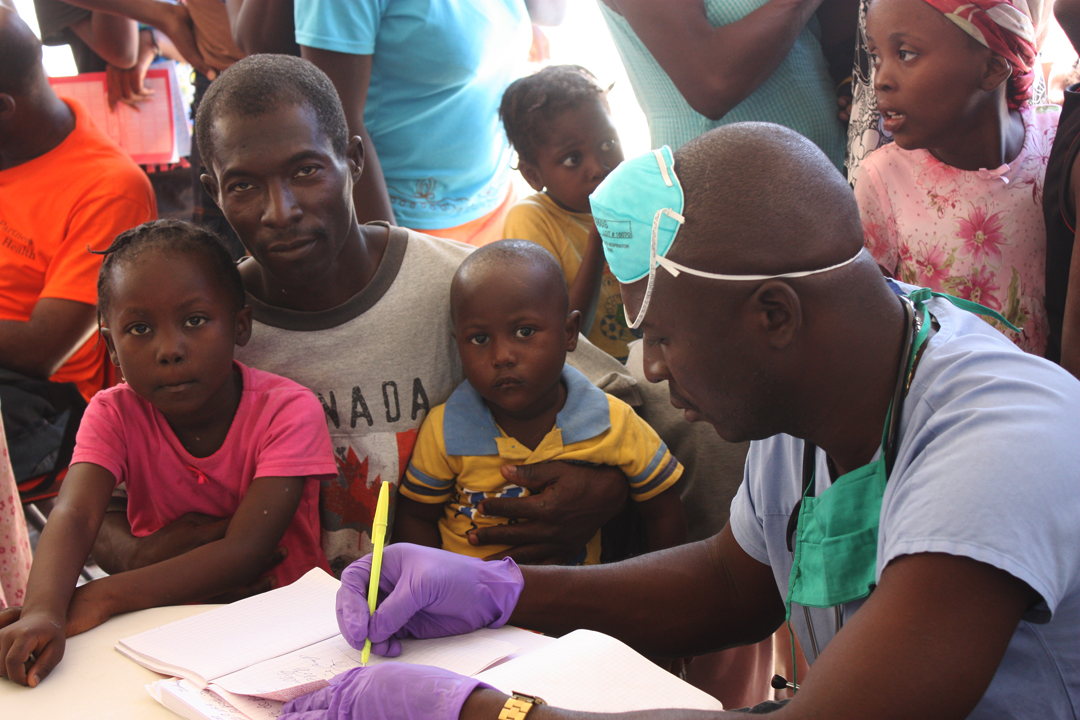
A family receives medical attention at one of PIH's Port-au-Prince-based clinics after the 2010 earthquake.

Partners In Health (PIH) is an international nonprofit public health organization founded in 1987 by Paul Farmer, Ophelia Dahl, Thomas J. White, Todd McCormack, and Jim Yong Kim.

Partners in Health provides healthcare in the poorest areas of developing countries. The organization builds hospitals and other medical facilities, hires and trains local staff, and delivers a range of healthcare, from in-home consultations to cancer treatments. It also removes barriers to maintaining good health, such as dirty water or a lack of food. The approach trades charity for "accompaniment" which is described as a "dogged commitment to doing whatever it takes to give the poor a fair shake." While many of its principles are rooted in liberation theology, the organization is secular. It forms long-term partnerships with and works on behalf of local ministries of health. PIH holds a 4 out of 4 stars rating from Charity Navigator, a nonprofit evaluator.

== History ==
Partners In Health began in 1987, after Paul Farmer and Ophelia Dahl helped set up a community-based health project called Zanmi Lasante ("Partners in Health" in Haitian Creole) in Cange, Haiti. The organization initially focused on treating people with HIV/AIDS in rural Haiti. PIH now embraces a holistic approach to tackling disease, poverty, and human rights in a variety of countries.

In 1993, Farmer used the proceeds from his John D. and Catherine T. MacArthur Award to create a new arm of Partners In Health, the Institute for Health and Social Justice. Its mission is to analyze the impact of poverty and inequality on health, and to use findings to educate academics, donors, policy makers, and the general public. PIH's Chief Medical Officer, Dr. Joia Mukherjee, directs the institute.

== Current work ==
Partners in Health currently has 18,000 staff members globally and has sites in Haiti, Kazakhstan, Lesotho, Liberia, Malawi, Mexico, Peru, Rwanda, Sierra Leone, and the United States.

PIH collaborates closely with Harvard Medical School and the Brigham and Women's Hospital.

At the invitation of local governments, it strengthens and sustains public health systems in remote, rural areas. It trains and hires local healthcare workers, many of whom actively find patients in their communities and help them get care. PIH also helps local experts conduct academic research that leads to clinical innovation.

Notable supporters include Hank and John Green, Madonna, actor Meryl Streep, Ryan Lewis, Win Butler and Régine Chassagne of Arcade Fire, and Matt Damon.

== Haiti ==
Zanmi Lasante is PIH's flagship project. The small clinic that started treating patients in the village of Cange in 1985 has grown into the Zanmi Lasante (ZL) Sociomedical Complex, a 104-bed hospital with two operating rooms, adult and pediatric inpatient wards, an infectious disease center (the Thomas J. White Center), an outpatient clinic, a women's health clinic (Proje Sante Fanm), ophthalmology and general medicine clinics, a laboratory, a pharmaceutical warehouse, a Red Cross blood bank, radiographic services, and a dozen schools.

The organization also works in 11 other sites across Haiti's Central Plateau and beyond. Zanmi Lasante is Haiti's largest nongovernmental healthcare provider, serving 4.5 million. It employs 5,700 Haitians, including doctors, nurses, and community health workers.

=== Community-based models ===
PIH's community-based model has proved successful in delivering effective care both for common conditions like diarrhea, pneumonia, and childbirth that are often fatal for Haiti's poor and malnourished, and for complex diseases like HIV and tuberculosis. The main key to this success and to the PIH model of care pioneered in Haiti has been training and hiring thousands of accompagnateurs (community health workers). The PIH model of accompagnateur care is outlined in the 5-SPICE framework, a scholarly article detailing the tenets of a successful community health worker program.

The use of accompagnateurs is one of the most effective ways of removing structural barriers to adequate treatment of HIV and other chronic diseases while increasing job growth in communities that desperately require employment to further benefit the community's social structure. Focusing on minimizing the implications of structural violence is the key to the PIH model's success and to the improvement of treatment of chronic disease in rural Haiti.

=== Expansion in Haiti ===
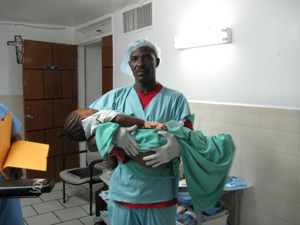
After the earthquake in Haiti, PIH sent hundreds of volunteers to the island nation and mobilized an existing staff of nearly 5,000 Haitians.

As ZL has expanded, it has partnered with other nongovernmental organizations and the Haitian Ministry of Health to rebuild or refurbish existing clinics and hospitals, introduce essential drugs to the formulary, establish laboratories, train and pay community health workers, and complement Ministry of Health personnel with PIH-trained staff. Clinics that previously stood empty now register hundreds of patients each day at twelve sites—Cange, Boucan Carré, Hinche, Thomonde, Belladère, Lascahobas, Mirebalais, and Cerca La Source in the Central Plateau plus additions in the Artibonite region: Petite Rivière, Saint-Marc and Verrettes. In 2008, ZL recorded more than 2.6 million patient visits at clinical sites.

=== Response to the Haiti earthquake ===
When an earthquake struck Haiti on January 12, 2010, PIH/ZL resources were in place to deliver aid. In addition to providing care to the hundreds of thousands who fled to Haiti's Central Plateau and Artibonite regions, ZL established health outposts at four camps for internally displaced people in Port-au-Prince. ZL also supported the city's General Hospital (HUEH) by facilitating the placement of volunteer surgeons, physicians and nurses, and by aiding the hospital's Haitian leadership.

The earthquake leveled most of the health facilities in and around Port-au-Prince, including Haiti's only public teaching hospital and nursing school. In March 2010, PIH/ZL responded to an urgent appeal from the Haitian Ministry of Public Health and Population (MSPP) by announcing the Stand With Haiti campaign, a 3-year, $125 million plan to help Haiti rebuild. The plan included a scaled-up version of an already planned hospital, the Mirebalais Hospital.

=== Hôpital Universitaire de Mirebalais ===
Before January 12, 2010, PIH had been planning to build a new community hospital in Mirebalais. Less than six months after the earthquake, the organization quickly scaled up plans.

In October 2012, Partners in Health finished construction on the Hôpital Universitaire de Mirebalais in Haiti. The hospital provides primary-care services to about 185,000 people in Mirebalais and two nearby communities. It is also intended to serve most of the country for secondary and tertiary care. The hospital opened its doors in March 2013.

The hospital provides education for Haitian nurses, medical students, and resident physicians. It has telemedicine technologies installed in meeting and operating rooms that link US-based medical professionals to help educate and train students and residents working there. Also, Partners in Health helped to establish an emergency department in the hospital. The organization has incorporated community health workers into their treatment regimen for their patients. Community health workers make necessary house visits to patients, deliver stipends and other essentials for patients' care, and keep record of their patients' progress at the hospital.

== Other locations ==
=== Perú ===
Since 1996, PIH's sister organization in Peru, Socios En Salud (SES), has been providing medical services in Lima. Based in the northern Lima district of Carabayllo, SES is now Peru's largest non-governmental health care organization, serving an estimated population of 700,000 inhabitants, many of whom have fled from poverty and political violence in Peru's countryside. As a valued partner to Peru's Ministry of Health, SES has also influenced national policies for prevention and treatment of multidrug-resistant tuberculosis and HIV and provides important training and support to help implement those policies nationwide.

SES also provides a variety of services. SES provides food baskets, transportation, lodging and other forms of support for impoverished patients. The project also provides opportunities for income generation projects, job skills training, and small business loans. One example is Mujeres Unidas ("Women United"), a cooperative workshop that participates in crafts fairs in Peru and has sold handicrafts as far as the United States, Japan and Switzerland.

PIH is also affiliated with the non-profit called Advance Access & Delivery in Lima.

==== Tuberculosis treatment ====
SES has treated more than 10,500 people for multidrug-resistant tuberculosis (MDR-TB) in Lima. SES is conducting the world's largest TB research study, the EPI Project. Funded by a National Institutes of Health grant of US$6 million in 2007, the project seeks to understand how MDR-TB and XDR-TB spreads among people living in close quarters.

=== Mexico ===
Partners In Health, known locally as Compañeros En Salud, began working in Chiapas, Mexico in 2011. The residents of this southern Mexican state, including indigenous populations, have long struggled with poverty, political violence, and inadequate healthcare access. Chiapas has higher tuberculosis incidence and mortality rates than the country's. CES aims to provide a more reliable, community-based alternative by training and employing local community health promoters, called promotores.

El Equipo de Apoyo en Salud y Educación Comunitaria (EAPSEC, The Team for the Support of Community Health and Education) was established in 1985 by a small group of Mexican health promoters. They initially worked with Guatemalan refugee communities in the Chiapas border region, and later expanded their work to other marginalized people in Chiapas. EAPSEC believes that "a life of dignity" is a human right. This includes a strong public health system that responds to the most pressing health needs of the population, and access to high quality health care.

Since 1989, PIH has collaborated with EAPSEC to improve medical infrastructure in the region and to recruit and train hundreds of promotores. Over the past two decades, EAPSEC has partnered with dozens of indigenous and rural communities throughout Chiapas to develop local health capacity. Recent work has focused on a network of communities in the area of Huitiupan in the highlands and around Amatan. EAPSEC is dedicated to helping communities build self-sufficiency and counts many successful community health groups throughout Chiapas among its "alumni."

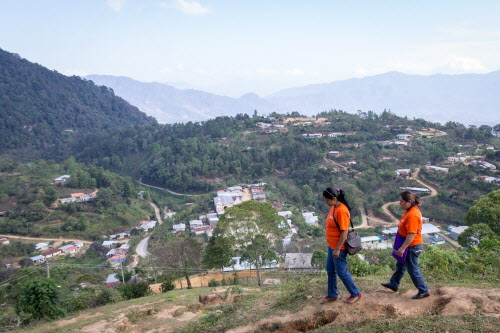
Community Health Workers, Yadira Roblero and Magdalena Gutiérrez, walk down the mountain side to complete their home visits in Laguna Del Cofre, Chiapas, Mexico, on March 11, 2016.

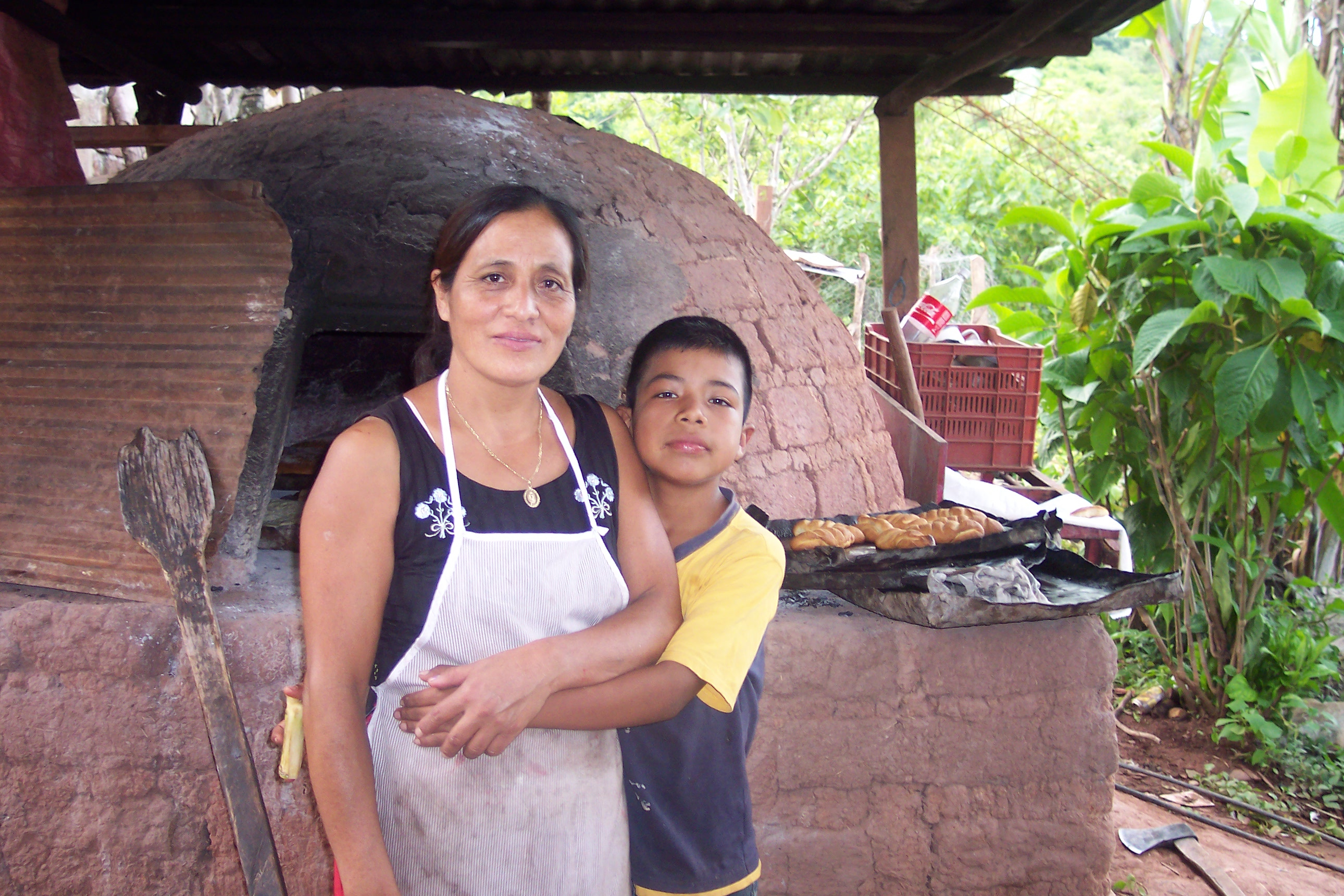
Many of the women took images of family members, but a surprising number were of stoves, kitchen shelves, and wells.

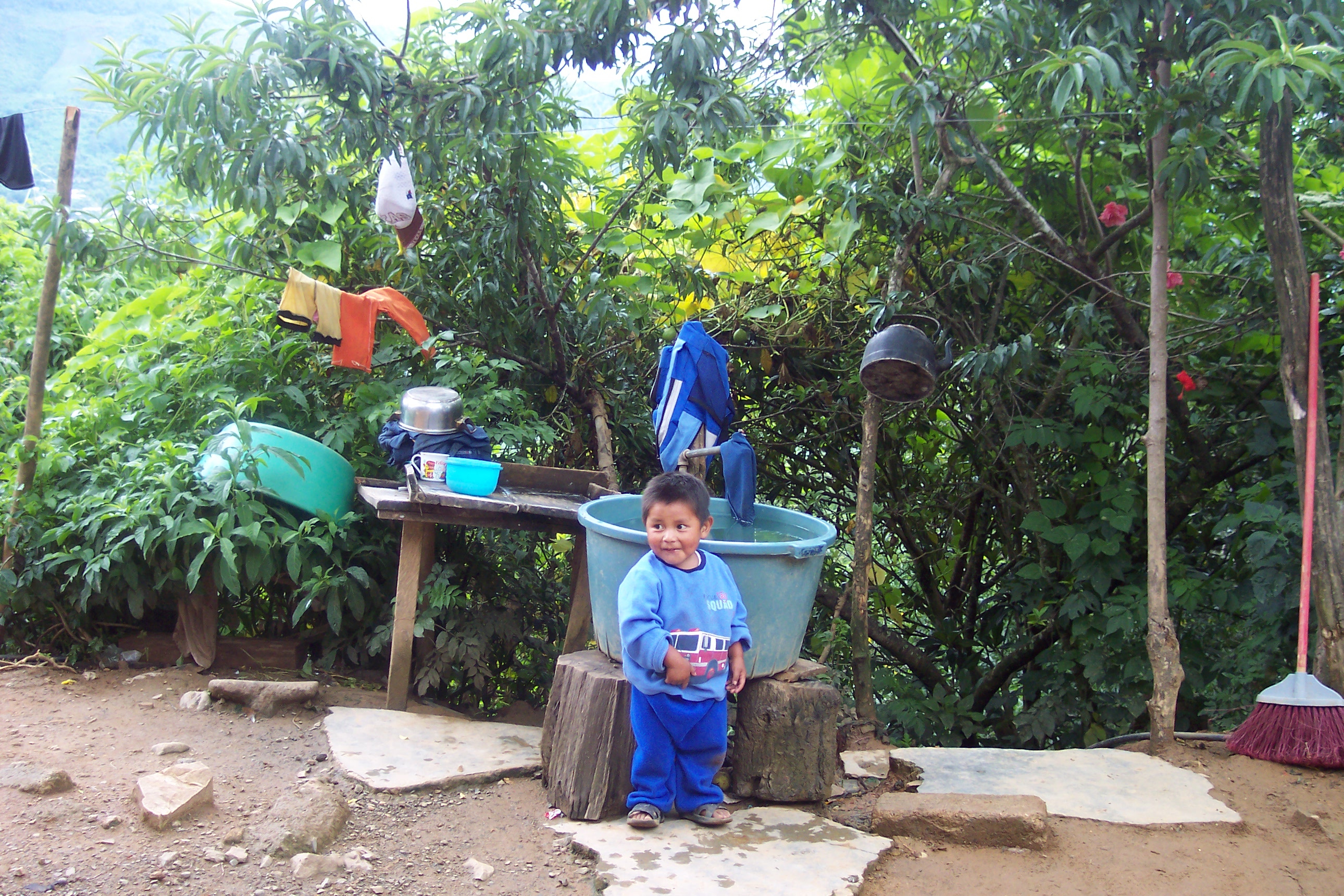
See more images here: https://www.pih.org/article/women-in-chiapas-mexico-document-their-lives-advocate-their-concerns

=== Russia ===
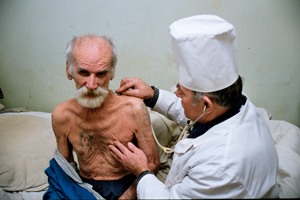
A patient living with MDR-TB receives care in Russia.

Partners In Health's work in Russia has a narrower medical focus over a vastly wider geographical area than any of its other projects. From a base in the region of Tomsk Oblast, Siberia, PIH has been working since 1998, in collaboration with the Russian Ministry of Health, to combat one of the world's worst epidemics of drug-resistant tuberculosis (MDR-TB). As of 2014, 39,000 Russians had the disease. In partnership with the Division of Social Medicine and Health Inequalities (DSMHI) at the Brigham and Women's Hospital, PIH has focused on improving clinical services for MDR-TB patients in Tomsk while undertaking training and research to catalyze change in treatment of MDR-TB across the entire Russian Federation.

Partners In Health began working with local clinicians to improve treatment of MDR-TB in Tomsk in 1998. The joint effort got a major boost in 2004, when a five-year, $10.8 million grant was secured from the Global Fund to Fight AIDS, Tuberculosis and Malaria for efforts to improve prevention, diagnosis and treatment of TB and MDR-TB. Key components of the clinical effort include improving diagnostics in order to detect cases earlier, developing a comprehensive strategy to promote adherence among patients, improving infection control in hospitals and clinics and decreasing transmission of TB to HIV-positive patients. Work in Tomsk also encompasses health education for the public and clinical and program management training for medical personnel in Tomsk.

Partners In Health operates in two other regions in Russia, Voronezh Oblast and Karelia, where technical assistance is provided to regional tuberculosis services.

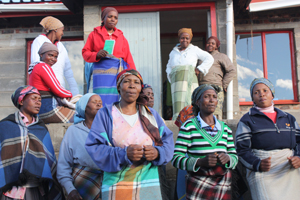
Community Health Workers in Lesotho receive monthly trainings.

=== Lesotho ===
Approximately one quarter of Lesotho's adult population is HIV-positive and life expectancy in the country is 55 years for women and 52 for men. In 2024, Selibe Mochoboroane Mochoboroane, then Lesotho's Minister of Health, said that Lesotho had the second highest incidence of tuberculosis in the world. In 2022, over 15,000 people contracted tuberculosis in Lesotho, and approximately 14 percent of those patients died of the disease.

The PIH project in Lesotho was launched in 2006 following an invitation from the Lesotho's Ministry of Health. The programs and projects are known as Bo-Mphato Litšebeletsong tsa Bophelo and include Botšabelo Hospital, a specialist tuberculosis hospital, and programs focused on mental and maternal health.

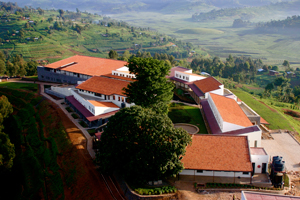
An aerial image of PIH's new Butaro Hospital, the largest public facility in Rwanda

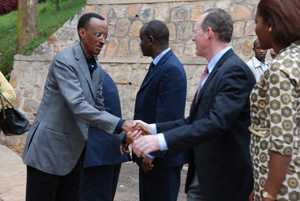
Rwandan President Paul Kagame and PIH's Paul Farmer at the Butaro ribbon cutting ceremony in 2011

=== Rwanda ===
Partners In Health/Inshuti Mu Buzima (IMB) has been working in Rwanda since 2005. In partnership with the Government of Rwanda and the Clinton Health Access Initiative (CHAI), IMB's work supports the Ministry of Health to comprehensively strengthen the public health system in rural, underserved areas of the country. Initially, PIH and CHAI began by implementing a pilot project in two rural districts, Kayonza and Kirehe, in Rwanda's Eastern Province. Building off of PIH's approach in Haiti, the project was designed as a comprehensive primary health care model within the public sector. The approach used HIV/AIDS prevention and care as the entry point to build capacity to address the major health problems faced by the local population. Haitian physicians, nurses, and managers traveled to Rwanda extensively in the early years of the program to provide training and program design assistance.

==== Inshuti Mu Buzima-supported facilities ====
In January 2011, PIH supported the Ministry of Health of Rwanda in the opening of Butaro District Hospital. The hospital, located in Burera district, has 156 beds.

==== University of Global Health Equity ====
In September 2015, Partners In Health inaugurated University of Global Health Equity, a non-for-profit organization offering a two-year part-time master's degree in Global Health Delivery. Construction began in September 2016 on the first phase of a campus located in Butaro. The new campus officially opened in January 2019.

=== Malawi ===
In early 2007, Abwenzi Pa Za Umoyo (APZU; Partners In Health in Chichewa), started treating patients and training community health workers in the southwestern corner of Malawi, one of the poorest and most densely populated countries in Africa.

The Clinton-Hunter Development Initiative (CHDI) targeted Malawi as a country desperately needing a rural health project to address the devastating HIV/AIDS epidemic in the region. About 14 percent of Malawi's adult population is infected with HIV and hundreds of thousands of children have been orphaned by the disease. CHDI asked Partners In Health to replicate the rural initiative programs that have proven so successful in delivering HIV treatment and comprehensive primary health care in Rwanda and Lesotho. The Malawi Ministry of Health directed PIH and CHDI to the impoverished rural area of Neno.

In 2010, APZU tested 17,606 patients for HIV. The organization clinics logged 332,619 patient visits. APZU supported 889 children, allowing them to attend school and receive food.

=== Sierra Leone ===
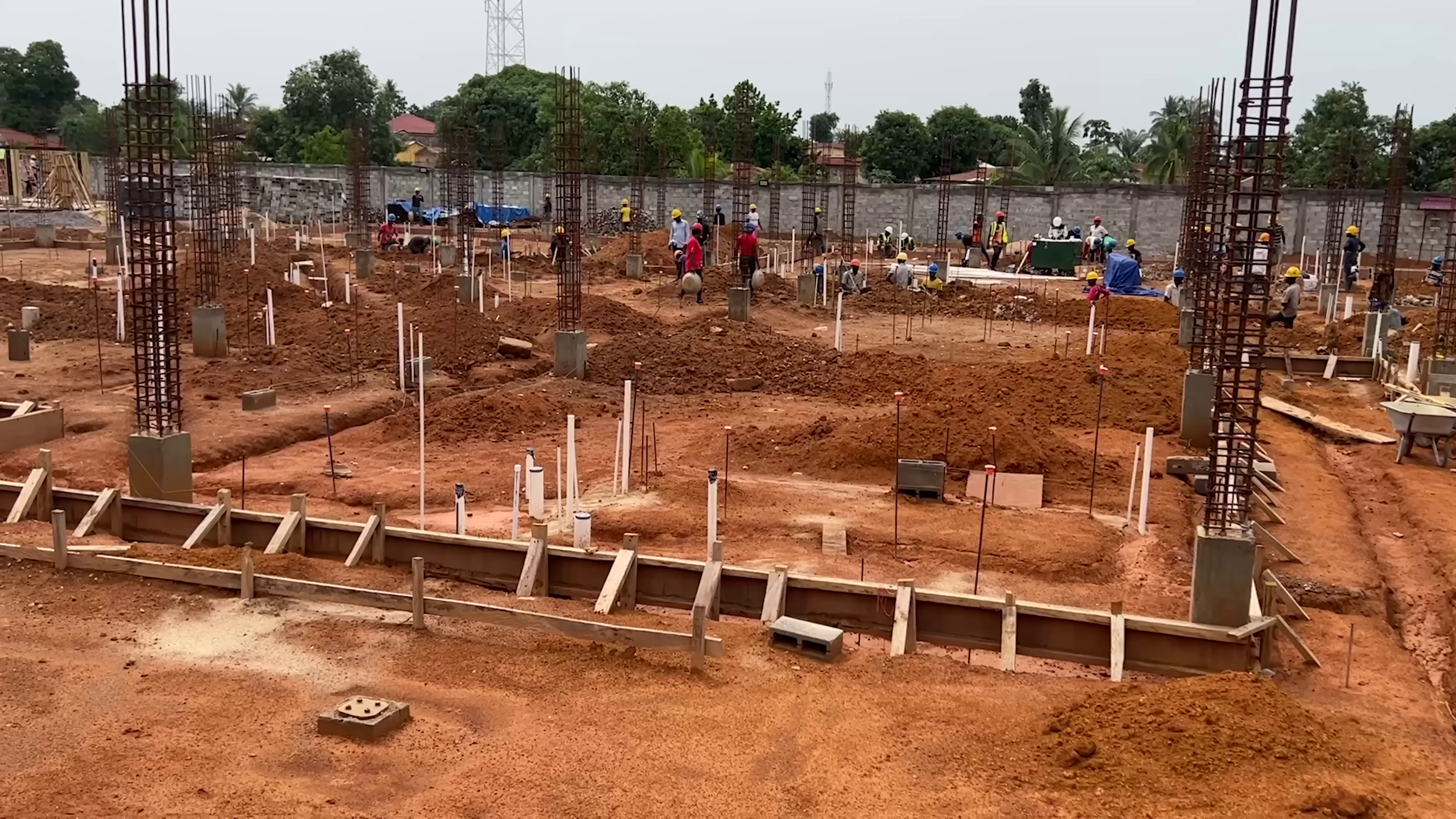
A maternity hospital in Sierra Leone being built with support from Partners in Health

In late 2014, PIH heeded calls from the governments of Sierra Leone and Liberia, and other international partners, to join the fight against Ebola in West Africa. They began in Port Loko District at the Maforki Ebola Treatment Unit and scaled up from there to provide clinical care at 16 facilities across 4 districts at the peak, while managing a network of Ebola response community health workers, providing surveillance, support and referrals in rural communities.

The organization took a health systems strengthening approach and aimed to work together with government entities to support the response to the outbreak. As Ebola was brought under control, PIH shifted to support the Ministry of Health in rebuilding its health system. Today PIH's Sierra Leone program is focused on raising the standard of care through programs in Kono and Port Loko Districts, with a focus on maternal health, HIV/TB and Ebola survivor care. PIH currently supports six health facilities across three districts in Sierra Leone, one being the Paul E. Farmer Maternal Center of Excellence, which has Sierra Leone's first neonatal intensive care unit.

=== Liberia ===
PIH focused on responding to the Ebola outbreak in Maryland County, a 20-hour drive south from the capital of Monrovia. They supported two Ebola treatment units and three community care centers, and taught teachers and community members new techniques to slow the spread of infections. Since Ebola came under control in Liberia in March 2015, PIH has focused on helping rebuild the health system, primarily for a population of roughly 100,000 in Maryland County.

=== Kazakhstan ===
Since 2009, PIH has worked in Kazakhstan with the Ministry of Health to provide services treating MDR-TB.

=== United States ===
PIH launched its U.S. arm in May 2020 in response to the COVID-19 pandemic.

=== Global Tuberculosis Policy Impact ===
In August 2024, the World Health Organization approved safer and shorter treatment regimens for tuberculosis, a shift shaped by groundbreaking research led by Partners In Health and its partners."2025 Annual Report". Partners In Health. November 20, 2025. Following this, in 2025, PIH Lesotho launched a district-wide implementation of the "Search, Treat, Prevent" strategy. This integrated approach aims to serve as a national model for global TB elimination strategies."Shaping the Future of TB Care". Partners In Health. November 20, 2025.

=== Partner projects ===
PIH also supports partner projects in the following countries:

- North America: PACT in USA,
- Central America: Equipo Técnico de Educación en Salud Comunitaria in Guatemala
- Africa: Project Muso in Mali; Tiyatien Health in Liberia; Village Health Works in Burundi; Pivot in Madagascar
- Asia: Possible Health in Nepal; Advanced Access & Delivery in India

== Previous Work ==
=== Russia ===
Partners In Health's work in Russia had a narrower medical focus over a vastly wider geographical area than any of its other projects. From a base in the region of Tomsk Oblast, Siberia, PIH had started working in 1988, in collaboration with the Russian Ministry of Health as well as local clinicians, to combat one of the world's worst epidemics of drug-resistant tuberculosis (MDR-TB). The joint effort got a major boost in 2004, when a five-year, $10.8 million grant was secured from the Global Fund to Fight AIDS, Tuberculosis and Malaria for efforts to improve prevention, diagnosis and treatment of TB and MDR-TB. Key components of the clinical effort included improving diagnostics in order to detect cases earlier, developing a comprehensive strategy to promote adherence among patients, improving infection control in hospitals and clinics and decreasing transmission of TB to HIV-positive patients. Work in Tomsk also encompassed health education for the public and clinical and program management training for medical personnel in Tomsk.

Partners In Health operated in two other regions in Russia, Voronezh Oblast and Karelia, where technical assistance is provided to regional tuberculosis services.

=== Dominican Republic ===
PIH helped Zanmi Lassante establish an HIV program at the Rosa Duarte Hospital in Elias Piña, Dominican Republic in 2011.

== Controversy ==
A PIH clinician developed Ebola at a government-run treatment center in Port Loko, Sierra Leone, where they were responding to the Ebola outbreak in 2015. The site was closed after this, though staff members stated that it should have been closed sooner due to safety deficiencies.
