= EPSF =

EPSF may refer to:

- Encapsulated PostScript file, an image file format
- polystyrene
- Egyptian Pharmaceutical Students' Federation
- Établissement public de sécurité ferroviaire, a public administrative body under the supervision of the Direction générale des infrastructures, des transports et des mobilités.
