= DSSA =

The term DSSA can stand for a number of things, including:

- Dian Swastatika Sentosa, the energy subsidiary of Indonesian conglomerate Sinar Mas
- Dental Students' Scientific Association of Egypt
- The U.S. Defense Security Service Academy
- domain-specific software architecture
- Department of Anti-terrorism Strategic Studies, an Italian organization under investigation by the Italian police
- Denver Society of Security Analysts
- The Distributed System Security Architecture, a computer security architecture
- The Duluth, South Shore and Atlantic Railroad
- Dynamic Security Surveillance Agent, a software application written in Java language
- The Duluth Superior Sailing Association, offering the joy of sailing to the entire Duluth-Superior community.
- Data Storage System for ACSF, a system to record information about the driving with an automatically commanded steering function.
