= Dental Students' Scientific Association of Egypt =

- الجمعية العلمية لطلاب طب الأسنان بمصر
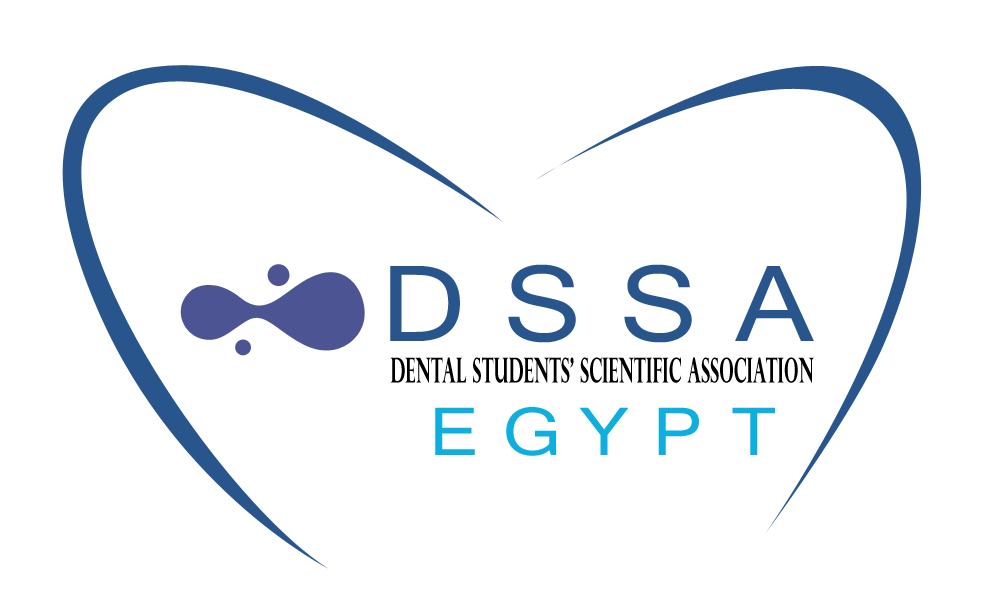
- Abbreviation: DSSA-Egypt
- Formation: September 1970
- Founder: Prof. Dr. Mahmoud Elhadary
- Founded at: Faculty of Dentistry Alexandria University, Egypt
- Type: NGO
- Legal status: Active
- Headquarters: Alexandria Faculty of Dentistry
- Location: All over Egypt
- Members: Full County Member Association in International Association of Dental Students (1972)
- President: Gamal ElGhonemy
- general secretary: Aya Eida
- National Exchange Officer: Donia Mohammed
- External Relations Officer: Mohammed Abdellatif
- Key people: Dr. Bassem ElMalakh – IADS President 1982 Dr. Ahmed Hawas – IADS General Secretary 2002; Dr. Amir Elkholi – IADS Treasurer 2012; Dr. Abanoub Riad – IADS Editor 2016–2018 / General Secretary 2018/2019 Dr. Maryam Alahmady - IADS Vice President of Research and Education 2023/2024
- Parent organization: International Association of Dental Students
- Website: http://dssa.org.eg

Dental Students' Scientific Association of Egypt (Arabic: الجمعية العلمية لطلاب طب الأسنان بمصر) is a non-governmental organization that aims mainly to promote public awareness of oral and dental health among Egyptian society, and to improve the scientific knowledge and soft skills of Egyptian and non-Egyptian dental students all over Arab Republic of Egypt.

== History ==
In September 1969, group of students from Alexandria Faculty of Dentistry with Prof. Dr. Mahmoud Elhadary (dean of faculty at that time) traveled to Prague (capital of Czechoslovakia at that time) to attend the annual meeting of the International Association of Dental Students.

They were impressed by activities and projects which are organized by IADS and its national and local member organizations worldwide, so they decided to bring this idea to their home country.

Later 1970, Dental Students' Scientific Association of Egypt was officially established and recognized by its headquarters university (Alexandria University). Then two years later, the International Association of Dental Students has accepted the application for Full Country Membership of DSSA-Egypt.

In 2005, Faculty of Dentistry – Tanta University has decided to join this national association which represents Egyptian dental students globally. By the next year, Tanta Scientific Association of Dental Students (TSADS) won the Full Local Membership in DSSA-Egypt to be the second Local member after Alexandria.

== Membership ==
The membership of Dental Students' Scientific Association of Egypt is divided up into two main categories:

- Local Organization Membership, which may be Full Membership or Corresponding Membership.
- Individual Membership, like Honorary Life Membership and Supporting Membership.

Below is the list of Local Organization Membership

Name of Organization	Abbreviation	Location	Type of Membership
Dental Students' Scientific Association of Alexandria	DSSA-Alexandria	Alexandria	Full Membership
Tanta Scientific Association of Dental Students	TSADS	Tanta	Full Membership
Dental Students' Scientific Association of Ain-Shams University	DSSA-ASU	Cairo	Full Membership
Dental Students' Scientific Association of Minia University	DSSA-Minia	Minia	Full Membership
Suez Canal Dental Students Association	SCDSA	Ismailia	Full Membership
Dental Committee of Modern Sciences and Arts University	DCMSA	6 October City	Full Membership
Dental Students' Scientific Association of British University in Egypt	DSSA-BUE	Cairo	Full Membership
Dental Students' Scientific Association of Kafr Elsheikh University	DSSA-KFS	Kafr Elsheikh	Full Membership
Dental Students' Scientific Association of South Valley University	DSSA-Qena	Qena	Full Membership
Dental Students' Scientific Association of Sinai University	DSSA-Sinai	Al-Arish, Sinai	Full Membership
Dental Students' Scientific Association of Delta University	DSSA-Delta	Mansoura	Full Membership
Dental Students' Scientific Association of Misr International University	DSSA-MIU	Cairo	Full Membership
Dental Students' Scientific Association of Misr University for Science & Technology University	DSSA-MUST	6 October City	Full Membership
Dental Students' Scientific Association of Arab Academy for Science and Technology	DSSA-AAST	Alamein City	Full Membership
Dental Students' Scientific Association of Egyptian Russian University	DSSA-ERU	Badr City	Corresponding Membership
Dental Students' Scientific Association of Badr University in Cairo	DSSA-BUC	Badr City	Corresponding Membership
Dental Students' Scientific Association of Al-Azhar University	DSSA-Azhar	Cairo and Assiut	Corresponding Membership
Dental Students' Scientific Association of Mansoura University	DSSA-Mansoura	Mansoura	Corresponding Membership
Dental Students' Scientific Association of Nahda University in Beni Suef	DSSA-NUB	Beni Suef	Corresponding Membership
Dental Students' Scientific Association of Pharos University in Alexandria	DSSA-Pharos	Alexandria	Corresponding Membership
Dental Students' Scientific Association of Future University in Egypt	DSSA-FUE	Cairo	Corresponding Membership
Dental Students' Scientific Association of Beni Suef University	DSSA-BSU	Beni Suef	Corresponding Membership
Dental Students' Scientific Association of Assiut University	DSSA-Assiut	Assiut	Corresponding Membership
Dental Students' Scientific Association of Modern University for Technology & Information	DSSA-MTI	Cairo	Corresponding Membership
Dental Students' Scientific Association of Future University in Egypt	DSSA-FUE	Cairo	Corresponding Membership

== See also ==
- Egyptian Pharmaceutical Students Federation (EPSF)
- FDI World Dental Federation
- International Association of Dental Students (IADS)
- International Federation of Medical Students Associations (IFMSA)
