= Swiss Medical Students' Association =

Student organization (1917-)

- Verband Schweizer Medizinstudierende Association Suisse des Etudiants en Médecine Associazione degli Studenti di Medicina Svizzeri
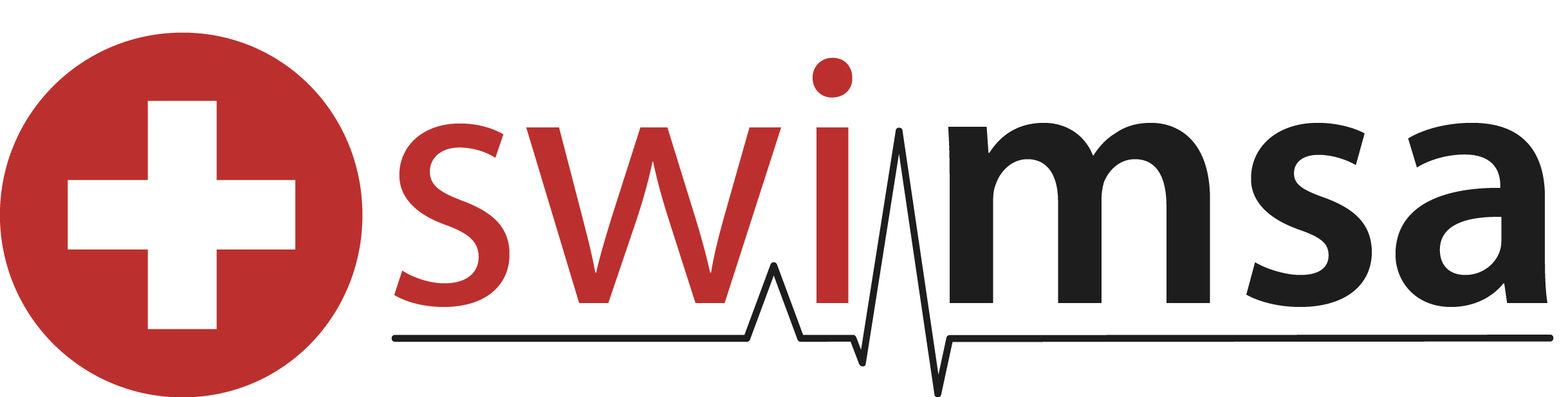
- Abbreviation: swimsa
- Formation: 1917
- Type: Student organization; Professional organization; Nonprofit organization
- Headquarters: Bern
- Location: Switzerland
- Members: 10’000+ medical students
- Official language: German, French, English, Italian
- President: Matthias Schütz
- Secretary General: Robin Seelhofer
- Main organ: Delegate’s Assembly
- Parent organization: International Federation of Medical Students' Associations (IFMSA)
- Affiliations: International Federation of Medical Students' Associations; VSAO; Swiss Medical Association FMH; Swiss Federal Office of Public Health FOPH; Swiss Students' Union VSS-UNES-USU
- Website: swimsa.ch

The Swiss Medical Students’ Association (swimsa) is an independent association representing all medical students in Switzerland. It was founded in 1917, and currently maintains 31 member organisations, comprising 11 local medical students' associations and 20 public health and awareness organisations or projects.

All medical students in Basel, Bern, Fribourg, Geneva, Lausanne, Lucerne, Lugano, St. Gallen, and Zürich are represented by swimsa on a national and international level.

== History ==
In 1917, the medical faculties of Switzerland united to form the Association of Swiss Clinicians (Verband der Schweizer Klinkerschaften, VDSK).

In 1951, the IFMSA (International Federation of Medical Students' Associations) was founded by the VDSK and associations of six other countries in Copenhagen, Denmark. Since then, the IFMSA has represented the interests of medical students on an international level. Later, the VDSK was reformed into the Association of Swiss Medical Students (Verband der Schweizer Medizinstudenten) VSM, from which the organization IFMSA Switzerland had split, concentrating solely on professional clinical exchange for medical students.

In 2006, the VMS and IFMSA Switzerland approached each other and decided to create a joined venture under the name of Swiss Medical Students’ Association (swimsa). Nonetheless, IFMSA-Switzerland became swimsa Exchanges and remained a legally independent organization, still responsible for international exchanges. Further founding members of swimsa were the medical student organizations Achtung Liebe, promoting sexual health and education, and Gruhu, enabling medical students to volunteer for clinical electives in third world countries.

In 2014, the organization swimsa Exchanges was dissolved and formally integrated into swimsa.

== Member Organisations ==
The student councils of the medical faculties of Basel, Bern, Fribourg, Geneva, Lausanne, Lucerne, Lugano, St. Gallen, and Zurich are recognized as members of swimsa with voting rights at the national delegate assembly, which takes place twice a year. Other medical student organizations, also known as swimsa projects, are represented as members with voting rights as well. Currently there are ten such organizations/projects. Usually the organization/projects have their own constitutions and are as such de jure independent from swimsa.

Medical Faculty	Full Name	University	Number of Students
fvmed	Fachverein Medizin	Zurich	1800
AEMG	Association des Etudiants en Médecine de Genève	Geneva	1400
AEML	Association des Etudiantes en Médecine de Lausanne	Lausanne	1600
FaMed	Fachschaft Medizin	Fribourg	300
FaMBa	Fachschaft Medizin Basel	Basel	900
FSMB	Fachschaft der Medizin Universität Bern	Bern	1300
mesa	Medical Students Association ETH Zürich	Zurich	300
FluMed	Fachverein Luzerner Medizinstudierenden	Luzern	
smusi	Studenti di medicina dell'Università della Svizzera italiana	Lugano	
MUSt	Medizinstudierende an der Universität St. Gallen	St. Gallen	

Organisation	Locations	Purpose
Achtung Liebe	Basel, Berne, Zurich	Sexual and Reproductive Health incl. HIV/AIDS Awareness & Peer-Education
EROS	Lausanne	Educating future physicians and the general public on the vast taboo subject of sexual health
escolhares	Lausanne	Offering free eye exams and eyeglasses to schoolchildren in Rio de Janeiro, Brazil
Marrow Switzerland	Basel, Berne, Fribourg, Geneva, Lausanne, Zurich	Blood Stem Cell Awareness, Information & Registration
GRUHU Gruppe für UnterassistentInnen und medizinische Entwicklungszusammenarbeit	Zurich	Humanitarian Internships in 3rd World Countries
Doctors and Death	Fribourg, Geneva, Lausanne	Offering medical students a platform to exchange thoughts and feelings on how to deal with death, suffering, rupture.
Teddybear Hospital	Basel, Berne, Fribourg, Geneva, Lausanne, Zurich	Allowing children to come into contact with medicine, create trust with doctors and hospitals
MedSICS	Lausanne	Promoting mental health among medical students
M.E.T.I.S.	Lausanne	Public Health Projects and Social Awareness in and around Lausanne, Ecuador, and Tanzania
ASC Action Santé Communautaire	Geneva	Public Health Projects and Social Awareness in and around Geneva
UAEM University Allied for Essential Medecine	Basel, Berne, Fribourg, Geneva, Lausanne	Medicines and innovations in the medical field should be accessible to everyone
Medstache	Fribourg, Geneva, Lausanne	Movember, Men's Health Awareness & Fundraising
AGT Aufklärung gegen Tabak	Bern	Voluntary smoke prevention project by medical students for pupils from 7th to 9th grade
ASTiM Associazione Studenti Ticinesi di Medicina	Switzerland	Bringing together Ticino medical students enrolled in all faculties throughout Switzerland
Young Sonographers	Switzerland	Section of the Swiss Society for Ultrasound in Medicine (SGUM) and are committed to the ultrasound training of students and interns
Ligue Academique de Medecine Aigue (LAMA)	Geneva, Switzerland	Advancing medical education and improving engagement in acute, emergency, catastrophe, humanitarian and critical care medicine.

== Activities ==
swimsa is the official representation of Swiss dental and medical students and has seats in various commissions, such as the Commission of Swiss Medical Faculties SMIFK (Schweizerische medizinische Interfakultätskommission) or the Federal Office of Public Health. In addition, swimsa organizes international exchanges and takes part at the activities of the IFMSA. The association collaborates with various projects and organizations on the topics of public health, medical education, sexual and reproductive health including HIV/AIDS, and human rights. The Swiss Medical Students' Convention (SMSC) takes place twice a year and enables students throughout Switzerland to meet and exchange experiences and ideas. A trainings weekend is organized once a year.

== Awards ==
swimsa honors medical students with the "U ROCK swimsa Award".

The "U ROCK swimsa Award" is presented twice a year during the SMSC (usually in April and November) to people who have shown excellent commitment and endurance. The candidates are nominated by medical students to be voted on by the national delegate assembly. The following list shows the recipients since its introduction:

- 2008
  - Karin Helsing
  - David Eisner
- 2009
  - Carla Gürtler
  - Patrizia Kündig
- 2010
  - Gaby Moser
  - Sergej Staubli
- 2011
  - Nicola Rüegsegger
  - Alexandra Leuenberger
- 2012
  - Samuel Zweifel
  - Roland Fischer
- 2013
  - Alexandre Moser
  - Rainer Tan
  - Samuel Heiniger
- 2014
  - Clara Sailer
  - Anna Wang | Zurich
- 2015
  - Andrea Mauracher | Zurich
  - Noémie Boss | Berne
  - Mirjam Ryter | Basel
- 2016
  - Eleonora Frau | Fribourg
  - Anna Schmidt
- 2017
  - Dominic Schmid
  - Benjamin Magyar
- 2018
  - Grace Corella
  - Cédric Fricker
- 2019
  - Federico Mazzola
  - Margaux Saudan
- 2020
  - Robin Walter
  - Gaia Grigorov
- 2021
  - Simone Temperli
  - Stephanie Hauser
- 2022
  - Estelle Delamare
  - Lorena Mackinnon Lacasa
- 2023
  - Matias Jacomet
  - Rahel Laager
- 2024
  - Aurélia Hepner
  - Abeelan Rasadurai
- 2025
  - Kevin Brunold
  - Danai Bucher
- 2026
  - Diego Ryf

== See also ==
- American Medical Student Association (AMSA-USA)
- Australian Medical Students' Association (AMSA-AUS)
- Turkish Medical Students' International Committee (TurkMSIC)
- New Zealand Medical Students' Association (NZMSA)
- International Federation of Medical Students' Associations (IFMSA)
