= Women Leaders in Global Health Conference =

Publication details
- Frequency: Annual
- Website: Official website

The Women Leaders in Global Health Conference, created by Michele Barry and first held in 2017 at Stanford University in partnership with Women in Global Health, the US National Institutes of Health and others, is an international conference that engages both men and women to address the gender gap in global health leadership.

Thereafter, the conference has taken place annually with the second and third in the UK and Rwanda, respectively. The fourth, in 2020, was virtual.

== Origin and purpose ==
The Women Leaders in Global Health Conference was founded by Michele Barry after she questioned why a panel at an annual Medical Education Partnership Initiative meeting were all men. With the help from one of the men on that panel and in partnership with Women in Global Health, the US National Institutes of Health and others, the conference was created to be international, highlighting new and established women leaders in global health, and engaging both men and women to address the gender gap in global health leadership. The first conference was held in 2017 at Stanford University, where it was emphasised that the chief barrier to leadership roles for women was a lack of mentoring. This was confirmed in a study published in Annals of Global Health after surveying 405 delegates. Although mentoring was seen as key to achieving a leadership role, one delegate noted that despite having a male mentor, he still thought of a man when a leadership role arose.

== Conferences ==
In 2018, led by Heidi Larson, the second conference was held at the London School of Hygiene & Tropical Medicine in London with more than 900 participants of greater than 80 nationalities and coming from more than 70 countries. Some were unable to attend due to visa refusals. Stories heard at the conference included the gang-rape of a health worker after she promoted education and family planning for girls in India, and the abduction and murder of women working to eradicate polio. Speakers included Wafaa El-Sadr, Joanne Liu, Anita Zaidi, Ayoade Olatunbosun-Alakija and Claire Bayntun.

The third conference was held over two days at the University of Global Health Equity in Kigali, Rwanda in 2019 with more than 1000 attendees from 81 countries. Each of 26 panels included a man. Speakers and attendees included Agnes Binagwaho, Senait Fisseha, Jeannette Kagame, Paul Farmer, Princess Dina Mired of Jordan, Patricia Garcia, Camara Jones, Folake Olayinka and Joia Mukherjee. During the conference it was announced that “Women Leaders in Global Health” would become “WomenLift Health” and at the end Diane Gashumba gave the closing speech.

Due to the COVID-19 pandemic, the 2020 conference was virtual. At that meeting the Secretary-General of the United Nations noted that "women are making up over 70% of the world’s health workforce, but seven out of 10 global health leaders are men." Soumya Swaminathan, chief scientist at the WHO and the former Director General (DG) of the Indian Council of Medical Research, revealed difficulties she experienced as a woman researcher.

== See also ==
- Roopa Dhatt
