= Ayoade =

Ayoade may refer to:

- Richard Ayoade (born 1977), British actor, comedian and filmmaker
- Ayoade Ademola Adeseun (born 1953), Nigerian politician
- Ayoade Bamgboye, Nigerian and British comedian
- Ayoade Olatunbosun-Alakija, Nigeria's former chief humanitarian coordinator.
