= Keshia Pollack Porter =

American injury epidemiologist and policy researcher

- Born: Keshia M. Pollack
- Education: Tufts University; Yale University; Johns Hopkins University
- Scientific career
- Fields: Injury epidemiology, health equity
- Workplaces: Johns Hopkins Bloomberg School of Public Health
- Doctoral advisor: Gary S. Sorock
- Other academic advisors: Susan Pardee Baker; Mark Cullen; Linda Degutis

Keshia M. Pollack Porter is an American injury epidemiologist and policy researcher who specializes in health equity and promoting safe environments. She is the Dean of the Johns Hopkins Bloomberg School of Public Health, where she also holds a Bloomberg Centennial Professorship.

== Life ==
Pollack was born in Rockville Centre, New York to Yvonne Pollack. She earned a B.A. in sociology with a certificate in community health from Tufts University in 2000. She completed a M.P.H. in chronic disease epidemiology from the Yale School of Public Health in 2002. Her master's thesis was titled, Quantifying the Extent and Direction of the Occupational Injury Sex Disparity. Mark Cullen and Linda Degutis were her co-advisors. From 2004 to 2005, she was an intern to the health and government operations committee of the Maryland House of Delegates.

Pollack earned a Ph.D. at the Johns Hopkins Bloomberg School of Public Health in 2005. Her dissertation was titled, The Impact of Body Mass Index on Nonfatal Traumatic Occupational Injury in Hourly Manufacturing Employees. Gary S. Sorock was her advisor. Susan P. Baker and Cullen served as co-advisors. She was a postdoctoral fellow in the research and evaluation unit at the Robert Wood Johnson Foundation.

Pollack Porter is a faculty member in the department of health policy and management. In 2021, she was made a Bloomberg Centennial Professor at the Johns Hopkins Bloomberg School of Public Health. She is an injury epidemiologist and policy researcher who serves as the director of the institute for health and social policy. Her research focuses on health equity and promoting safe environments. In 2023, she was elected a member of the National Academy of Medicine. She began her tenure as the 12th Dean of the Johns Hopkins Bloomberg School of Public Health in August of 2025.

== Personal life ==
Pollack met Edward Porter, an IT supervisor from Alliance, Ohio in April 2015. They married on September 2, 2017 at the Kimpton Hotel Monaco Washington DC. They reside in Middle River, Maryland.
