= Roopa Dhatt =

Indian-American physician

- Born: India
- Education: University of California; Paris Institute of Political Studies; Temple University School of Medicine
- Known for: President International Federation of Medical Students' Associations (2012-2013); Co-founder Women in Global Health (2015); Women Leaders in Global Health Conference
- Medical career
- Profession: Physician
- Institutions: Georgetown University Medical Center
- Sub-specialties: Internal medicine

Roopa Dhatt is an Indian American physician, an Assistant Professor and Internal Medicine Hospitalist at Georgetown University Medical Center, and at a community hospital, Washington, DC. In 2015 she co-founded Women in Global Health, which aims to reduce gender disparity among global health leaders, and subsequently became the organisation's Executive Director.

During the COVID-19 pandemic, she highlighted the gender aspects of COVID-19, including that a disproportionate number of frontline workers are women, yet not part of leadership roles. She was part of a team that evaluated the language used by men and women leaders during the pandemic.

== Early life and education ==
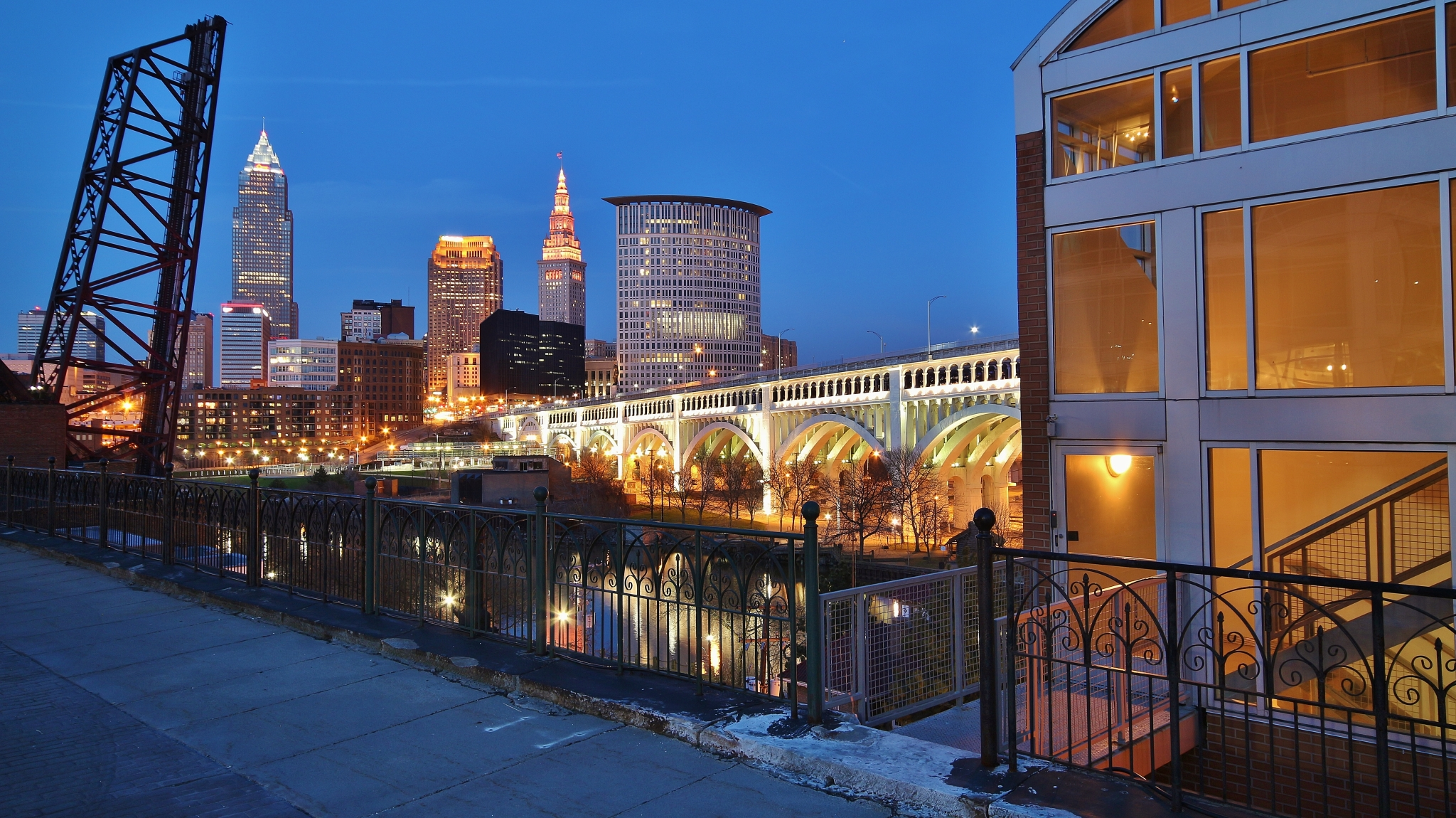
Cleveland, home of the Case Western Reserve University School of Medicine

Roopa Dhatt was born in the 1980s in India, and emigrated to the United States at the age of five. She later recalled her exposure to health inequities during a visit to India in the early 1990s when she was nine years old, leading her to pursue a career in medicine.

She earned a bachelor's degree in cell biology and African-American and African studies from the University of California, Davis, and a master's degree in public affairs from the Paris Institute of Political Studies. She received her M.D. from Temple University School of Medicine in Philadelphia. In 2012, as a medical student, she became president of the International Federation of Medical Students' Associations.

== Career ==
Prior to becoming a physician in Internal medicine at Georgetown University Medical Centerin Washington, DC, Dhatt trained in internal medicine and international health at the Case Western Reserve University School of Medicine in Cleveland.

=== Women in Global Health ===
In 2015 she co-founded an organisation which aims to reduce gender disparity among global health leaders, the Women in Global Health, of which she is the Executive Director. She is one of the Women Leaders in the Global Health Conferences.

Dhatt was terminated from the organization in May 2024 following an investigation which revealed a toxic and retaliatory work environment and unearthed accusations of racial discrimination, as well as resistance to change on the part of Dhatt. The toxic environment under Dhatt's leadership was described by terms such as "white supremacy", "power hoarding" and "a sink-or-swim mentality." In one case, a mother of a newborn was denied a request to work part time for a month, even after she was overwhelmed in her duties and had to face the effects of a disaster in her own country.

=== COVID-19 pandemic ===
In September 2020, representing Women in Global Health at a Women in Global Health Security Summit, Dhatt highlighted that a disproportionate number of frontline workers are women, many providing informal unpaid care.

In the same year, she was part of a team that evaluated the language used by men and women leaders during the COVID-19 pandemic. The findings were published in BMJ Global Health in a paper titled "Political and gender analysis of speeches made by heads of government during the COVID-19 pandemic."
