= Michele Barry =

Physician and medical researcher

- Education: Bryn Mawr College, Albert Einstein College of Medicine, Yale University, Yale New Haven Hospital - Residency and Fellowship
- Occupations: Internal medicine and tropical disease physician, researcher, and global health advocate
- Known for: Founder of WomenLift Health; Global health education and mentorship; Tropical and Travel Medicine
- Medical career
- Field: Internal medicine; Tropical diseases; Emerging infectious diseases
- Institutions: Stanford University

Michele Barry is a professor of medicine. She became Stanford's inaugural Senior Associate Dean of global health in 2009 and started the Stanford Center for Innovation in Global Health in 2010. Prior to this, she was a professor at Yale, where she started the first refugee health clinic and homeless health mobile van project, for which she was awarded the Elm Ivy Mayor’s Award. She specializes in tropical medicine, emerging infectious diseases, women’s leadership in global health, and human and planetary health.

== Advocacy and leadership ==
Barry is an advocate for women's rights in the medical profession. She wrote the first policy for maternity leave in the Department of Medicine at Yale. Later, she created the Women Leaders in Global Health Conference, first held in Stanford in 2017. The following year, she was the recipient of the Elizabeth Blackwell Medal by the American Medical Women's Association. She is the founder of WomenLift Health, an international nonprofit dedicated to accelerating the involvement of women in global health leadership.

Barry is also an advocate for global health education. She chaired the educational initiative of American Society of Tropical Medicine & Hygiene to develop guidelines and a certification process for training in tropical medicine in the US. She developed one of the first programs to introduce overseas training in residency programs in the US (formerly Johnson and Johnson Global Scholars program, now the Stanford-Yale Global Health Scholars program). She is a cofounder of the Stanford-Yale Global Health Equity Scholars Program, which has trained physician-scientists in the U.S.and overseas. She founded the Stanford Global Health Media Fellowship, currently in partnership with CNN and Stanford Journalism, and the first web-based training addressing the ethical of challenges of short-term rotations.

Through the Stanford Center for Innovation in Global Health, Dr. Barry has allocated funding from donors for global health initiatives and research. She works in Planetary Health and is an advocate for directing attention to this field. Under her direction, the Stanford Center for Innovation in Global Health focuses on three pillars: Refugees & Vulnerable Populations, Women’s Leadership in Global Health, and Human and Planetary Health.

== Biography ==
Barry graduated in medicine from Albert Einstein College of Medicine in 1977 and subsequently completed her internship, residency, and chief residency at Yale-New Haven Hospital, and her rheumatology fellowship at Yale University School of Medicine. She completed her tropical medicine training at Walter Reed Hospital and at various overseas settings where she has lived, such as Zimbabwe, Ecuador, South Africa, and others.

Barry is a Fellow of the American College of Physicians. In 2009, she was appointed both Stanford's Director of the Center for Innovation in Global Health and Senior Associate Dean for Global Health. In 2011 she became a Fellow of the American Society of Tropical Medicine and Hygiene, of which she was also a past president. In 2017, she was elected to the Global Health Advisory Board of the National Academy of Medicine to serve for five years.

Barry created the Women Leaders in Global Health Conference in response to the underrepresentation of women in leadership positions in global health. At its first meeting in 2017, she stated that

At least 75% of the global health workforce is female, as are the majority of caregivers and the most vulnerable patients. But with every step up the ladder, the proportion of women shrinks ... It’s a room full of men discussing women’s health.

Her research interests are in the fields of global health, tropical medicine, and emerging infectious diseases. Taking an approach that crosses disciplines, she aims to take into account the local context of global health issues such as infectious disease. In her work she highlights how areas of global unrest are often centres of emerging disease.

She shared her global and infectious disease expertise during the COVID-19 pandemic beginning in 2020 and has continued to support pandemic preparedness and prevention efforts at Stanford. In 2022, she advised the Centers for Disease Control on how to improve its vast quarantine system to help prevent future pandemics.

== Human and Planetary Health ==
Recognizing the growing and grave threats that climate change and other environmental changes pose to human health, Barry has led many initiatives to help the medical and global health communities respond to these challenges. These include:

- Collaborated with the University of Washington's Center for One Health Research to launch Medicine for a Changing Planet, a series of case studies that highlight various clinical manifestations of environmental challenges – and skills that clinicians can develop to provide effective care for patients on a changing planet.
- Launched the first Human and Planetary Health Postdoctoral Fellowship in partnership with the London School of Hygiene & Tropical Medicine
- Funded, mentored, and contributed to a range of research projects exploring the physical and mental health implications of climate change on human health.
- Supported the development of a Human and Planetary Health program at Stanford.

== Organizations ==
Barry is an elected member of the Council on Foreign Relations since 2019 and National Academy of Sciences since 2002. She sits on the National Academy of Medicine (NAM) Board on Global Health and is a member of the WomenLift Health advisory board. She was elected into ASTMH's first fellows group in 2011 and remains a fellow there.

She is the chair emeritus and was the chair of the board of directors for the Consortium of Universities for Global Health (CUGH) between 2020-22. She served as director-at-large for the Foundation for Advancement of International Medical Education and Research (FAIMER) between 2008-14. She was a member of the Fogarty Center Advisory Board between 2012–17, was president of the American Society of Tropical Medicine and Hygiene between 2001-02, and has served as a member of the Global Health Corps advisory board. In 1993, she chaired the ASTMH Committee for Certification Exam in the United States in Tropical Medicine and Travelers Health.

== Awards ==
Barry has been recognized for her support of the health of refugees and vulnerable populations: In 1981, she received the Humanitarian Award, Migration and Refugee, from Catholic Services. In 1993, she was given the Elm-Ivy Mayor's Award from the New Haven, CT. Mayor's Office for her work on homeless and refugee health.

She has been awarded two teaching awards from Yale University: In 1992, the Leah Lowenstein Award, selected by Yale medical students as a role model for teaching of humane, egalitarian care, and in 2002, the Yale School of Medicine Society Distinguished Teaching Award.

She's also been recognized as a physician, being selected for Best Doctors in America and receiving, in 2010, the Ben Kean Medal, awarded to a clinician or educator for their dedication to clinical tropical medicine.

In 2018 Barry was awarded the Elizabeth Blackwell Medal, a prize awarded annually by the American Medical Women's Association, to a woman physician for her outstanding contribution to the cause of women in medicine.

In 2022, Barry received the Martin S. Wolfe Mentorship award from the American Society of Tropical Medicine and Hygiene, recognizing her efforts to foster a new generation of global health leaders.

In 2023, CUGH honored Barry with the Distinguished Leadership Award, its highest annual honor.

== Personal life ==
Barry is married to physician and former Dean of Research at Stanford School of Medicine, Mark Cullen, and they have two daughters, Zoe B. Cullen, and Esme B. Cullen, and five grandchildren. Zoe B. Cullen is a labor economist at Harvard Business School and Esme B. Cullen is an internist and medical director of a federally qualified clinic in Marin County, California .

== Selected publications ==
- Barry M, Bia F. (1988) "Ethical considerations of human investigation in developing countries: The AIDS dilemma." NEJM. 319 (16):1083-1086 doi:10.1056/NEJM198810203191609
- Barry M. (1991) "The influence of the U.S. tobacco industry on the health, economy, and environment of developing countries" The New England Journal of Medicine. 324 917-920 doi:10.1056/NEJM199103283241311
- Barry M, Molyneux M. (1992) "Ethical dilemmas in malaria drug and vaccine trials: a bioethical perspective." Journal of Medical Ethics. 18 (4): 189–192 doi:10.1136/jme.18.4.189
- Barry M, Armstrong L, Russi M, Dembry L, Geller D, Tesh R, Gonzalez JP, Khan A, Peters CJ. (1995) "Treatment of a Laboratory Acquired Infection of Sabiá Virus." New England Journal of Medicine. 333 (5): 294–296 doi:10.1056/NEJM199508033330505
- Barry, Michèle (2000-01-18). "Effect of the U.S. Embargo and Economic Decline on Health in Cuba". Annals of Internal Medicine. 132 (2): 151. doi:10.7326/0003-4819-132-2-200001180-00010
- Lo, Nathan C.; Barry, Michele (2017-04-13). "The Perils of Trumping Science in Global Health — The Mexico City Policy and Beyond". New England Journal of Medicine. 376 (15): 1399–1401. doi:10.1056/NEJMp1701294
- Jowell, Ashley; Zhou, Bright; Barry, Michele (2017-08-01). "The impact of megacities on health: preparing for a resilient future". The Lancet Planetary Health. 1 (5): e176–e178. doi:10.1016/S2542-5196(17)30080-3
- Wise, Paul H.; Barry, Michele (2017). "Civil War & the Global Threat of Pandemics". Daedalus. 146 (4): 71–84. doi:10.1162/daed_a_00460. ISSN 0011-5266. S2CID 11813735.
- Barry M., Talib Z., Jowell A., Thompson K., Burke K., Larson H., Moyer C., and the Steering Committee of the Women Leaders in Global Health Conference. (2017) "A new vision for global health leadership." The Lancet. 390 (10112): 2536–2537 https://www.thelancet.com/journals/lancet/article/PIIS0140-6736(17)33101-X/fulltext
- Gabster, Brooke Peterson; van Daalen, Kim; Dhatt, Roopa; Barry, Michele (2020-06). "Challenges for the female academic during the COVID-19 pandemic". The Lancet. 395 (10242): 1968–1970. doi:10.1016/S0140-6736(20)31412-4
- Krohn, Kristina M.; Yu, Gina; Lieber, Mark; Barry, Michele (2022-07). "The Stanford Global Health Media Fellowship: Training the Next Generation of Physician Communicators to Fight Health Misinformation". Academic Medicine. 97 (7): 1004–1008. doi:10.1097/ACM.0000000000004630
- Modlin, C.E., DeCamp, M., Barry, M., Rockney, D. and Sugarman, J., (2022) An Online Ethics Curriculum for Short-Term Global Health Experiences: Evaluating a Decade of Use. Annals of Global Health, 88(1), p. 74. DOI: http://doi.org/10.5334/aogh.3716
- Wray, B., Veidis, E. M., Flores, E. C., Phillips, A. A., Alani, O., & Barry, M. (2023). A call to action for gender equity in climate leadership. American Journal of Tropical Medicine and Hygiene, 108(6), 1088–1092. https://doi.org/10.4269/ajtmh.22-0674
