= International Pharmaceutical Students' Federation =

- Formation: 25 August 1949
- Type: International non-governmental organisation
- Headquarters: The Hague
- Location: Netherlands
- Members: 500,000
- Official languages: English, Arabic, French, Spanish
- Website: www.ipsf.org

The International Pharmaceutical Students' Federation (IPSF) is a non-governmental, non-political and non-religious organisation that represents pharmaceutical students, pharmacy students and recent graduates from all over the world. It was founded in 1949 and it is the oldest faculty-based student organisation. IPSF represents over 500,000 individuals in more than 100 countries with 127 different representative pharmacy student member organisations.

Every pharmaceutical student, pharmacy student and recent graduates up to four years after receiving their degree may become a member of the Federation individually, or via a representative organisation of pharmacy students.

The Federation has engaged in the following areas: pharmacy education, public health, professional development, advocacy, cultural awareness, and partnerships developing pharmacists worldwide.

The IPSF Team is entirely student-run and is composed of more than 150 volunteers.

== Introduction ==
IPSF holds official relations with the World Health Organization (WHO) and the United Nations Educational, Scientific and Cultural Organization (UNESCO). IPSF works in close collaboration with the International Pharmaceutical Federation (FIP). The IPSF Secretariat is supported and hosted by FIP in The Hague, The Netherlands.

== History ==
The idea of forming IPSF came in 1948 from then-Secretary of the British Pharmaceutical Students' Association, Stephen B. Challen, during the 6th Annual Congress of BPSA. The Constitution of the Federation was agreed and signed on the 25th of August 1949, during the Inaugural Conference in London, and marking the organisation's founding date. On the same day, Sidney J. Relph, was elected as the first President of IPSF along with 4 other Executive Committee members.

The 8 founding countries were Austria, Australia, Denmark (also voting for Finland, Norway, and Sweden), Iceland, Ireland, Netherlands, Switzerland and United Kingdom.

== Objectives ==
- Provide opportunities for professional development, education, and international exchange.
- Disseminate scientific and professional knowledge.
- Advocate for improvements to pharmaceutical education strategies.
- Encourage the formation and development of national pharmaceutical student organisations without trespassing on their domains.
- Provide a platform for member organisations to exchange knowledge, experience, and ideas.
- Strengthen international dialogue and cooperation of the Federation with students, professionals, and governmental and non-governmental organisations.
- Advocate for improvements to health systems.

== Membership ==
IPSF offers several types of memberships. For organisations, these are:

- Member in organisation (MiA)
- Full Member (FM)

Every organisation wishing to join IPSF must first become a Member in Association.

To become a Full Member, the organisation has had to have been a (MiA) for at least one year while also being nationally representative of pharmacy students in a given country. However, according to IPSF Official Documents, if the national organisation does not wish to attain Full Membership, another organisation of any size from the same country may apply. The application and acceptance procedure is then very much the same as for the MiAs.

IPSF also offers individuals to become part of IPSF on their own, should they so desire. An individual may become one of the following:

- Individual Member (IM)
- Friend of the Federation (FoF)

Individual Membership is reserved for pharmacy and pharmaceutical science students or recent graduates up to four years after graduating from their first degree in pharmacy or pharmaceutical sciences.

On the other hand, any individual who wishes to contribute to the advancement of the aims of the Federation to the best of their capabilities, may become a Friend of the Federation. They are thus considered to be affiliated individuals of the Federation.

Lastly, IPSF also recognises exceptional individuals who have contributed greatly to the status and the goals of the Federation. These are:

- Honorary Life Members (HLM)
- Alumni

Honorary Life Members are elected at the annual IPSF World Congress. They must be nominated by two organisations and must be accepted by the General Assembly.

Alumni are, like Friends of the Federation, affiliated individuals of IPSF. To become an Alumni, the individual has to have been one of the following:

- Past IPSF Team Member
- Past IPSF Member Organisation Contact Person or Student Exchange Officer
- Past IPSF Event attendee

To be recognised as an Alumnus and if the criteria are met, IPSF Membership Coordinator should be contacted by the interested individual to receive the Alumni Form.

== Structure ==
=== Executive committee and committees ===
The IPSF Executive consists of seventeen (17) elected members: President, President-elect, Secretary-General, Treasurer, Chairperson of Public Health, Chairperson of Media and Publications, Chairperson of Pharmacy Education, Chairperson of Professional Development, Chairperson of Internal Relations, Chairperson of External Relations, Chairperson of Student Exchange and five (5) Regional Chairpersons. The Executive also includes one (1) co-opted member: Chairperson of the World Congress Reception Committee. Executive Committee members serve the Federation as volunteers with one Executive member designated as the Permanent Officer to work part-time at the IPSF Headquarters in The Hague, The Netherlands.

IPSF has committees to help and supervise the working of the Executive Committee.

==== Executive Committee 2024 - 2025 ====
- President: Ms. Yifan Zhou (CAPSI, Canada)
- President-Elect: Ms. Mancharee Sangmueang-Skallevold (PSAT, Thailand)
- Secretary General: Ms. Michele Mayuba Rachel (KEPhSA, Kenya)
- Treasurer: Ms. Isabela Stoica (FASFR, Romania)
- Chairperson of External Relations: Mr. Gava Rayshum (EM KMFA UGM, Indonesia)
- Chairperson of Internal Relations: Ms. Dorian Joghataie (IPhSA, Iran)
- Chairperson of Media and Publications: Ms. Mariette Nuzah (CAPSA, Cameroon)
- Chairperson of Pharmacy Education: Ms. Sama Ghozlan (EPSF, Egypt)
- Chairperson of Professional Development: Ms. Angela Judhia Arkandhi (BEM KMFA UGM, Indonesia)
- Chairperson of Public Health: Ms. Tanushree Jain (IPGA-SF, India)
- Chairperson of Student Exchange: Mr. Souheib Kirat (ASEPA, Algeria)
- Chairperson of the African Regional Office: Mr. Sano Samuel (RPSA, Rwanda)
- Chairperson of the Asia Pacific Regional Office: Mr. Moises Carta (FJCPPhA, Philippines)
- Chairperson of the Eastern Mediterranean Regional Office: Mr. Taha Hawari (LPSA, Lebanon)
- Chairperson of the European Regional Office: Ms. Maria Livramento (APEF, Portugal)
- Chairperson of the Pan American Regional Office: Ms. Marissa El Hajje (FEBRAF, Brazil)
- Chairperson of the Reception Committee of the 70th IPSF World Congress, Nairobi - Kenya: Mr. Silvanus Manyala (KEPhSA, Kenya)

=== Regional Offices ===
The IPSF Regional Office is a functional extension of the IPSF Executive structured by elected pharmacy students from IPSF member countries of a specific IPSF region, forming Regional Working Group. Its mission shall be to advance and support the aims and objectives of the Federation at regional level.

- African Regional Office (AfRO) – Established in 2008
- Asia Pacific Regional Office (APRO) – Established in 1999
- Eastern Mediterranean Regional Office (EMRO) – Established in 2008
- European Regional Office (EuRO) – Established in 2013
- Pan American Regional Office (PARO) – Established in 1999

=== General Assembly ===
The main activity of the World Congress is the General Assembly, where the elections of the Executive Committee happen, approval of reports, changes to the Official Documents, and any matter from the members or Executive Committee take place.

== IPSF World Congresses ==
- 1948 – Preparatory meeting, London, Great Britain
- 1949 – 1st Conference, London, Great Britain
- 1951 – 2nd Conference, Copenhagen, Denmark
- 1952 – 1st Study Tour, London, Great Britain
- 1953 – 3rd Conference, Leiden, The Netherlands
- 1954 – 2nd Study Tour, Frankfurt, Germany
- 1955 – 4th Conference, Vienna, Austria
- 1956 – 3rd Study Tour, Dubrovnik, Yugoslavia
- 1957 – 5th Congress, Mosney, Ireland
- 1958 – 4th Study Tour, Strasbourg, France
- 1959 – 6th Congress, Noordwijk, The Netherlands
- 1960 – 5th Study Tour, Stockholm, Sweden
- 1961 – 7th Congress, Munich, Germany
- 1962 – 8th Congress, Barcelona, Spain
- 1963 – 9th Congress, London, Great Britain
- 1964 – 10th Congress, Istanbul, Turkey
- 1965 – 11th Congress, Bray, Ireland
- 1966 – 12th Congress, Vienna, Austria
- 1967 – 13th Congress, Madrid, Spain
- 1968 – 14th Congress, Scheveningen, The Netherlands
- 1969 – 15th Congress, Istanbul, Turkey
- 1970 – 16th Congress, Berlin, Germany
- 1971 – 17th Congress, Elsinore, Denmark
- 1972 – 18th Congress, Jerusalem, Israel
- 1973 – 19th Congress, Paris, France
- 1974 – 20th Congress, Cape Town, South Africa
- 1975 – 21st Congress, Helsinki, Finland
- 1976 – 22nd Congress, Vienna, Austria
- 1977 – 23rd Congress, Mexico City, Mexico
- 1978 – 24th Congress, Edinburgh, Scotland
- 1979 – 25th Congress, Valletta, Malta
- 1980 – 26th Congress, Madrid, Spain
- 1981 – 27th Congress, Belfast, Northern Ireland
- 1982 – 28th Congress, Sigtuna, Sweden
- 1983 – 29th Congress, Lausanne, Switzerland
- 1984 – 30th Congress, Alexandria, Egypt
- 1985 – 31st Congress, Noordwijk, The Netherlands
- 1986 – 32nd Congress, Panama City, Panama
- 1987 – 33rd Congress, Jerusalem, Israel
- 1988 – 34th Congress, Nottingham, Great Britain
- 1989 – 35th Congress, Philadelphia, USA
- 1990 – 36th Congress, Vienna, Austria
- 1991 – 37th Congress, Bahar ic-Caghaq, Malta
- 1992 – 38th Congress, Lisbon, Portugal
- 1993 – 39th Congress, Cape Town, South Africa
- 1994 – 40th Congress, Tegucigalpa, Honduras
- 1995 – 41st Congress, Accra, Ghana
- 1996 – 42nd Congress, Hradec Kralove, Czech Republic
- 1997 – 43rd Congress, Vancouver, Canada
- 1998 – 44th Congress, Helsinki, Finland
- 1999 – 45th Congress, London, Great Britain
- 2000 – 46th Congress, San Salvador, El Salvador
- 2001 – 47th Congress, Cairo, Egypt
- 2002 – 48th Congress, Budapest, Hungary
- 2003 – 49th Congress, Singapore
- 2004 – 50th Congress, Halifax, Canada
- 2005 – 51st Congress, Bonn, Germany
- 2006 – 52nd Congress, Cairns, Australia
- 2007 – 53rd Congress, Taipei, Taiwan
- 2008 – 54th Congress, Cluj-Napoca, Romania
- 2009 – 55th Congress, Bali, Indonesia
- 2010 – 56th Congress, Ljubljana, Slovenia
- 2011 – 57th Congress, Hat Yai, Thailand
- 2012 – 58th Congress, Hurghada, Egypt
- 2013 – 59th Congress, Utrecht, The Netherlands
- 2014 – 60th Congress, Porto, Portugal
- 2015 – 61st Congress, Hyderabad, India
- 2016 – 62nd Congress, Harare, Zimbabwe
- 2017 – 63rd Congress, Taipei, Taiwan
- 2018 – 64th Congress, Mendoza, Argentina
- 2019 - 65th Congress, Kigali, Rwanda
- 2021 - 66th Congress, Seoul, South Korea (Virtual)
- 2022 - 67th Congress, Hurghada, Egypt
- 2023 - 68th Congress, Bali, Indonesia
- 2024 - 69th Congress, Seoul, Korea
- 2025 - 70th Congress, Nairobi, Kenya

== Projects ==
The Federation runs several projects during the year, mainly on Pharmacy Education, Professional Development, Public Health and on Student Exchange. Some of those projects are made and implemented by IPSF alone, and others depend on the active participation of member organisations.

=== Pharmacy Education (PE) ===
The Pharmacy Education Portfolio focuses on promoting and developing pharmacy education worldwide, a critical objective of the Federation. A key partner of this portfolio in helping meet its objectives is FIPEd (FIP Education Initiative). The main projects are:

==== Publications ====
The Pharmacy Education Portfolio has two main publications:

- Pharmacy Education Newsletter (PEN) – It is the Pharmacy Education Featurette of the IPSF Newsletter. Containing updates from the portfolio and articles from students and professionals related to pharmacy education around the world.
- Phuture – It is the scientific publication of IPSF with to promote research by providing a platform for students and graduates to publish research articles, abstracts, reviews and commentaries.

==== Competitions ====
The main competitions include the Poster Competition, held during IPSF Official Events, and the Critical Essay competition, held in collaboration with FIPed. Information regarding the posters, such as size, format and subject are shared with the Contact Persons and in the call for abstracts prior the event. This information will also be made available on the IPSF website.

==== Research ====
The Pharmacy Education Portfolio undertakes various research projects. The opportunities may be for direct involvement or for collaborating on sharing and promoting the project.

==== Internships ====
The Federation releases calls for Internships with several partners, such as the World Health Organization, International Federation of Pharmaceutical Manufacturers and Associations, International Pharmaceutical Federation among others. These calls are shared with the Contact Persons and with IPSF students through the website and the Facebook Page. Each call may contain different criteria, as criteria pertains to the specific internship.

=== Professional Development (PD) ===
IPSF is committed to ensuring quality pharmacy education and promoting the role of the pharmacist. Professional Development involves the process of active participation in formal and informal learning activities that assist individuals in developing and maintaining continuing competence, enhancing their professional practice, supporting the achievements of their career goals, and optimising health outcomes as an integral member of the health professional team.

Through professional skills workshops and competitions, pharmacy awareness campaigns and leadership training opportunities, IPSF strives to enhance the knowledge, skills, attitudes and values required by pharmacy professionals and students for their future practice.

==== Patient Counseling Event (PCE) ====
The Patient Counselling Event (PCE) aims to demonstrate the importance of communication and counselling skills for pharmacists, increase the awareness of pharmacists as public educators, and encourage and promote the development of the pharmacy profession through an expanded scope of practice.

IPSF held their first Patient Counselling Event at a congress in 1989 and today, the PCE is held at every IPSF World Congress, IPSF Regional Symposia and by many of our member organisations under the Professional Development portfolio. The main objectives for the Patient Counselling Event are to promote training in communication skills, provide an opportunity for pharmacy students and pharmacists to learn how to effectively interact with patients, determine and address any drug therapy problems, and educate patients on many medications and disease states in a fun and competitive environment.

==== Clinical Skills Event (CSE) ====
The IPSF Clinical Skills Event (CSE) provides educational opportunities for members from across the globe to enhance and demonstrate their clinical pharmaceutical knowledge. The purpose of this event is to increase pharmacy students' awareness of the importance of the pharmacist's role in direct patient care. Individuals and teams compete by demonstrating their skills in assessing patient information and current therapy, identifying and prioritising drug therapy problems, identifying treatment goals, and recommending a pharmaceutical care plan.

This activity is an interactive, individual or team-based analysis of clinical scenarios for hospital/health-system pharmacists and is open to all students ranging from first year students to recent graduates.

==== Compounding Event (CE) ====
The Compounding Event (CE) was created to highlight the importance and the necessity of compounding skills within the pharmacy profession, especially as we are moving towards personalised medicine in health care. This event was first introduced at the 59th IPSF World Congress in Utrecht, the Netherlands in 2013. The Compounding Event has four main objectives:

1. To raise awareness about the importance of compounding within the pharmacy profession and quality/security measures regarding the production of compounded pharmaceutical products
2. To teach students to recognise that certain patients may have the need for individualised pharmaceutical preparations that may not be readily available
3. To provide students with an opportunity to develop their knowledge in designing and preparing compounded pharmaceutical formulations
4. To provide pharmacy students with an opportunity to practice their compounding skills in an environment that is conducive to learning

The CE generally has two levels of difficulty — beginner and advanced — and typically begins with an introductory workshop. Following the workshop, students will be given a case and will be challenged to determine the best method to compound the formulation and prepare a finished product.

Marketing Skills Event/Industrial Skills Event (MSE/ISE)

These are the newest development events which created for first time in 2018 to highlight the importance of these skills and open eyes of pharmacy students on these fields.

==== Pharmacy Profession Awareness Campaign (PPAC) ====
The Pharmacy Profession Advocacy Campaign (PPAC) is aimed at educating the public, policy makers, and other health care professionals about the role pharmacists play as an integral part of the health care team. It aims to provide insight on the daily functions of pharmacists from various sectors, and to promote awareness of the pharmacy profession at all levels, from students and recent graduates, to the general public.

==== Leaders In Training (LIT) ====
The IPSF Leaders in Training program aims to impart the necessary leadership and management skills important for taking up professional roles in the future. The main objective of the LIT program is to equip participants with the skills needed to effectively take on roles of responsibility within the Federation as well as in their professional career. These include global roles in health issues, policy making and the pharmacy profession itself.

From the point of a sustainable all round development of personality, Leaders in Training tries to impart skills such as general leadership responsibilities, strategic planning, project management, teamwork, time management, communication and public speaking, advocacy, etc.

The training is delivered by IPSF's Certified Trainers, as well as members of the IPSF Executive Committee to ensure enough acquaintance to IPSF. The Leaders in Training program is held every year prior to the IPSF World Congress in addition to some of the IPSF Regional Symposia and also locally within some of our Member Organisations.

==== Trainers Development Camp (TDC) ====
The IPSF Trainers Development Camp aims to develop a high quality and sustainable training program for pharmaceutical students and recent graduates worldwide. To maintain our leadership programs to an exceptional standard and provide sustainable future leadership within IPSF, we need to produce quality trainers to pass down this information. The IPSF TDC provides participants with a background on experience-based learning and equips them with the necessary skills set to prepare and conduct training sessions. IPSF certified trainers are then able to deliver training sessions and workshops within the Leaders in Training program and other educational events (IPSF Regional Symposia, IPSF World Congress, etc.).

=== Public Health (PH) ===
IPSF strives to engage Member Organisations in initiatives that positively influence health and health knowledge within their communities. The Federation plays an active role in promoting and implementing Public Health activities and its work is greatly aided by its collaboration with the World Health Organization (WHO). The Federation currently holds six focuses, divided into Health Awareness, Medicine Awareness, and Humanitarian categories.

==== Health Awareness Section ====
===== HIV/AIDS Awareness Campaign =====
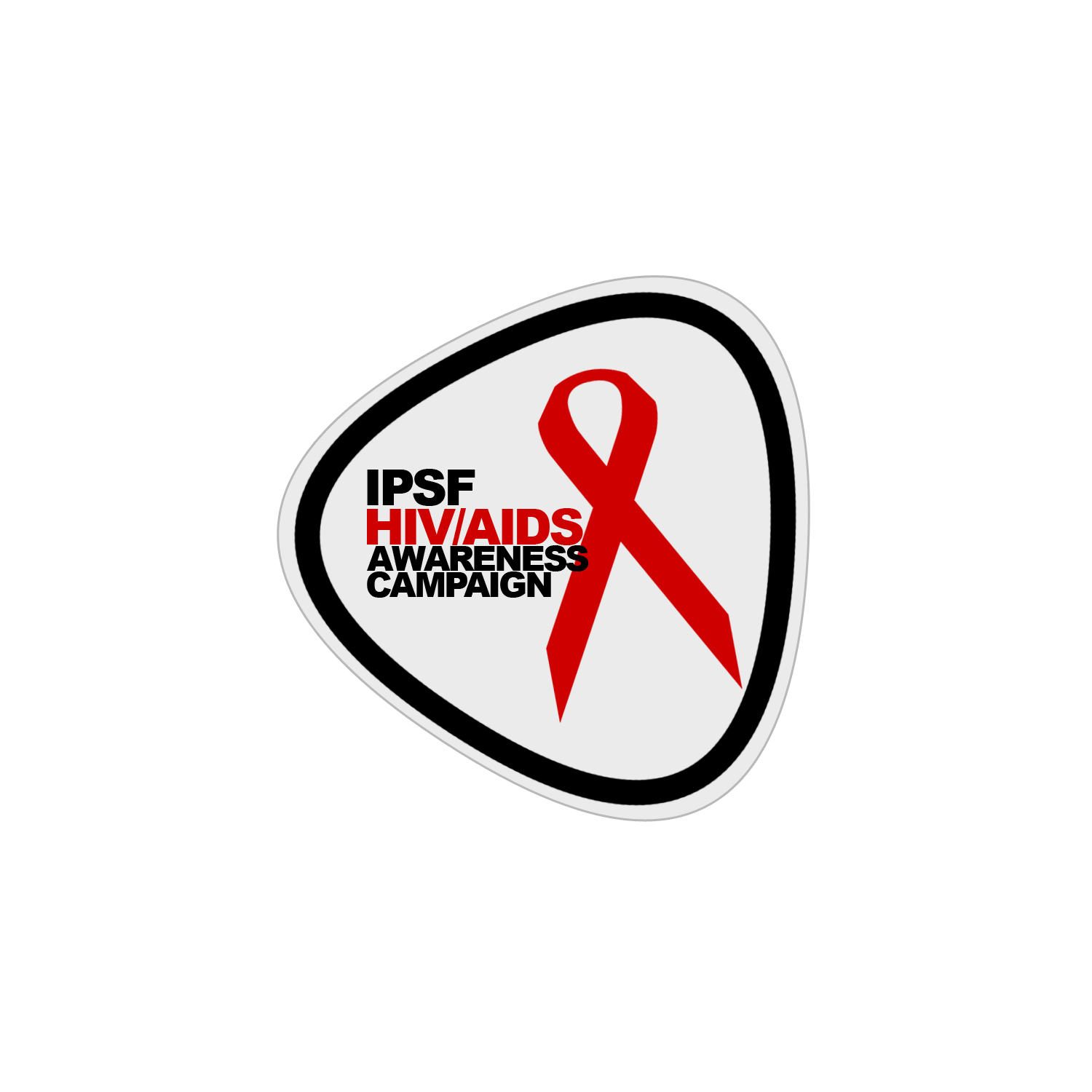
HIV/AIDS Campaign Logo

In 1987, the World Health Organization (WHO) dedicated December 1 to raise awareness for of HIV and for the AIDS pandemic. As a partner of WHO, IPSF organisations across the globe organise every year an HIV/AIDS campaign aimed at spreading awareness about HIV, how it is transmitted as well as the methods of prevention.

===== Tobacco Alert Campaign =====
Along with its partner, the WHO, IPSF celebrates World Tobacco Day on the 31 May. On this day, IPSF members educate their society about the consequences of consuming tobacco and its derivatives. The goal of the Tobacco Alert campaign, is to make young individuals aware of the dangers of tobacco and involve them in the fight against it in order to decrease the use of tobacco.

===== Healthy Living and Diabetes Campaign =====
The Diabetes and Healthy Living Campaign, launched in August 2005, aims to raise awareness of a healthy lifestyle in order to prevent and control diabetes and to encourage pro-active rather than reactive health habits. To celebrate World Diabetes Day on November 14, IPSF motivates its organisations to collaborate with interdisciplinary organisations from different health care practitioners in order to plan the campaign. During the campaign, IPSF members put their knowledge into practice in order to inform people about diabetes and the risk factors that can accelerate and the steps that can be taken to limit the development and progression of the disease. As part of this Campaign, IPSF participates in Healthy Living activities on World Health Day each April 7. In 1950, the World Health Organisation's assembly declared April 7 as World Health Day to commemorate the first World Health Assembly that happened on that same day in 1948. This was to honour the founding of the World Health Organization and to raise worldwide attention to its global health campaigns.

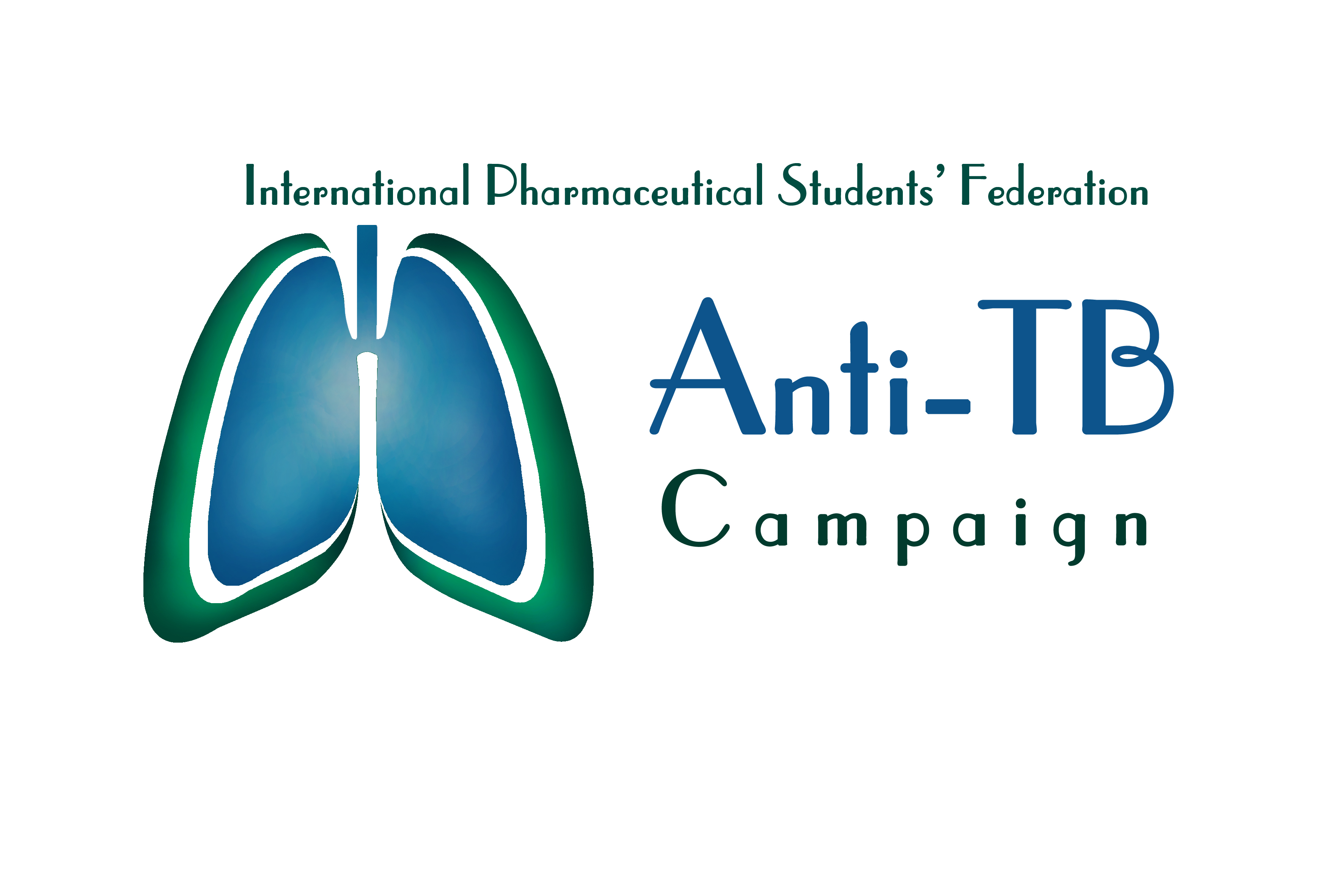
IPSF Anti-TB Campaign Logo

===== Tuberculosis Awareness Campaign =====
In 1996, the WHO joined hands with the International Union Against Tuberculosis and Lung Disease (IUATLD). In 2000, the Stop TB Partnership was formed by network of organisations and countries in order to fight against tuberculosis (TB). The goal of this partnership is to eradicate TB by 2050. IPSF organizes initiatives and strongly advocates for this campaign in order to raise awareness about tuberculosis. On March 24, the official world TB day, multiple IPSF organisations organise a TB awareness campaign in their home countries, where they share their knowledge as pharmacists and as pharmacy students and educate the population on the dangers of tuberculosis.

==== Medicine Awareness Section ====
===== Anti-Counterfeit Drug Campaign =====
According to a WHO announcement, the existence of substandard, spurious, falsely labelled, falsified and counterfeit (SSFFC) medical products is an unacceptable risk to public health.

The Anti-Counterfeit Drug Campaign (ACDC) works towards helping healthcare students create advocacy campaigns in their countries to help combat the problems of counterfeit and substandard medications. IPSF in collaboration with other stakeholders and organisations tends to act against the unlimited growing of fake medicines by raising awareness and advocacy actions.

===== Medicine Awareness Campaign =====
The Medicine Awareness Campaign's goal is to improve awareness among healthcare students and other students about medications in different aspects. In this portfolio subjects such as Antimicrobial resistance (AMR), rational use of medicines, drug abuse, drug disposal and any other issues related to medication are addressed.

A related campaign is the "Drug disposal campaign", in which IPSF focusses on the effect of unstandardized methods of drug disposal in the environment. It encourages its participants to raise awareness of healthcare systems, advocacy campaigns and events for drug disposal in community pharmacies.

==== Humanitarian section ====
===== Vampire Cup =====
Launched in 2011, the Vampire Cup is an international blood donation competition among all IPSF organisations. By participating in the Vampire Cup, members are motivated to compete in inter organisational competitions, to promote international relationships, and most importantly to save lives. There are two competitions: the Regular Vampire Cup and the Live Vampire Cup. In both cases, the organisations need to submit a registration form and a tracker form by the given deadlines. The Live Vampire Cup occurs on specific days decided by the IPSF team. Traditionally, the days chosen are around World Blood Donor Day, June 14.

==== Advocacy activities ====
===== Executive Board Meeting =====
The WHO Executive Board has 34 members with technical qualifications that are designated by Member States and are elected to serve by the World Health Assembly. The main functions of the Board are to implement the decisions and policies of the Assembly, and to advise and facilitate its work.

During the month of January, the Executive Board discusses and agrees to the agenda for the Assembly, and to adopt resolutions which will be considered during the Assembly.

Every year, representatives from IPSF attend the Executive Board Meeting to identify what priority issues will be discussed and to determine where IPSF can contribute in the development of interventions. It is also through this opportunity that IPSF builds connections with different Member State actors.

===== World Health Assembly =====
The World Health Assembly (WHA) is the decision-making body of the World Health Organization. It is annually attended by delegations from all WHO Member States, as well as Non-State Actors. It focuses on the specific health agenda prepared by the Executive Board.

The main functions of the WHA are:

- To determine the policies of the Organisation;
- To appoint the Director-General;
- To supervise financial policies;
- To review and approve the proposed programme budget.

Every year, IPSF calls for its members to be part of its delegation to attend the WHA during the month of May in Geneva, Switzerland. The selected members are then oriented and trained on how they can actively participate and effectively engage in deliberations, discussions and events, in order for IPSF to establish new partnerships and sustain existing connections with various stakeholders, and to develop collaborative projects and programs.

=== Student Exchange Programme ===
Student Exchange Programme (SEP) is IPSF's largest project, offering professional pharmacy internships. Every year, more than 900 students from around the world are given the opportunity to experience the practice of pharmacy in any one of the 65 participating countries.

The Student Exchange Programme therefore enables a cultural exchange between pharmacy students around the world by sharing knowledge and experiences.

The 74 member Organisations of IPSF involved in SEP organise the exchanges by finding host sites where the students are trained. The programme runs throughout the year (Winter version and Summer version), but the majority of the exchanges take place between May and September.

The duration is usually 1 to 3 months with a minimum of 60 working hours per exchange. Possible host sites include:

- Community pharmacy;
- Hospital pharmacy;
- Clinical pharmacy;
- Wholesale pharmacy;
- Pharmaceutical industry;
- Research at a university;
- Government or private health agencies.

The host may also provide room, board and/or pocket money in addition to the training site in order to help the applicant.

The SEP is organised by:

- Chairperson of Student Exchange
- Student Exchange Committee
- Student Exchange Officers (SEOs): The Student Exchange Officers represent their organisation that is a member of IPSF. The Student Exchange Officers are responsible for arranging host sites and accommodation for the incoming students and finding places for the outgoing students by contacting other SEOs.
- Local Exchange Officers (LEOs): In some countries, where the National organisation is formed by Local organisations, the SEO shares the work with one or more Local Exchange Officers.
- Every pharmacy student and recent graduates (up to four years after their graduation) can join SEP through an IPSF Member organisation or as Individual Member, when not eligible to their IPSF Member organisation.

== Events ==
The Official Events of the Federation are the World Congress and the Regional Symposia – They happen yearly and are defined two years in advance and they do not overlap. The full costs for participating in the IPSF events are on the participant (Tickets and registration fee).

The Registration Fee is defined by the host, and it cannot be more than 55 euros per day.

The host, after being elected at the General Assembly or Regional Assembly, appoints a Reception Committee (RC) – A committee that will be in charge of organising the event, along with the Executive Committee. Before the event, the RC can appoint a Helping Committee (HC) to add human resources to help complete the work.

The head of the organisation, the “Chairperson of World Congress/Regional Symposium” is co-opted in the Executive Committee/Regional Working Group for the term of the office in which the event will be held.

Other annex events that may be held at the World Congress or Regional Symposium are the Leaders in Training and the Post Congress Tour.

=== World Congress ===
The World Congress is the main event of the Federation and it usually lasts for 10 days. It has been held annually since 1961. The first conference was in London, United Kingdom, in 1949 and the first congress happened in Mosney, Ireland, in 1957.

The first World Congress held outside of Europe was in the African Regional Office in Cape Town, South Africa, in 1974. The Pan American Regional Office then hosted their first congress in Mexico City, Mexico, in 1977. The Eastern Mediterranean Region followed with in Alexandria, Egypt, in 1984. The Asia Pacific Regional Office then hosted their first congress in Singapore in 2003.

Every World Congress hosts these events and activities:

- Official Opening Ceremony
- General Assembly
- Workshops
- Symposia of scientific and educational nature
- Committee meetings

The main activity of the World Congress is the General Assembly, which holds the elections of the Executive Committee, the approval of reports, the changes to the official documents and the other various matters of the members or Executive Committee.

=== Regional Symposia ===
Today, all Regional Offices organise an annual Regional Symposium, which usually last for 7 days.

- African Regional Office – African Pharmaceutical Symposium (AfPS)
- Asia Pacific Regional Office – Asia Pacific Pharmaceutical Symposium (APPS)
- Eastern Mediterranean Regional Office – Eastern Mediterranean Pharmaceutical Symposium (EMPS)
- European Regional Office – European Regional Symposium (EuRS)
- Pan American Regional Office – Pan American Regional Symposium (PARS)

The only mandatory activities of the Regional Symposia are the Regional Assemblies. However, they usually resemble the World Congress.

== IPSF Grants and Development Fund ==
IPSF awards a number of grants throughout the year to help ensure that students and member organisations can fully participate in IPSF events despite financial barriers.

Four types of grants are awarded over the year. Two are for by member organisations and two are for individual student members. Grants are awarded based on the submitted applications and the review by the IPSF Treasurer, the Development Fund Coordinator and the Development Fund Committee.

=== Membership Grant ===
The Membership Grant is made available to Full Member organisations and to Members in Association who have been members of IPSF for at least one year. Any such organisation facing financial difficulties, if awarded a grant, may have their annual membership fees waived for the year.

An organisation can only apply for the Membership Grant twice every three years. If awarded, the organisation is expected to complete at least one IPSF project, excluding SEP, in the 12 months following the receipt of the grant. In addition, the organisation is expected to submit an article to be published in an IPSF publication.

=== Project Grant ===
The Project Grant is made available to Full Member Organisations and Members in Association planning to undertake a project or campaign and could benefit from financial assistance.

Appropriate projects are not strictly defined, but they should benefit the members of the applying organisation or the public, and should be relevant to a current IPSF campaign or project.

=== Event Grant ===
The Event Grant is designed to better allow pharmacy students facing financial barriers to attend an IPSF event. Students intending to attend the IPSF World Congress or one of the Regional Symposia should submit an application to the Development Fund Committee.

The criteria for a successful application generally focuses on financial need including, but not limited to, cost of travel, visa, registration fee, personal resources, and World Bank economic classification of applying member's country.

=== SEP Grant ===
The objective of the Student Exchange Grant is to allow pharmacy students with limited financial resources the opportunity to participate in the IPSF Student Exchange Programme.

The SEP Grant may cover part of the travel expenses (bus, train or plane tickets) from the applicant's home country to the country in which the exchange occurs and the SEP fee. The maximum monetary value of the grant is approximately 1000 euros and if the actual costs incurred are less than the awarded grant, only the amount of the actual costs will be paid.

The grant will be paid only after completion of the exchange and the submission of the required documents. In addition, the applicant's student exchange fee will be returned to the respective member organisation or to the applicant, in the case of an individual membership.

Eligible candidates must be currently studying for their pharmacy undergraduate degree (first pharmacy degree) or must be a recent graduate of their first pharmacy degree (up to four years after the date of their graduation). An applicant may be an IPSF member through an IPSF Member Organisation (Full Member or Member in Association) or as an Individual Member (currently undergraduate or recent graduate of their first pharmacy degree).

== Partners ==
=== Professional organisations ===
- United Nations (UN) – The UN is an international organisation founded in 1945 and its mission and work are guided by the purposes and principles contained in its founding Charter. The UN is currently made up of 193 Member States. The Economic and Social Council (ECOSOC) is one of the principal organs of the United Nations, and serves as a central platform for reflection, debate, and innovative thinking on sustainable development. Though IPSF holds privileges to be involved and informed in other Specialised Agencies, the Federation is primarily involved with the following:
  - United Nations Educational, Scientific, and Cultural Organisation (UNESCO) – The UNESCO is a specialised agency of the UN. Its purpose is to contribute to peace and security by promoting international collaboration through education, science, and culture to further universal respect for justice, the rule of law, and human rights along with fundamental freedom proclaimed in the United Nations Charter.
  - World Health Organization (WHO) – WHO is a specialised agency of the UN, based in Geneva, that is concerned with international public health. WHO supports countries as they coordinate the efforts of multiple sectors of governments and partners to attain their health objectives and support their national health policies and strategies.
- International Pharmaceutical Federation (FIP) – FIP is a non-governmental organisation that works to support the development of the pharmacy profession, through practice and emerging scientific innovations, in order to meet the world's health care needs and expectations.
  - Education Initiative (FIPEd) – FIPed, the new umbrella directorate encompassing FIP Education Initiative, is bringing together all of FIP's education actions; strengthening our projects and our partnerships with the World Health Organization and with UNESCO.
  - Academic Pharmacy Section – The FIP Academic Pharmacy Section promotes pharmacy education worldwide and contributes to the development of fruitful activities on teaching methodology, student and faculty exchange programs, and policy development on education and training of pharmacists and pharmacy support staff.
  - Health Information Section – The Health and Medicines Information Section was founded in Rome in 1951. The section offers a forum to share knowledge about information issues relating to pharmacy, medicines, diseases and health, including public health, a networking between groups between the health information groups and healthcare professionals, and opportunities to enhance public health.
  - Young Pharmacists' Group (YPG) – The Young Pharmacists' Group (YPG) was officially established as a network of FIP in 2001. The aim of YPG is to encourage young pharmacists to get actively involved in international pharmacy and within the sections and organisation of FIP.
- Alliance for Health Promotion (A4HP) – The A4HP was created in 1997 in order to improve the health and development of all people by building a collective NGO voice and strengthen advocacy, policy and action in the promotion and protection of health..
- Fight the Fakes – Fight the Fakes seeks to build a global movement of organisations and individuals that will shine light on the negative impact and seek to reduce the negative consequences that fake medicines have on individuals worldwide.
- International Federation of Pharmaceutical Manufacturers & Associations (IFPMA) – IFPMA represents the research-based pharmaceutical industry, including the biotechnology and vaccine sectors.
- NGO forum for Health – The NGO Forum for Health is a Geneva-based consortium of health organisations, committed to promoting human rights and quality care in global health. Our origins lie in the 1978 Alma Ata Conference on Primary Health Care. The Forum takes a rights-based approach to making health for all a reality with a focus on networking, information exchange and advocacy.

=== Student and youth organisations ===
- International Federation of Medical Students Associations (IFMSA)
- International Association of Dental Students (IADS)
- International Veterinary Students' Association (IVSA)
- Informal Forum for International Student Organisations (IFISO)
- World Health Students' Alliance (WHSA)
- World Healthcare Students' Symposium (WHSS)
- European Pharmaceutical Students' Association (EPSA)
