= Claire Bayntun =

Physician in global public health

- Born: Claire Elizabeth Bayntun; 1975/1976
- Education: University of York; School of Oriental and African Studies; University of the Arts London; Imperial College London; University of London
- Occupation: Public health physician
- Medical career
- Institutions: London School of Hygiene & Tropical Medicine
- Sub-specialties: Public health

Claire Elizabeth Bayntun (born c. 1975/1976) is an English physician specialised in global public health, director of Global Leadership Programmes, assistant professor at the London School of Hygiene & Tropical Medicine, advisor on health security and health protection, and trained mentor who coaches health leaders. She is vice-president of the Royal Society of Medicine, London.

Bayntun has worked with the World Health Organization (WHO) Collaborating Centres and as a regional NGO Manager in West Africa, where she contributed to efforts in the Ebola crisis including leading the evaluation of the response of Médecins Sans Frontières in Sierra Leone. In 2018, she was one of the speakers at the second Women Leaders in Global Health Conference.

== Education ==
Claire Bayntun spent time in her early life in over 50 countries. She gained her qualifications in psychology from the University of York, followed by a master's in the political economy of development, conflict and human rights from the School of Oriental and African Studies in London. She has a postgraduate diploma in international photojournalism from the University of the Arts London. Later, she completed a master's in public health from Imperial College London, and medicine from the University of London.

== Career ==
In 2005, her paper "What Are We Capable of? The Motivations of Perpetrators in South Africa during the Apartheid Era" explored the accounts of perpetrators who committed violent, politically-motivated acts against others in South Africa during the apartheid era.

Her systematic review in 2012 revealed that the "holistic health system approach" to managing disasters had not been established or evaluated, despite being supported by a resolution passed by the 64th WHO's World Health Assembly the previous year. Lessons and relevant experience learnt from disasters had not always been gathered effectively and were sometimes even forgotten.

She has worked with the WHO Collaborating Centres and as a regional NGO Manager in West Africa, where she contributed to efforts in the Ebola crisis, and supported the development of frontline services. In 2016, she led an independent report for the Médecins Sans Frontières Operational Centre Geneva Response to the Ebola Outbreak in Sierra Leone. With regards to community engagement in the ebola response, she noted that previous histories of invasion, violence and exploitation remained in people's memories and the presence of military workers assisting health workers in biohazard suits would have reinforced fears during the ebola crisis.

Bayntun has worked at the Trauma Centre in Johannesburg General Hospital, South Africa, and led projects for the United Nations and Chatham House, where she is a consultant in global health security. She advises Public Health England, where she contributes to strengthening health protection systems through African national public health institutions. She is an examiner for the Diploma in the Medical Care of Catastrophes at the Worshipful Society of Apothecaries, vice-president of the Royal Society of Medicine, London, advisor on health protection, and a coach for health leaders. She directs Global Leadership Programmes and is assistant professor at the London School of Hygiene & Tropical Medicine.

In 2018, she was one of the global women leader speakers at the second Women Leaders in Global Health Conference, an event she describes as "a movement in the current time".

== Personal and family ==
To be able to continue her role full-time, her husband, a paediatrician, took to working part-time when they had their first child.

== Selected publications ==
- Bayntun, Claire (1 January 2005). "What Are We Capable Of? The Motivations of Perpetrators in South Africa during the Apartheid Era". Medicine, Conflict and Survival. 21 (1): 3–18. doi:10.1080/1362369042000315023. ISSN 1362-3699. PMID 15690623. S2CID 35329601.
- Bayntun, Claire (22 August 2012). "A health system approach to all-hazards disaster management: A systematic review". PLOS Currents. 4 e50081cad5861d. doi:10.1371/50081cad5861d (inactive 1 July 2025). ISSN 2157-3999. PMC 3461969. PMID 23066519.
- Bayntun, Claire; Houlihan, Catherine; Edmunds, John (18 October 2014). "Ebola crisis: beliefs and behaviours warrant urgent attention". The Lancet. 384 (9952): 1424. doi:10.1016/S0140-6736(14)61856-0. ISSN 0140-6736. PMID 25390320. S2CID 39140364.
- Bayntun, Claire; Zimble, Stuart Alexander (April 2016)."Evaluation of the OCG Response to the Ebola Outbreak"; Lessons learned from the Freetown Ebola Treatment Unit, Sierra Leone. OCG/International Board Medecins sans Frontieres. Vienna Evaluation Unit
