= Egyptian Pharmaceutical Students' Federation =

Egyptian Pharmaceutical students' Federation
- Formation: 1982
- Type: NGO student organization student exchange
- Headquarters: Cairo, Egypt
- Members: 38 Associations
- Official language: English, and Arabic
- Parent organization: IPSF
- Volunteers: 5.000
- Website: www.epsfeg.org

The Egyptian Pharmaceutical Students' Federation (EPSF) (Arabic|الاتحاد المصري لطلاب الصيدلة) is an independent student organization representing about 85,000 pharmacy students in 38 pharmacy schools all over Egypt. It works under the supervision of the Egyptian Pharmacist Syndicate, the national FIP member. Since 1982 EPSF has also been a Full Member organization representing Egypt in the International Pharmaceutical Students' Federation.

== History ==
EPSF was initially established in January 1982 with six pharmacy schools:

- Alexandria University
- Assiut University
- Al-Azhar University
- Cairo University
- Tanta University
- Zagazig University

EPSF become a Full Member in IPSF in August 1982, in Sweden during the 28th IPSF congress.

== Members ==
Today EPSF is represented by pharmacy associations in 38 different pharmacy schools in Egypt:

Members
Full name	University	Establishment date
EPSF - AAST	Arab Academy for Science and Technology	2019
EPSF - ACU	Ahram Canadian University	2010
EPSF - ANU	Alexandria National University	2024
EPSF - ASU	Ain Shams University	2018
EPSF - Alexandria	Alexandria University	11/11/2011
EPSF - Assuit	Assuit University	1982
EPSF - AUG	Al Azhar University for Girls	2010
EPSF - Azhar	Al Azhar University	1980
EPSF - Azhar Assuit	Al Azhar University in Assuit	2003
EPSF - Beni Suef	Beni Suef University	1998
EPSF - BUC	Badr University in Cairo	14/2/2015
EPSF - BUE	British University in Egypt	2013
EPSF - Cairo	Cairo University	2010
EPSF - Damanhour	Damanhour University	7/9/2013
EPSF - Delta	Delta University	2012
EPSF - DUM	Deraya University	17/9/2015
EPSF - El Saleheya Gadida	El Saleheya El Gadida University	2020
EPSF - ERU	Egyptian Russian University	2008
EPSF - Fayoum	Fayoum University	2018
EPSF - Heliopolis	Heliopolis University	2013
EPSF - Helwan	Helwan university	2009
EPSF - HUE	Horous University in Egypt	2018
EPSF - KFS	Kafrelsheikh University	2013
EPSF - Mansoura	Mansoura University	1992
EPSF - Menoufia	MenoUfia University	21/8/2017
EPSF - Minia	Minia University	1998
EPSF - MSA	University for Modern Sciences and Arts	2011
EPSF - MTI	Modern University for Technology and Information	2011
EPSF - MUST	Misr University for Science and Technology	09/4/2009
EPSF - NUB	Nahda University in Beni-Suef	2009
EPSF - O6U	October 6 University	2010
EPSF - Port Said	Port Said University	2020
EPSF - Sadat	Sadat University	2018
EPSF - SCU	Suez Canal University	2000
EPSF - Sinai	Sinai University	2010
EPSF - Sohag	Sohag University	2014
EPSF - SUE	Alsalam University in Egypt	2026
EPSF - SVU	South Valley University	2018
EPSF - Tanta	Tanta University	1981
EPSF - Zagazig	Zagazig University	1982

== Structure ==
EPSF consists of the General assembly and the executive board. Each association is represented in the General assembly and has the right to vote according to provisions of the EPSF constitution, which gives the right of voting to the Full members only.

== General Assembly (GA) ==
The GA is the highest decision-making body in EPSF at which discussion on all the Federation's ongoing matters and plans take place. in addition to reports adoption, admission of new members, and executive board elections.

EPSF General Assemblies are held four times a year, first during the Annual National Congress in October, the second after the mid-year vacation at the end of February, the third during the National Symposium at the end of April, and the fourth in August(final GA ). This ensures a smooth running of the Local Associations whilst taking important decisions, accepting reports of Executives and Associations, admission of new members to EPSF, and the constitutional amendments. The Full Members of EPSF have the right to vote in the General Assembly. full members of EPSF are the associations that fulfill all the conditions to become a full member, they present their reports, attend the General Assembly meetings and pay their membership fees.

== Executive Board ==
The EPSF Executive board consists of 13 elected members: President, Secretary-General, Treasurer, IPSF Contact Person, Chairperson of Public Health, Chairperson of Pharmacy Education, Student Exchange Officer, Chairperson of Human Resources, Chairperson of External Relations, Marketing Director, Training Director Chairperson of Media and Publications, Chairperson of Logistics and organizing, and one co-opted position which is the Immediate Past President works as an advisor for the Executive board. and finally one selected position which is Vice President. Executive Board members are Pharmacy students who serve the Federation as volunteers.

=== Current Executive Committee 2026-27 ===
- President : Mr. Ahmed El-Behairy
- Secretary-General: Mr. Mohamed Al Shokhaybi
- Treasurer: Ms. Mariam Sameh
- Chairperson of Human Resources: Mr. Ali Ibrahim
- Chairperson of External Relations: Ms. Amal Mohammed
- Chairperson of Pharmacy Education: Mr. Mohamed Farid
- Chairperson of Public Health: Ms. Farha Khaled
- Chairperson of Media and Publications: Mr. Ahmed Khalaf
- Chairperson of Logistics and Organizing: Mr. Abdelrahman Rakha
- Student Exchange Officer: Mr. Mohamed Gamal
- Marketing Director :Ms. Norhan Baraka
- Training Director : Ms. Samira Fareed
- IPSF Contact Person : Ms. Asmaa Ezzat
- Immediate Past President: Mr. Abdulrahman Younes

== Awards ==
On 6 December 2014 at Mall of Arabia in cairo: EPSF hit Guinness World Record under title of “Most Blood Glucose Tests taken in 24 Hours”; with 8,600 blood glucose tests and they introduced awareness about Diabetes for more than 10,000 persons at a National diabetes awareness campaign “La Vista”

On 12 August 2011, the EPSF was declared winner of the IPSF Annual Award (Sidney J. Relph Award) for the overall best-performing association in the world 2010–11 in the Gala Night of the 57th IPSF World Congress in Hat Yai, Thailand.

- Winning First Place in the IPSF Patient Counseling Competition twice.
- Winning Second Place in the IPSF Compounding Competition
- Winning First Place in the IPSF Member Association Poster Competition
- Winning First Place in the IPSF’S Tuberculosis Poster Competition
- EPSF acquired the 8th place worldwide in diabetes awareness in 2012-2013 according to the International Diabetes Federation (IDF)
- EPSF honoring In league of Arab states During world blood donation day 2016.
- Sidney J. Relph [Best Member Organization] Award Winner at the International Pharmaceutical Students' Federation on the 69th World Congress Gala Night in South Korea in 2024.
- 2nd Best Member Organization Award Winner at the International Pharmaceutical Students' Federation on the 70th World Congress Gala Night in Nairobi, Kenya in 2025.
- Sidney J. Relph [Best Member Organization] Award Winner at the International Pharmaceutical Students' Federation on the 71st World Congress Gala Night in Bangkok, Thailand in 2026.

== International Achievements ==
1-The Egyptian Pharmaceutical Students' Federation hosted the International Pharmaceutical Students' Federation annual world congress three times :

- The 30th IPSF Congress held in Alexandria in August 1984 was the first IPSF Congress to be hosted in Egypt .
- The 47th IPSF World Congress held in Cairo in August 2001 .
- The 58th IPSF World Congress 2012 held Hurghada the most recent world congress hosted by the Egyptian Pharmaceutical Students' Federation and was attended by over 500 pharmacy students from over 50 countries around the world .

2-The 5th IPSF EMPS Symposium held in Cairo in July 2016 .

3-Participation in Organizing of first annual conference of “Arab African Pharma (APP)”.

4- Hosting the 67th IPSF World Congress in Hurghada, Egypt in 2022.

5- Hosting the 12th IPSF Eastern Mediterranean Pharmaceutical Symposium at The British University in Egypt in 2026.

== EPSF Main committees ==
EPSF has 3 projects oriented committees which aim to serve pharmacy students, pharmacists and the community.

== 1-Public Health ==
The Public Health Committee is an important part of the Egyptian Pharmaceutical Students' Federation, Using their strength in scientific and public health research, they have built effective teams around Egypt, they are organizing health awareness campaigns in universities, public places, villages and schools about different epidemic places in Egypt to increase public awareness.

EPSF focuses on public health, preparing the materials and actively arranging campaigns all over Egypt with the purpose of raising people's awareness and helping them change their lifestyle.

The Public Health Committee is responsible for:

- Promoting public awareness in Egypt and delivering the concept of pharmacy students' role to the public and Spreading the latest information about Public Health topics to EPSF member association.
- Holding awareness campaigns for the WHO "Health Awareness Day" workshops during the Annual Congres, National Symposium and throughout the year.

=== Tobacco Alert Campaign ===
Each year EPSF exerts effort to reduce the prevalence of smoking-related diseases. Their target is to convince people to stop and to help them understand the risks of developing the fatal diseases caused by smoking. Congresses and campaigns aim to help people detect the diseases caused by smoking and be diagnosed early.

== 2-Pharmacy Education ==
Professional Development committee Responsible for:

- Creating events for developing the pharmacy practice and Promoting the pharmacist role in the community and improving the quality of the profession through professional events and workshops .
- Establishment of basic projects included by this portfolio such as Clinical Skills Event, Patient Counseling Event, Pharmacy Profession Awareness Campaign and Teddy Bear Hospital according to the need of EPSF through the year .

== 3-Student Exchange Program (SEP) ==
Student Exchange Program (SEP) is a project offering professional pharmacy internships. Every year, through it pharmacy students around Egypt are given the opportunity to experience the field of pharmacy in other countries. The program runs throughout the year (Winter version and Summer version), but the majority of the exchanges take place between May and September.

The length is usually 1 to 3 months with a minimum of 60 working hours per exchange, and possible host sites include

- Community pharmacy;
- Hospital pharmacy;
- Clinical pharmacy;
- Wholesale pharmacy;
- Pharmaceutical industry;
- Research at university;
- Government or private health agencies.

The host may also provide room, board, and/or pocket money in addition to the training site in order to help the applicant.

== See also ==
- Egyptian Pharmaceutical Students' Federation (EPSF)
- International Pharmaceutical Students' Federation (IPSF)
- IPSF Eastern Mediterranean Regional Office (IPSF EMRO)
- Egyptian Pharmacists' Syndicate
- Dental Students' Scientific Association of Egypt
