= Mark Cullen (physician) =

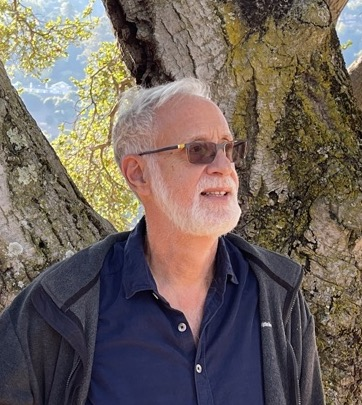
- Education: Yale University School of Medicine
- Occupation: Physician
- Medical career
- Field: Occupational medicine; Population health
- Institutions: Stanford University; Yale University

Mark Richard Cullen is an American physician, scholar, and population health scientist known for his work in occupational medicine. As a professor at Yale and later Stanford University, his research focused on the social, environmental, behavioral and bio-medical determinants of morbidity and mortality in adults, with special emphasis on the role of workplace'in such matters.

== Early life and education ==
Cullen attended Central High School in Philadelphia, Pennsylvania, graduating as valedictorian in 1967. He received his BA from Harvard College in 1971 and his MD from Yale University School of Medicine in 1976, and took post-graduate training in Internal Medicine and Clinical Epidemiology, both also at Yale.

== Career ==
=== Yale University ===
Cullen was a Professor of Medicine and Public Health and the founder/director of the Occupational and Environmental Medicine (OEM) at Yale University School of Medicine from 1981-2009. OEM hosted the first academic clinic for the study of occupational disease in the US, and the first post-doctoral fellowship to train future researchers. Early in his Yale career he focused on introducing concepts of clinical epidemiology into occupational and environmental medicine as a counterpart to the prevailing approaches of population epidemiology and animal toxicology, focusing on chemical and biologic hazards of the workplace.

His efforts enabled him to develop an academic/private partnership with Alcoa Inc. In his role as Alcoa's senior medical officer, he extended his research into the psychosocial causes of disease in the workforce, exploiting existing administrative data on 250,000 former and present employees. In 2006, Cullen was awarded an NIA grant to develop a model of population determinants of chronic disease, disability and death, followed by additional funding to study how employees and their families use various social and health benefit options.

Cullen expanded his work globally in a series of sabbaticals. During his sabbatical in Zimbabwe in 1988 Cullen conducted an epidemiological study exploring the impact of chrysotile asbestos on respiratory tract injury and malignancy risks. The work contributed to the recognition globally that chrysotile was a threat to health, equal in most ways to the other fiber types of asbestos. In Ecuador in 1993 he studied cottage manufacturing and horticulture, largely unregulated with rampant lead, mercury and pesticide poisoning. In South Africa in 1997, he joined a government commission reviewing the training programs in occupational and environmental health, leading to establishment of a new curricular model based on the emerging experience in the US.

=== Stanford University ===
In 2009 he joined Stanford University School of Medicine as Professor of Medicine and Chief of the Division of General Medical Disciplines. He oversaw the transition of Stanford Hospital from a quaternary care hospital to a broad medical system.

In 2015 Cullen founded the Center for Population Health Sciences (PHS) whose mission is to improve the health of populations by bringing together diverse disciplines and data to understand and address social, environmental, behavioral, and biological determinants. PHS allows scholars from diverse disciplines to easily and securely share, link, and analyze large disparate population-level datasets (including high risk data), facilitating a shift toward multi-disciplinary team science. The Center has 2,000 members and hosts 150 datasets.

Cullen joined the faculties of Biomedical Data Science and Epidemiology, and was appointed a senior fellow of the Stanford Institute for Economic Policy Research. He also served as the Senior Associate Dean of Research for the School of Medicine (2016–19) and Senior Associate Vice Provost for Research at the University (2018–19).

Cullen has published in many medical and scientific journals and co-edited the Textbook of Clinical Occupational and Environmental Medicine.

== Personal life ==
Cullen is married to Michele Barry, Director of the Center for Innovation in Global Health at Stanford. They have two children. Zoe is a labor economist and Assistant Professor of Business Administration at Harvard Business School, and Esme is an internist and public health researcher.

== Honors, awards and distinctions ==
- 1967: 5th place winner of the Westinghouse National Science Talent Search
- 1983: Selected in a national competition to be a Henry J. Kaiser Family Faculty Scholar in General Internal Medicine
- 1996: Invited to join the MacArthur Network on Social and Economic Status and Health
- 1997: Elected to the National Institute of Medicine (now the National Academy of Medicine)
- 2019: Received the Stanford Clinical Translation Science Award
