= International Association of Dental Students =

- IADS
- Abbreviation: IADS
- Formation: 26 August 1951
- Founded at: Copenhagen, Denmark
- Type: NGO
- Headquarters: Geneva, Switzerland
- Official language: English Language
- Executive Committee: President: Abdullah Munqith Al-Zubaidi; Vice President of Internal Affairs: Ralitsa Androlova; Vice President of Public Relations: Voon Yong Shean; Vice President of Science and Research: Shamim Ashraf; Vice President of Exchanges: Ahmet Çağlar Avcı; Vice President of Finances: Alexander Fuchs
- Key people: Dr. Peter Swiss
- Parent organization: FDI World Dental Federation
- Website: www.iads-web.org

The International Association of Dental Students (IADS) is a non-governmental organization representing interests of dental students worldwide. It was founded in August 1951 in Copenhagen, Denmark, and currently has more than 200,000 students from 60 countries.

== History ==
In February 1951, the national organization of French stomatology students invited some of their colleagues from other countries to attend their annual meeting in Paris, France, where the Danish, Dutch and Swedish representatives proposed to establish international dental students' organization. Such proposal was unanimously welcomed.

A committee consisting of representatives from Denmark, the Netherlands and the United Kingdom was formed to work out the basic principles on which to build the constitution of the association. This constitution was drafted and the first executive committee was elected; Leslie Sorling from Sweden was elected the first president.

== Congress ==
Two international meetings take place each year to offer the opportunity for dental students delegates to come together to discuss their current issues and future strategies. One of these two meetings is called the Mid Year Meeting (MYM) and usually takes place by the end of each winter, while the other one is the Annual Congress (AC) which takes place by the end of each summer.

List of IADS Congresses
Year	Mid Year Meeting	Annual Congress
2025	Turkey, Istanbul	Switzerland, Basel
2024	Tunisia, Monastir	Slovenia, Ljubljana
2023	Cyprus, Kyrenia	Egypt, Sharm El Sheikh
2022	Jordan, Amman	Kazakhstan, Almaty
2021	Online	Turkey, Istanbul
2020	Bosnia and Herzegovina, Sarajevo	Online
2019	France, Strasbourg	Tunisia, Monastir
2018	Cyprus, Kyrenia	Taiwan, Kaohsiung
2017	Lebanon, Beirut	Spain, Madrid
2016	Slovakia, Bratislava	Poland, Poznan
2015	Jordan, Amman	Thailand, Bangkok
2014	Tunisia, Tunis	Indonesia, Yogyakarta
2013	Portugal, Lisbon	Turkey, Istanbul
2012	Egypt, Alexandria	Romania, Bucharest
2011	Russia, Moscow	India, New Delhi
2010	Macedonia, Skopje	Czech Republic, Brno
2009	Slovenia, Ljubljana	Romania, Iași
2008	Poland, Lublin	Egypt, Sharm El Sheikh
2007	Georgia, Tbilisi	Hungary, Lake Balaton
2006	Croatia, Split	Sudan, Khartoum
2005	Norway, Bergen	Czech Republic, Prague
2004	Slovenia, Ljubljana	Germany, Berlin
2003	Poland, Kraków	Turkey, Istanbul
2002	Czech Republic, Prague	Egypt, Sharm El Sheikh
2001	Turkey, Istanbul	Malaysia, Kuala Lumpur
2000	Hungary, Budapest	Malta, Buġibba
1965	United Kingdom, London	United Kingdom, London
1964	United Kingdom, London	Netherlands, Amsterdam
1963	United Kingdom, London	Cancelled
1962	United Kingdom, London	Germany, Düsseldorf
1961	United Kingdom, London	United Kingdom, London
1960	United Kingdom, London	Sweden, Stockholm
1959	United Kingdom, London	Germany, Berlin
1958	United Kingdom, London	Belgium, Ghent
1957	United Kingdom, London	Norway, Oslo
1956	United Kingdom, London	United Kingdom, New Castle
1955	United Kingdom, London	Sweden, Malmo
1954	United Kingdom, London	Netherlands, Utrecht
1953	United Kingdom, London	Germany, Marburg
1952	United Kingdom, London	United Kingdom, Birmingham
1951	France, Paris	Denmark, Copenhagen

== Honorary Life Members ==
The title of Honorary Life Member (HLM) is the highest rank within the IADS, awarded to leaders through unanimous voting by the General Assembly. This designation recognises leaders who have made enduring and exceptional contributions to the association's mission and objectives. According to IADS Bylaws, "Honorary Life Members (HLM) shall be persons who have made distinguished contributions to the Association, and must be appointed unanimously by the General Assembly and shall be ex-officio members of the General Assembly without the right to vote, unless they have been certified as delegates by a Full Member".

List of Honorary Life Members (HLMs)
Name	Country	Year of Appointment
Abanoub Riad	Egypt	2022
Sina Saygili	Turkey	2022
Tomaz Spindler	Slovenia	2019
Omar Albairat	Morocco	2017
Pavel Scarlat	Romania	2017
Ahmed Hawas	Egypt	2008
Mark Antal	Hungary	2007
Sarkis Sozkes	Turkey	2002
Christopher Orr	United Kingdom	2001
Roberto Cabassa	Puerto Rico	2000
Eric Nomand	France	1999
Stephen Smith	United Kingdom	1997
Aldo Miranda	Puerto Rico	1995
Lynn Walters	United Kingdom	1984
Asterios Doukodakis	United States of America	N/A
Marty Lipsey	United States of America	N/A
Peter Swiss	United Kingdom	N/A
Peter Dyer	United Kingdom	N/A
John Seear	United Kingdom	N/A
Aylwin Drakeford Hitchin	United Kingdom	N/A
Jan-Eric Ahlberg	Sweden	N/A
Carlos Bravo-Castro	Puerto Rico	N/A
H. W. Hasse	Germany	N/A
Arje Sheinin	Finland	N/A
P. O. Pedersen	Denmark	N/A

== Green Dentistry Day ==
Green Dentistry is a joint project between IADS and Freier Verband Deutscher Zahnärzte (FVDZ) Student Chamber with the goal to raise awareness in dental practitioners and teach them how to change their routines towards a profitable and eco-friendly workflow for their future dental practices. Because in the last 20 years the trash produced per dental clinic has strongly increased, the tendency to use more and more single-use instruments (disposable) in the dental field and to be economically prepared for Future regulation.

Green Dentistry Day is held each year on 22 May. It was launched in 2020 by competition among worldwide dental students in order to promote green dentistry.

== See also ==
- International Federation of Medical Students Associations (IFMSA)
- International Pharmaceutical Students' Federation (IPSF)
- World Dental Federation (FDI)
- International Association for Dental, Oral, and Craniofacial Research (IADR)
