= Établissement public de sécurité ferroviaire =

French national railway safety authority

- Formation: 2006
- Type: Établissement public à caractère administratif
- Headquarters: Amiens, France
- Affiliations: Ministère de la Transition écologique et de la Cohésion des territoires
- Budget: €13 million

The Établissement public de sécurité ferroviaire (Public Railway Safety Establishment), abbreviated EPSF, is a public administrative body under the supervision of the Direction générale des infrastructures, des transports et des mobilités. It serves as France's national railway safety authority, in accordance with the provisions of EU Directive 2004/49/EC, which was repealed on June 16, 2020, by Directive 2016/798.

The EPSF functions independently of the Autorité de régulation des transports (ART), which is responsible for regulating the economic aspects of transport. While SNCF Réseau—France’s primary railway infrastructure manager—issues operational documentation that is binding for railway undertakings, the EPSF focuses on safety-related matters. It publishes informational resources, including procedures for rolling stock assistance, tunnel operations, and timetable compliance.

== General objective and administrative structure ==
As the national railway safety authority, the EPSF is responsible for ensuring that the various entities involved in the French rail system—particularly railway undertakings (RUs) and infrastructure managers (IMs)—carry out their operational and management responsibilities safely.

The EPSF was established by Law No. 2006-10 of January 5, 2006, concerning transport safety and development. It operates under the supervision of the Minister of Transport. However, the Minister may only request that the EPSF's Managing Director re-examine a decision related to railway safety or interoperability in cases where there is a serious threat to public order or the continuity of public service. EPSF is placed under the financial supervision of the Minister for the Budget.

== Exercising its missions ==
According to the French Transport Code, the EPSF is responsible for ensuring compliance with the rules governing the safety and interoperability of rail transport. This oversight is carried out at multiple levels, including the issuance of authorizations required to engage in railway activities, as well as through audits and inspections to verify that railway operators are fulfilling their responsibilities safely.

EPSF grants several types of operating authorizations, including:

- Single Safety Certificate: Required for railway undertakings (RUs) to operate transport services on the national rail network. It certifies their ability to run trains safely.
- Safety Approval: Required for infrastructure managers (IMs) to admit RUs onto their network. It confirms their capacity to ensure the declared characteristics of the infrastructure and to manage rail traffic safely.
- Approval of Training Organizations: Necessary for organizations that provide training for personnel assigned to safety-critical tasks (SCTs), such as train drivers. This approval is essential when RUs or IMs outsource training rather than conducting it internally.
- European Train Driver’s License: Mandatory for individuals wishing to drive trains on the EU rail network. Applicants must demonstrate a minimum level of railway knowledge, as well as physical and psychological fitness.
- Marketing Authorizations for Rail Vehicles: Cover vehicles such as wagons, carriages, locomotives, and self-propelled units.
- Infrastructure Commissioning Authorizations: Required for commissioning infrastructure elements such as new railway lines or signal boxes.

Under the provisions of the European Union’s Fourth Railway Package—specifically Directives (EU) 2016/797 (“Interoperability”) and 2016/798 (“Safety”), implemented in France through Decree No. 2019-525 of May 27, 2019—the responsibilities for issuing single safety certificates and marketing authorizations for rail vehicles are shared between EPSF and the European Union Agency for Railways.

EPSF is also in charge of registering rail vehicles located in France and maintains the National Rail Vehicle Register. It has the authority to restrict, suspend, or withdraw authorizations if inspections or audits reveal non-compliance with the conditions under which those authorizations were granted. Furthermore, EPSF oversees the marketing of railway interoperability components within France.

Beyond its regulatory and oversight functions, EPSF also contributes to shaping the regulatory framework. It develops best practices, issues recommendations, and publishes technical documents to guide stakeholders in the railway sector.

== Organization ==
EPSF is based in Amiens, where all its employees are grouped. In addition to a general secretariat and an information systems department, the organization of the establishment is structured into three departments covering the three main business lines:

- Authorizations;
- Controls;
- Regulatory, European and International Affairs.

EPSF has a twelve-member Board of Directors, including a government representative from the Conseil général de l'environnement et du développement durable, five ministerial representatives (Director of Transport Services, Director of Transport Infrastructures, Director of Enterprises, Director of Civil Security and Crisis Management, Director of the Budget), two members of parliament, two qualified personalities and two staff representatives.

== Finances ==
The EPSF’s annual budget, approximately €13 million, is primarily funded by a state subsidy for public service obligations. Additional revenue comes from fees for processing applications and issuing licenses, such as the European train driver license.

== Notability and impact ==
The EPSF plays a critical role in maintaining France’s railway safety standards, aligning with EU regulations to ensure interoperability across Europe. According to a 2023 report by the International Union of Railways, France’s rigorous safety oversight, led by the EPSF, has contributed to one of the lowest railway accident rates in the EU. Major news outlets, such as Le Monde, have highlighted the EPSF’s role in modernizing safety protocols following high-profile rail incidents.

== See also ==
- European Union Agency for Railways
- Federal Railway Authority
