= Faculty of Dentistry, Alexandria University =

Alexandria Faculty of Dentistry
- Type: Public
- Established: 1945 (as School of Dentistry); 1970 (as The Faculty of Dentistry)
- Affiliations: Alexandria University
- Location: Shampoalion Street, Azarita, Alexandria, Egypt
- Campus: Urban
- Website: dent.alexu.edu.eg/index.php/en/

The Faculty of Dentistry (Arabic: كلية طب الأسنان بالاسكندريه) was established in 1945 as The School of Dentistry as part of the Faculty of Medicine of Alexandria University in 1945/1946 with only two students.

The Faculty of Dentistry was officially founded independently in 1970.

== Notable alumni ==
- Samir Bishara

== See also ==
- Educational institutions in Alexandria
