= Australian Medical Students' Association =

Australian Medical Students’ Association
- Formation: 1960
- Type: Student organization, Professional organization
- Purpose: Connect, Inform, Represent
- Location: Australia
- Members: 20000 medical students
- Official language: English
- President: Arjun Nigam
- Website: amsa.org.au

The Australian Medical Students' Association (AMSA) is an independent association of the 17,000 medical students in Australia. AMSA was formed in 1960 in Brisbane, as a conference organised to network medical students from Australia. It has since grown to become the peak representative body for Australia's medical students—serving a mandate to connect, inform and represent medical students in Australia. Its tri-annual Council meetings include representatives from medical societies at each of Australia's 23 medical schools.

AMSA is a member of the International Federation of Medical Students' Associations.

== History ==
In 1960, medical students from around Australia met in Brisbane for their first national conference. Never before had Australian medical students come together as one body to discuss ideas, share information and voice their opinions and concerns. Since then, the Australian Medical Students' Association has grown and evolved into one of Australia's largest student representative bodies.

=== Past presidents ===
- 2026: Arjun Nigam, James Cook University
- 2025: Melody Ahfock, The University of Queensland
- 2024: Allen Xiao, The University of Melbourne
- 2023: Tish Sivagnanan, James Cook University
- 2022: Jasmine Davis, The University of Melbourne
- 2021: Sophie Keen, Western Sydney University
- 2020: Daniel Zou, The University of Melbourne
- 2019: Jessica Yang, The University of Western Sydney
- 2018: Alex Farrell, The University of NSW
- 2017: Rob Thomas, The University of Queensland
- 2016: Elise Buisson, The University of Western Sydney
- 2015: James Lawler, The University of Newcastle
- 2014: Jessica Dean, Monash University
- 2013: Benjamin Veness, The University of Sydney
- 2012: James Churchill, The University of Melbourne
- 2011: Robert Marshall, The University of Western Australia
- 2010: Ross Roberts-Thomson, The University of Adelaide
- 2009: Tiffany Fulde, The University of New South Wales
- 2008: Michael Bonning, The University of Queensland
- 2007: Robert Mitchell, Monash University
- 2006: Teresa Cosgriff, The University of Melbourne
- 2005: Dror Maor, The University of Western Australia
- 2004: Matthew Hutchinson, The University of Adelaide
- 2003: Nicholas Brown, The University of Queensland

== Advocacy ==
=== 2020 advocacy priorities ===
National Advocacy Priorities are determined through a National Survey distributed around August. The survey allows medical students to provide input into the national priorities for the following year, and comment on what is most important to them. Each comment is read and national priorities created off that. At the meeting of the third National AMSA Council of each year, AMSA presents the advocacy priorities. For 2020, they are as follows;

National Priorities

- Improving medical student mental health and wellbeing
- Preventing increases in medical student numbers and establishment of new medical schools
- Action on sexual harassment, bullying and discrimination in medicine
- Increasing intake onto specialty training programs that align with workforce demand, with a particular focus on regional and rural areas
- Work collaboratively to improve the health of Australia's Indigenous people (including recruitment and support of Indigenous medical students)
- Improving the quality of clinical schools and placements for medical students
- Increase the availability of quality internships for all medical students
- Working collaboratively to minimise the health impacts of climate change through mitigation and adaptation strategies

== Annual conferences ==
=== AMSA National Convention ===
AMSA National Convention is the largest student-run conference in the world and brings together over 800+ medical students from across Australia and New Zealand. AMSA National Convention began in 1960 to bring medical students together. Convention embodies the core values of AMSA and continues to be the highlight of the Association’s calendar every year.

National Convention is a five-day event compassing academics, socials, and convention games. The Emergency Medical Challenge (EMC) is the largest emergency medicine simulation in the country, and is held at the National Convention. The National Convention also features research presentations, poster competitions, debating and sports challenges, and unparalleled networking with the future of the health profession.

=== AMSA Global Health Conference ===
Originally known as the Developing World Conference, and established in 2005 by members of the Australian Medical Students' Association, the Global Health Conference is a meeting of medical students from around Australia that aims to fulfill the desire of medical students to discuss broader issues relevant to global health.

The inaugural conference hosted 200 delegates in Sydney, whilst the 2006 conference in Perth saw more than 250 students attend. In 2007, Adelaide hosted over 300 delegates at an event that sold out nationwide in less than 12 hours.

The academic programme is filled with speakers from many disciplines, including workers from Medecins Sans Frontieres, Health Advisors to Non-for-profit organisations, Politicians and many many more; while the social programme allows students to meet like-minded individuals from around the country.

The Global Health Conference aims to educate and empower medical students with knowledge about global health.

The next AMSA Global Health Conference will be held in Adelaide in 2024. The theme of the event 'Inception' embraces the many layers of complexity we must navigate to make change, and inspires the ability to break through them.

=== AMSA Rural Health Summit ===
Of AMSA's major conferences, the Rural Health Summit is the newest, having started in 2016. That year it was hosted in Melbourne and known as the Rural Health Colloquium, before taking on the name of Rural Health Summit from 2017 onwards. The Rural Health Summit has a focus on the health related challenges faced by Australia's rural and regional population, and illuminates the opportunities that exist for medical students to pursue a career in rural and regional areas.

Previous locations for The AMSA Rural Health Summit:

- 2016: Melbourne (As the AMSA Rural Health Colloquium)
- 2017: Wollongong
- 2018: Albury
- 2019: Cairns
- 2020: Armidale
- 2026: Armidale

=== AMSA National Leadership Development Seminar ===
AMSA's National Leadership Development Seminar (NLDS) is held each year in the nation's capital, Canberra. Running over five days and four nights, the seminar is an exclusive conference on the medical student calendar with only 80-100 students selected to attend. The seminar aims to bring together some of the brightest minds and challenge and develop their leadership and opinions.

== Community engagement ==
=== Vampire Cup ===
The Vampire Cup is AMSA's national blood drive run in association with the Australian Red Cross. The 22 Australian medical societies compete for the prestigious cup with the society with the highest number of donations per capita being awarded victory. In 2019, there were 3461 donations nationally with Australian National University (ANUMSS) winning the Vampire Cup for the second year in a row with 79.3% of their cohort donating. James Cook University won the most total donations with a record 845 donations, the most in the history of the competition.

== See also ==
- Australian Medical Association
- International Federation of Medical Students' Associations
