= British Pharmaceutical Students' Association =

British student organisation

The British Pharmaceutical Students' Association is the official student organisation of the Royal Pharmaceutical Society of Great Britain. Founded in 1942, the Association represents pharmacy students and pre-registration trainees in the United Kingdom. The Royal Pharmaceutical Society has supported it since its foundation, and marked its 80th anniversary by organising a rebranding.

The Association elects its officers and an executive. Junel Ahmed was elected president in July 2018, but stepped down in January 2019.

The Association organises conferences and visits campuses each year to recruit members. Pharmacy Schools have funded students to attend their events.

The Association makes an annual report to the General Pharmaceutical Council on the pre-registration examinations. In 2018 the report was highly critical. The report was based on feedback from 266 of the 2,942 candidates.

From 2018 with the development of pharmacists in primary care students were much in demand and retail pharmacies keen to develop relationships with the association.
