= Ayoade Olatunbosun-Alakija =

Nigerian social justice activist

Ayoade Olatunbosun‑Alakija
- Born: Nigeria
- Education: London School of Hygiene and Tropical Medicine
- Occupations: Medical doctor; global health advocate
- Known for: Global health leadership; pandemic preparedness; equitable access to diagnostics and vaccines
- Office: Ministerial Global Envoy on Antimicrobial Resistance (Nigeria)

Ayoade Olatunbosun-Alakija is a Nigerian medical doctor and social activist who was Nigeria's chief humanitarian coordinator. She has been advocating that women leaders be assertive in overcoming resistance to be included in leading conversations. Alakija was one of the speakers at the 2018 Women Leaders in Global Health Conference.

== Education ==
Ayoade holds a Master of Science degree in International Development and public health from the London School of Hygiene and Tropical Medicine.

== Career ==
=== Political career ===
In 2025, Ayoade was appointed by the Government of Nigeria as Ministerial Global Envoy on Antimicrobial Resistance (AMR) ahead of the Fifth Global High‑Level Ministerial Conference on AMR, to be held in Abuja in June 2026. In this role she is expected to support high‑level advocacy, resource mobilisation, and policy formulation related to AMR.

Alongside her national appointment, Alakija currently to serve as Special Envoy for the Access to COVID-19 Tools (ACT) Accelerator for the World Health Organization, and as chair of the Board of the Foundation for Innovative New Diagnostics (FIND). She is also Chair of the African Vaccine Delivery Alliance (AVDA) and Co‑Chair of the G7 Impact Investment Initiative in Global Health.

=== Professional career ===
Alakija is a medical doctor.

She is the founder of the Nexus Hub, an innovation centre, research, social development and emergency response unit for the West Africa/Sahel region with headquarter in Abuja, Nigeria. She is a published researcher.

Her previous roles include Chief Humanitarian Coordinator for Nigeria, where she led integrated humanitarian response efforts and engagements with multilateral partners.
