= Distributed System Security Architecture =

Computer security architecture

Distributed System Security Architecture or (DSSA) is a computer security architecture that provides a suite of functions including login, authentication, and access control in a distributed system. To differ from other similar architectures, the DSSA architecture offers the ability to access all these functions without the trusted server (known as a certificate authority) being active.

In DSSA, security objects are handled by owners and access is controlled by the central, universally trusted, certificate authority.

== DSSA/SPX ==
DSSA/SPX is the authentication protocol of DSSA. The CDC is a certificate granting server while the certificate is a ticket signed by CA which contains the public key of the party being certified. Since the CDC is merely distributing previously signed certificates, it is not necessary for it to be trusted.

$A \to CDC\colon B$

$CDC \to A\colon \operatorname{certificate}(B, CA)$

$A \to B\colon A, \{T_A, A\}K_{AB}, \{L, A, P'_A\}S_A, \{\{K_{AB}\}P_B\}S'_A$

$B \to CDC\colon A$

$CDC \to B\colon \operatorname{certificate}(A, CA)$

$B \to A\colon \{T_A + 1\}K_{AB}$
