= International Federation of Medical Students' Associations =

Non-governmental organization

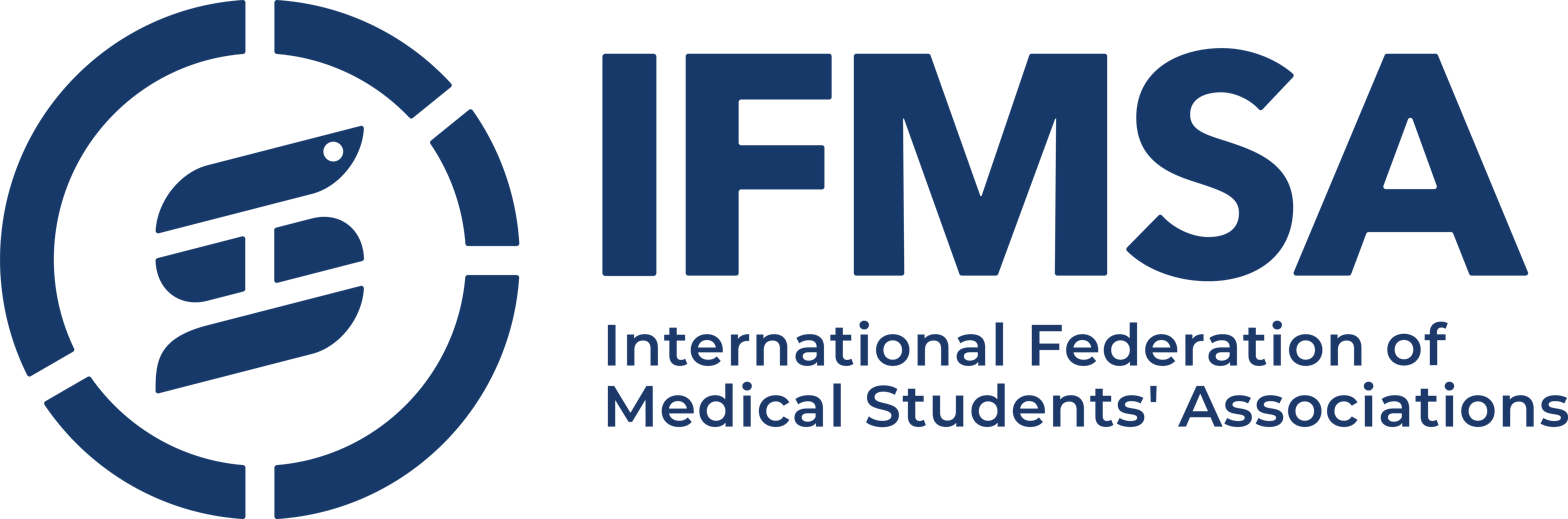
- Formation: 1951
- Type: Non-governmental federation
- Headquarters: Amsterdam
- Location: the Netherlands
- Members: 135 National Member Organizations
- Official language: English
- President: Hana Kroupová
- Website: www.ifmsa.org

The International Federation of Medical Students' Associations (IFMSA) is a non-governmental organization representing associations of medical students. It was founded in May 1951 and currently maintains 133 member organizations from 123 countries around.

== History ==
The International Federation of Medical Students' Associations was one of the numerous international student organizations set up directly after the end of the Second World War. The first meeting that saw the establishment of the Federation was held in Copenhagen, Denmark in May 1951. The first members of this new organization were the United Kingdom, Austria, the Federal Republic of Germany, Finland, Norway, Sweden, the Netherlands, Switzerland, and Denmark. London saw the first General Assembly of IFMSA in July 1952. The meeting had a total of thirty participants from ten countries.

Starting from the exclusively European founding organizations, the Federation has expanded to include 136 members from all over the world.

The IFMSA has always focused on student mobility and exchange as well as conference and workshop organization. The first conferences were known as the Student International Clinical Conferences, and they were quite successful in the 1950s. Various summer schools have been organized through the years, starting in 1963 in Denmark, the United Kingdom, and Scandinavia. Other conferences have discussed medical education, drugs, AIDS, and HIV issues. In the 1960s projects were organized to help less advantaged students in developing countries the Book Aid project, which sought to send medical books from wealthier nations and the Equipment Appeal, which promoted the shipping of surplus medical equipment to these countries.

The 1970s medical students saw a need for the decentralization of IFMSA. To this aim, IFMSA contributed to the creation of regional medical student organizations in Africa and Asia. Subsequently, regional vice-presidents were elected for six regions as a way of promoting regionalization, but this structure was abandoned after a few years.

In the early 1980s, the IFMSA issued a number of resolutions and declarations on topics ranging from Medical Education to the Prevention of Nuclear War to Primary Health Care. In the late 1980s, there was a push towards organizing projects that would be able to make a change locally and thus the Village Concept Project idea was born after collaboration with other international student organizations. 1986 also saw the start of the Leadership Training Programs in collaboration with World Health Organization (WHO). These training programs are still active today.

Official relations with WHO started back in 1969, when the collaboration resulted in the organization of a symposium on "Programmed Learning in Medical Education", as well as immunology and tropical medicine programs. In the following years, the IFMSA and the WHO collaborated in the organization of a number of workshops and training programs. The IFMSA has been collaborating with UNESCO since 1971. Since 2007, the IFMSA has been an official supporting organization of HIFA2015 (Healthcare Information For All by 2015).

== Activities ==
The main activities of the IFMSA are student exchanges and different projects. Around 14,000 medical students each year participate in international medical student exchanges, both professional and academic (research). The IFMSA organizes projects, programs, seminars and workshops on areas of public health, medical education, reproductive health and human rights and peace.

== Organization ==
All activities of the IFMSA are linked to one of its six standing committees, which are:

- Standing Committee on Medical Education (SCOME)
- Standing Committee on Professional Exchange (SCOPE)
- Standing Committee on Research Exchange (SCORE)
- Standing Committee on Public Health (SCOPH)
- Standing Committee on Sexual & Reproductive Health and Rights including HIV & AIDS (SCORA)
- Standing Committee on Human Rights and Peace (SCORP)

In addition, the Federation is internally divided into five regions:

- Africa
- Americas
- Asia-Pacific
- Eastern-Mediterranean
- Europe

== Structure ==
To be able to work together, the IFMSA has created an organizational structure, which facilitates the flow of ideas and enables the development of activities.

The IFMSA is composed of medical students' associations from 125 different countries, which are formed 135 members of IFMSA and are called National Member Organizations (NMOs). All the activities of the IFMSA are organized by the NMO system. Most NMOs have Local Committees at the medical schools in their country, which coordinate and organize IFMSA activities. Through these Local Committees, the NMOs are in direct contact with the medical students.

The IFMSA is a federation, which respects the autonomy of its members, the NMOs. The NMOs can decide which activities they take part in and what new activities should be developed.

The decision-making process is in the hands of the General Assembly, the executive process is in the hands of the International Board and the controlling power is in the hands of the Supervising Council.

The General Assembly (GA) is composed of representatives of all NMO's, and meets twice a year in March and August. The General Assembly decides the activities of IFMSA, the regulations, and the management and elects the Team of Officials and the Supervising Council.

The General Assembly elects the Team of Officials (TO) each year. It is composed of the Executive Board (EB), Standing Committee Directors, Liaison Officers, and Regional Directors. The executive board is responsible for the daily management of the Federation and deals with issues such as fundraising, marketing, external relations, finances, administration, development and support to National Member Organizations.

Standing Committee Directors are assigned to one field of activities. They coordinate the Standing Committee, which carries out these activities. They give support to national and local officers, prepare the meetings of the Standing Committee and are responsible for the development of new activities.

Liaison Officers maintain contact with important external relations and represent IFMSA towards those organizations. The Regional Directors are responsible for each of the IFMSA 5 Regions.

The Supervising Council is elected by the General Assembly to evaluate and supervise the work of the IFMSA officials and undertakes actions in case problems arise.

== National Member Organizations ==
A National Member Organization is a national, independent, and student-run association representing medical students in a specific country or territory

Member organization	Country or region	Flag	Membership status
ACMS Albania	Albania	Albania	Member
IFMSA-Algeria	Algeria	Algeria	Member
IFMSA-Argentina	Argentina	Argentina	Member
BIL Armenia	Armenia	Armenia	Member
AMSA Austria	Austria	Austria	Member
AzerMDS Azerbaijan	Azerbaijan	Azerbaijan	Member
BMSS Bangladesh	Bangladesh	Bangladesh	Member
BeMSA Belgium	Belgium	Belgium	Member
BoHeMSA	Bosnia and Herzegovina	Bosnia and Herzegovina	Member
SaMSIC	Bosnia and Herzegovina	Bosnia and Herzegovina	Member
IFMSA-Brazil	Brazil	Brazil	Member
DENEM Brazil	Brazil	Brazil	Member
BMSA Brunei	Brunei	Brunei	Candidate Member
AMSB Bulgaria	Bulgaria	Bulgaria	Member
AEM Burkina Faso	Burkina Faso	Burkina Faso	Member
ABEM Burundi	Burundi	Burundi	Member
CAMSA Cameroon	Cameroon	Cameroon	Member
CFMS Canada	Canada	Canada	Member
IFMSA-Quebec	Quebec, Canada	Canada	Member
NEMUNICV-Cape Verde	Cape Verde	Cape Verde	Member
IFMSA-Chile	Chile	Chile	Member
CFMSA-China	China	China	Member
ASCEMCOL Colombia	Colombia	Colombia	Member
ACEM Costa Rica	Costa Rica	Costa Rica	Member
CroMSIC Croatia	Croatia	Croatia	Member
CyMSA Cyprus	Cyprus	Cyprus	Member
MSANC Northern Cyprus	Northern Cyprus	—	Member
IFMSA-CZ	Czech Republic	Czech Republic	Member
IMCC Denmark	Denmark	Denmark	Member
ODEM Dominican Republic	Dominican Republic	Dominican Republic	Member
AEMPPI-Ecuador	Ecuador	Ecuador	Member
IFMSA-Egypt	Egypt	Egypt	Member
IFMSA-El Salvador	El Salvador	El Salvador	Member
EstMSA Estonia	Estonia	Estonia	Member
FiMSIC Finland	Finland	Finland	Member
ANEMF France	France	France	Member
GMSA Georgia	Georgia	Georgia	Member
bvmd Germany	Germany	Germany	Member
FGMSA Ghana	Ghana	Ghana	Member
HelMSIC Greece	Greece	Greece	Member
IFMSA-Grenada	Grenada	Grenada	Member
IFMSA-Guatemala	Guatemala	Guatemala	Member
IFMSA-Honduras	Honduras	Honduras	Member
AMSAHK	Hong Kong	Hong Kong	Member
HuMSIRC Hungary	Hungary	Hungary	Member
IMSA Iceland	Iceland	Iceland	Member
MSAI India	India	India	Member
CIMSA-Indonesia	Indonesia	Indonesia	Member
IMSA-Iran	Iran	Iran	Member
IFMSA-Iraq	Iraq	Iraq	Member
IFMSA-Kurdistan	Kurdistan Region, Iraq	—	Member
AMSI Ireland	Ireland	Ireland	Member
FIMS Israel	Israel	Israel	Member
SISM Italy	Italy	Italy	Member
IFMSA-Japan	Japan	Japan	Member
IFMSA-Jo	Jordan	Jordan	Member
KazMSA Kazakhstan	Kazakhstan	Kazakhstan	Member
MSAKE Kenya	Kenya	Kenya	Member
LaMSA Latvia	Latvia	Latvia	Member
LeMSIC Lebanon	Lebanon	Lebanon	Member
LMSA Libya	Libya	Libya	Member
LiMSA Lithuania	Lithuania	Lithuania	Member
ALEM Luxembourg	Luxembourg	Luxembourg	Member
MSA Malawi	Malawi	Malawi	Member
SMMAMS Malaysia	Malaysia	Malaysia	Member
MMSA Malta	Malta	Malta	Member
AMMEF Mexico	Mexico	Mexico	Member
MoMSIC Montenegro	Montenegro	Montenegro	Member
IFMSA-Morocco	Morocco	Morocco	Member
IFMSA-The Netherlands	Netherlands	Netherlands	Member
NiMSA Nigeria	Nigeria	Nigeria	Member
NMSA Norway	Norway	Norway	Member
MedSCO-Oman	Oman	Oman	Member
PMSA-Palestine	Palestine	Palestine	Member
IFMSA-Panama	Panama	Panama	Member
IFMSA-Paraguay	Paraguay	Paraguay	Member
IFMSA-Peru	Peru	Peru	Member
AMSA-Philippines	Philippines	Philippines	Member
IFMSA-Poland	Poland	Poland	Member
ANEM Portugal	Portugal	Portugal	Member
KMSA Korea	South Korea	South Korea	Member
ASRM Moldova	Moldova	Moldova	Member
MMSA North Macedonia	North Macedonia	North Macedonia	Member
FASMR Romania	Romania	Romania	Member
HCCM Russia	Russia	Russia	Member
TaMSA-Tatarstan	Tatarstan, Russia	Russia	Member
MEDSAR Rwanda	Rwanda	Rwanda	Member
IFMSA-Serbia	Serbia	Serbia	Member
KOMS-Kosovo	Kosovo	Kosovo	Member
SLEMSA Sierra Leone	Sierra Leone	Sierra Leone	Member
AMSA-Singapore	Singapore	Singapore	Member
SloMSA Slovakia	Slovakia	Slovakia	Member
SloMSIC Slovenia	Slovenia	Slovenia	Member
IFMSA-Spain	Spain	Spain	Member
AECS Catalonia	Catalonia, Spain	Spain	Member
MedSIN Sudan	Sudan	Sudan	Member
FSSMA South Sudan	South Sudan	South Sudan	Candidate Member
IFMSA-Sweden	Sweden	Sweden	Member
swimsa Switzerland	Switzerland	Switzerland	Member
SMSA Syria	Syria	Syria	Candidate Member
FMS-Taiwan	Taiwan	Taiwan	Member
IFMSA-Thailand	Thailand	Thailand	Member
Associa-Med Tunisia	Tunisia	Tunisia	Member
TurkMSIC Türkiye	Turkey	Turkey	Member
FUMSA Uganda	Uganda	Uganda	Member
UMSA Ukraine	Ukraine	Ukraine	Member
IFMSA-UAE	United Arab Emirates	United Arab Emirates	Member
SfGH UK	United Kingdom	United Kingdom	Member
TAMSA Tanzania	Tanzania	Tanzania	Member
AMSA US	United States	United States	Member
FEVESOCEM Venezuela	Venezuela	Venezuela	Member
NOHS-Vietnam	Vietnam	Vietnam	Member
NAMS Yemen	Yemen	Yemen	Member
ZIMSA Zimbabwe	Zimbabwe	Zimbabwe	Member
MSA-SKN	Saint Kitts and Nevis	Saint Kitts and Nevis	Candidate Member
SMSC	Saudi Arabia	Saudi Arabia	Candidate Member
IFMSA-BH	Bahrain	Bahrain	Suspended
IFMSA-Bolivia	Bolivia	Bolivia	Suspended
MSA-DRC	Democratic Republic of the Congo	Democratic Republic of the Congo	Suspended
EMSA Ethiopia	Ethiopia	Ethiopia	Suspended
AEMG-Gabon	Gabon	Gabon	Suspended
GaMSA Gambia	Gambia	Gambia	Suspended
AEM Guinea	Guinea	Guinea	Suspended
AHEM Haiti	Haiti	Haiti	Suspended
NOHSS Ivory Coast	Ivory Coast	Ivory Coast	Suspended
JAMSA Jamaica	Jamaica	Jamaica	Suspended
KuMSA Kuwait	Kuwait	Kuwait	Suspended
AMSA-Kyrgyzstan	Kyrgyzstan	Kyrgyzstan	Suspended
LMSA Liberia	Liberia	Liberia	Suspended
APS Mali	Mali	Mali	Suspended
NMSS Nepal	Nepal	Nepal	Suspended
AESS Niger	Niger	Niger	Suspended
IFMSA-Pakistan	Pakistan	Pakistan	Suspended
QMSA Qatar	Qatar	Qatar	Suspended
NAHSAS Somalia	Somalia	Somalia	Suspended
IFMSA-SA	South Africa	South Africa	Suspended
AEMP-Togo	Togo	Togo	Suspended

== Presidents ==
Term	President	National Member Organization	Country or area	Region
1952–1953	Erik Holst	IMCC Denmark	Denmark	Europe
1995–1996	Lennert Veerman	IFMSA-NL	Netherlands	Europe
2001–2002	Joel Kammeyer	AMSA-USA	United States	Americas
2002–2003	Kristina Sjoberg Ogaard	NMSA Norway	Norway	Europe
2003–2004	Emily Spry	MedSIN-UK	United Kingdom	Europe
2005–2006	Jana Kammeyer	SloMSA Slovakia	Slovakia	Europe
2006–2007	Ahmed Ali	MedSIN Sudan	Sudan	Africa
2007–2008	Anas Eid	PMSA Palestine	Palestine	Eastern Mediterranean
2008–2009	Melhim Bou Alwan	LeMSIC Lebanon	Lebanon	Eastern Mediterranean
2009–2010	Silva Rukavina	CroMSIC Croatia	Croatia	Europe
2010–2011	Chijioke Kaduru	FGMSA Ghana	Ghana	Africa
2011–2012	Christopher Pleyer	AMSA Austria	Austria	Europe
2012–2013	Roopa Dhatt	AMSA-USA	United States	Americas
2013–2014	Josko Mise	CroMSIC Croatia	Croatia	Europe
2014–2015	Agostinho Sousa	ANEM Portugal	Portugal	Europe
2015–2016	Karim M. Abu Zied	IFMSA-Egypt	Egypt	Eastern Mediterranean
2016–2017	Omar Cherkaoui	IFMSA-Morocco	Morocco	Eastern Mediterranean
2018–2019	Batool Al-Wahdani	IFMSA-Jo	Jordan	Eastern Mediterranean
2019–2020	Nebojša Nikolić	IFMSA-Serbia	Serbia	Europe
2020–2021	Po-Chin Li	FMS Taiwan	Taiwan	Asia-Pacific
2021–2022	Mohamed El Amine Youcef Ali	Le Souk Algeria	Algeria	Eastern Mediterranean
2022–2023	Mariona Borrell Arrasa	AECS Catalonia	Catalonia, Spain	Europe
2023–2024	Evangelia Roumpou	HelMSIC Greece	Greece	Europe
2024–2025	Angelo Estefano Moreno Ramos	AEMPPI-Ecuador	Ecuador	Americas
2025–2026	Hana Kroupová	IFMSA-CZ	Czech Republic	Europe

== Meetings ==
=== General Assemblies ===
Twice a year, the delegations of the NMO's of IFMSA gather at the IFMSA General Assemblies. The March Meeting and the August Meeting bring together 600 to 900 medical students from around the world. During the seven days of the meetings, the delegates discuss Federation business and make contacts for their organizations.

The General Assembly remains the highest decision-making body of the Federation. The actual program of the meeting has developed into a mixture of training, planning and evaluation sessions in between the legislative Plenary Sessions. The work in the Standing Committees of IFMSA is the essence for most delegates: signing contracts, presenting and planning projects are all in a day's work for the National Officers from the participating organizations. An extensive Training and Resource Development component has been integrated in the program, providing the participants with new skills needed in their work, but seldom found in the regular University curriculum: Lobbying Skills, Group Dynamics and Strategic Planning to name a few.

With IFMSA being much more than just exchanges, the Project Fair has evolved to extend presentations of local, national and international projects outside the Standing Committees. Round Table Discussions enable the student delegates to discuss currently relevant topics with invited experts and short lectures are frequently given by representatives from, for example, different UN agencies.

A special Financial Committee is elected at each General Assembly to audit the budget and finances of the Federation. Other legislative proceedings at the meetings include the adoption of reports from the executive board members, IFMSA Officials and IFMSA projects, and the adoption of official IFMSA Policy Statements. Guidelines on which areas IFMSA should focus on and other important decisions for the future of the Federation are prepared by the Presidents of the National Member Organizations and the executive board and brought for approval to the Plenary Sessions.

Hosting a General Assembly is a major event for the Organizing Committee. The entire process is run by student volunteers, from fundraising to implementation.

=== Regional and sub-regional meetings ===
In addition to the General Assemblies, the National Member Organizations are also getting together for Regional Meetings. These meetings follow a similar agenda as General Assemblies, and are organized yearly for each region. They allow more students of the Region to gather, because the meeting is always in the Region, and the agenda is focused on regionally relevant topics.

== Awards ==
The IFMSA won on 3 October 2014 the Health Systems Award – Civil Organization. This award recognizes the organization that best employs social media to engage civil society in health systems-related dialogue. It recognizes the work the Federation has been doing to connect and engage with health communities around the world.

== See also ==
- American Medical Student Association (AMSA-USA)
- Australian Medical Students' Association (AMSA-AUS)
- International Association of Dental Students (IADS)
- International Pharmaceutical Students' Federation (IPSF)
- Iranian Medical Students Association (IMSA-IRAN)
- IFMSA-Kurdistan (IFMSA-Kurdistan)
