= Women in Global Health =

Organization and movement challenging power and privilege for gender equity in health

Women in Global Health is an organization and a movement that advocates for inclusive gender equity in health by challenging power and privilege. It is the largest community of its kind, with 65 chapters worldwide, working to put the power into the hands women of all backgrounds to create real change across the health sector.

== Background ==
The organization was founded in 2015 to promote gender equality for health workers and to push for fair governance in health administrations across the world, with a particular focus on the global south. In an interview for Forbes magazine in 2022, co-founder and former executive director Roopa Dhatt remarked:

“I approach this at both a systems and a personal level, focusing my energy on changing the systems that generate inequity and on a personal level, creating opportunities for authentic voices from the Global South in everything I do.”

== Women in global health leadership ==
Women form around 70% of the health workforce but only comprise 25% of senior roles. Around 70% of global health organizations are headed by men, and 80% of board chairs are men. Women's underrepresentation in health leadership means systems lose critical perspectives, knowledge and expertise, limiting the ability of health systems to keep communities healthy. In a policy action paper in 2021, feasible policy interventions for addressing the under representation of women was highlighted. If current trends persist, gender parity will not be reached among global health CEOs for 40 years.

== Women's unpaid work in health systems ==
The fight for gender equality in global health is not a marginal, sector-specific issue. Health is the largest employment sector and investment in the health workforce is a driver of economic growth. Women in health and social care contribute $3 trillion globally, of which almost 50% is unrecognized and unpaid. Bringing this unpaid care into the formal paid labor market would improve the economic and social position of women and girls and be a major economic multiplier for national and global GDP. Some of the world's poorest women and girls are effectively subsidizing health systems and missing out on opportunities to enter education and the formal labor market. In a report published in 2022 entitled Pay Women, Women in Global Health drew attention to the reality that women were subsidizing the true cost of public health programs around the world.

== COVID-19 pandemic ==
One of the many gender inequities in the health and care workforce that COVID-19 has exposed is around the fit and design of Personal Protective Equipment (PPE). The rapid onset and scale of COVID-19 led to shortages of PPE in most countries, causing preventable infection and mortality among healthcare workers and others on the front lines. Even though most health workers are women, manufacturing specifications for medical PPE are usually drawn up based on the male body and there have been many reports of PPE not designed for women's bodies. WGH undertook a global research project to document the challenges women health workers have faced and published its findings in a report entitled Fit For Women? Safe and Decent PPE for women health and care workers.

== World Health Assembly 2022 ==
In 2022, Women in Global Health was granted official relations status with the World Health Organization (WHO) and sent its first official delegation to the World Health Assembly in May 2022. The organization has engaged actively with WHO since the launch of the movement during the sidelines of the 68th World Health Assembly (2015). Its work to transform the systems, structures, and norms that perpetuate gender inequality in health are ongoing.

Highlights of the partnership include:

- Calling for gender equality to be on the agenda among WHO Director-General candidates (2016)
- Launching the call to action for gender equality in global health at the 140th WHO Executive Board meeting (2017)
- Launching the Gender Equity Hub co-chaired by WGH and WHO (2017)
- Organizing WHO's first informal consultation on gender for the 13th General Program of Work (2018)
- ‘Delivered by women, led by men’ report launched at the UN Commission on the Status of Women (2019)
- Launching the Alliance on Gender Equality and UHC with 200+ organizations (2019)
- Recognizing 100 outstanding women during the Year of the Nurse and Midwife (2020)
- Signing an MOU with WHO on International Women's Day (2021)
- ‘Closing the leadership gap’ paper launch (2021)
