= WomenLift Health =

Organization for women's career advancement

- Formation: 2019
- Website: Official website

WomenLift Health is a nonprofit organization aimed at working with partners around the world to accelerate the advancement of talented women into senior leadership by investing in mid-career women and influencing the environments in which they live and work. In 2019, with support from the Bill and Melinda Gates Foundation, WomenLift Health began building scalable platforms to deliver interventions supporting women's leadership in health. It has grown to include hubs in East Africa, South Asia, and North America, with South Africa coming soon. Its model is country-owned and -driven.
