= Outline of Rwanda =

Country in East Africa

The Flag of Rwanda

The Coat of arms of Rwanda

The location of Rwanda

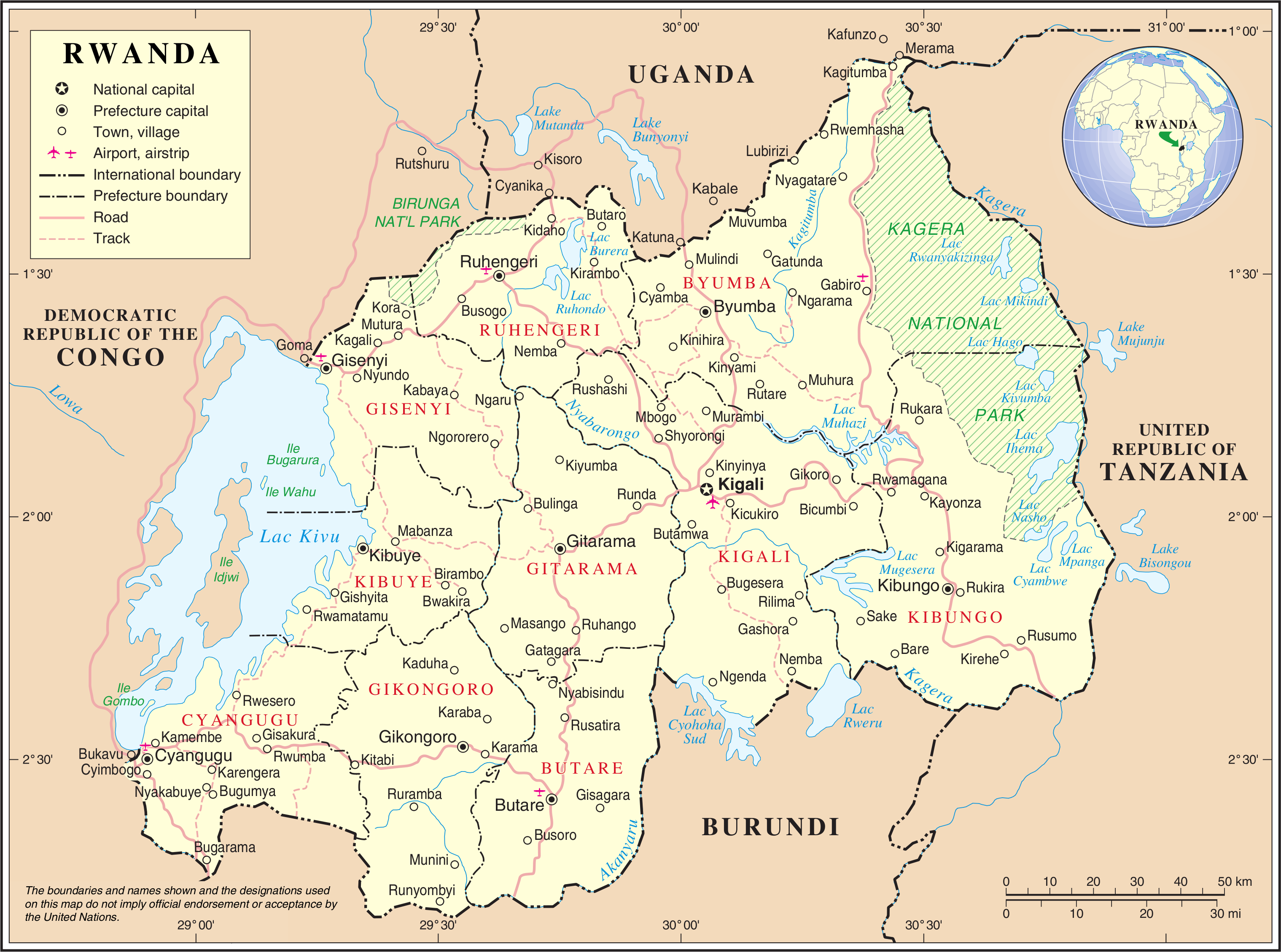
An enlargeable map of Rwanda

Rwanda is a small landlocked sovereign country located in East Africa, bordered by Uganda, Tanzania, Burundi, and the Democratic Republic of the Congo. Home to approximately 14 million people, Rwanda supports the densest population in continental Africa, with most of the population engaged in subsistence agriculture. A verdant country of fertile and hilly terrain, the small republic bears the title "Land of a Thousand Hills". The country attracted international concern for the infamous Rwandan genocide of 1994.

The following outline is provided as an overview of and topical guide to Rwanda:

== General reference ==
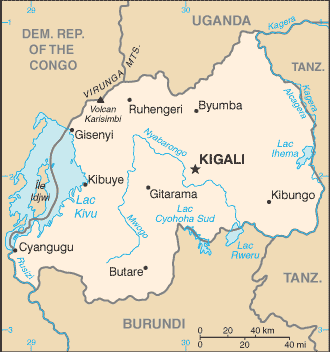
An enlargeable basic map of Rwanda

- Pronunciation: /ruˈɑːndə/ or /ruˈændə/
- Common English country name(s): Rwanda
- Official English country name(s): Republic of Rwanda
- Common endonym(s): Rwanda
- Official endonym(s): Republic of Rwanda (English), Repubulika y'u Rwanda (Kinyarwanda), République du Rwanda (French), Jamhuri ya Rwanda (Swahili)
- Adjectival(s): Rwandan
- Demonym(s): Rwandan(s)
- International rankings of Rwanda
- ISO country codes: RW, RWA, 646
- ISO region codes: See ISO 3166-2:RW
- Internet country code top-level domain: .rw

== Geography of Rwanda ==
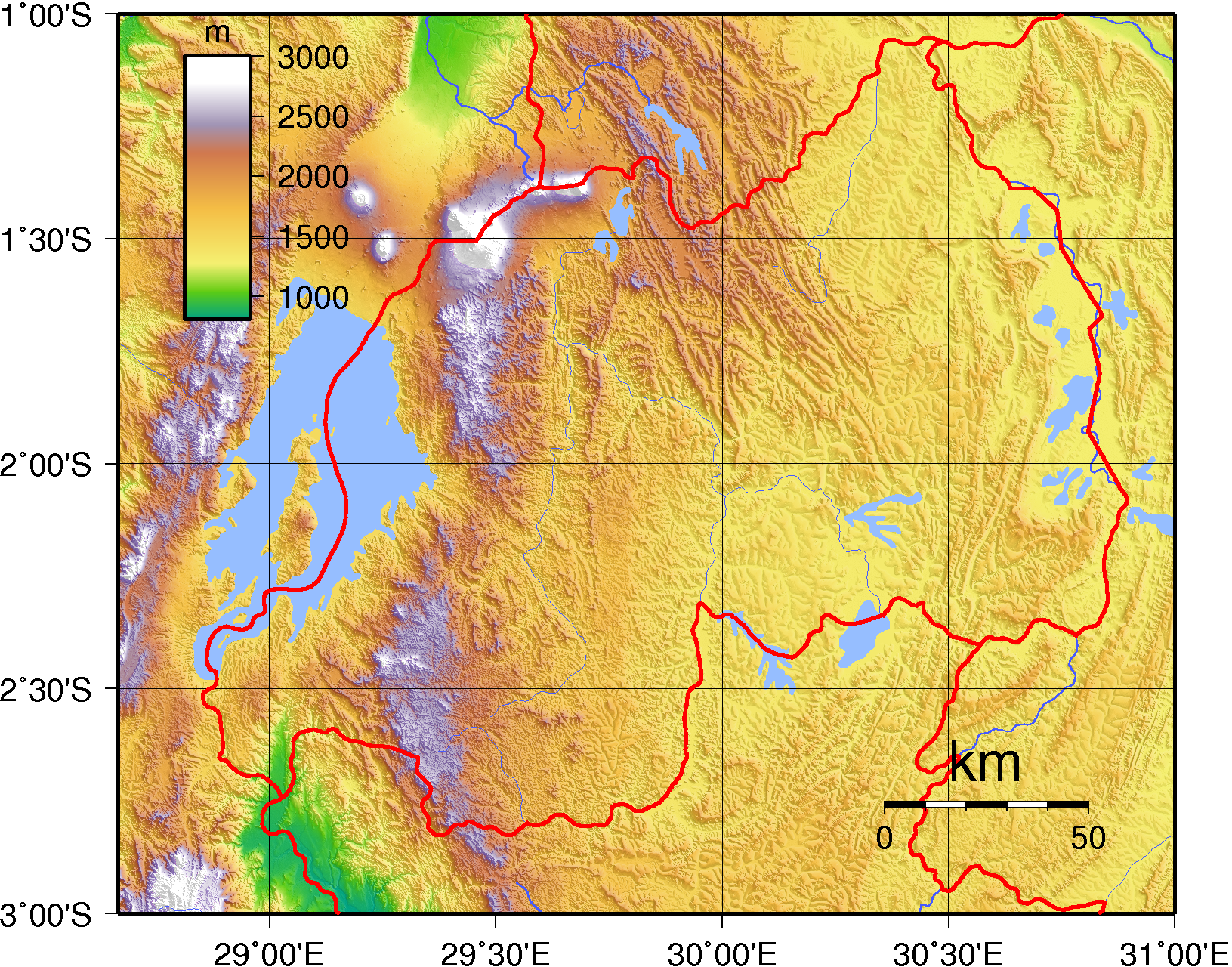
An enlargeable topographic map of Rwanda

- Rwanda is a landlocked country
- Location:
  - Southern Hemisphere and Eastern Hemisphere
  - Africa
    - East Africa
  - Time zone: Central Africa Time (UTC+02)
  - Extreme points of Rwanda:
    - Highest point: Mount Karisimbi – 4,519 m (14,826 ft)
    - Lowest point: Rusizi River – 950 m (3,117 ft)
  - Land boundaries: 930 km (580 mi)

Uganda – 172 km (107 mi)
Tanzania – 222 km (138 mi)
Burundi – 315 km (196 mi)
Democratic Republic of the Congo – 221 km (137 mi)

- Coastline: none (landlocked)

- Population of Rwanda: 14,104,969 – 76th most populous country
- Area of Rwanda: 26,338 km^{2} (10,169 sq mi)
- Atlas of Rwanda

=== Environment of Rwanda ===
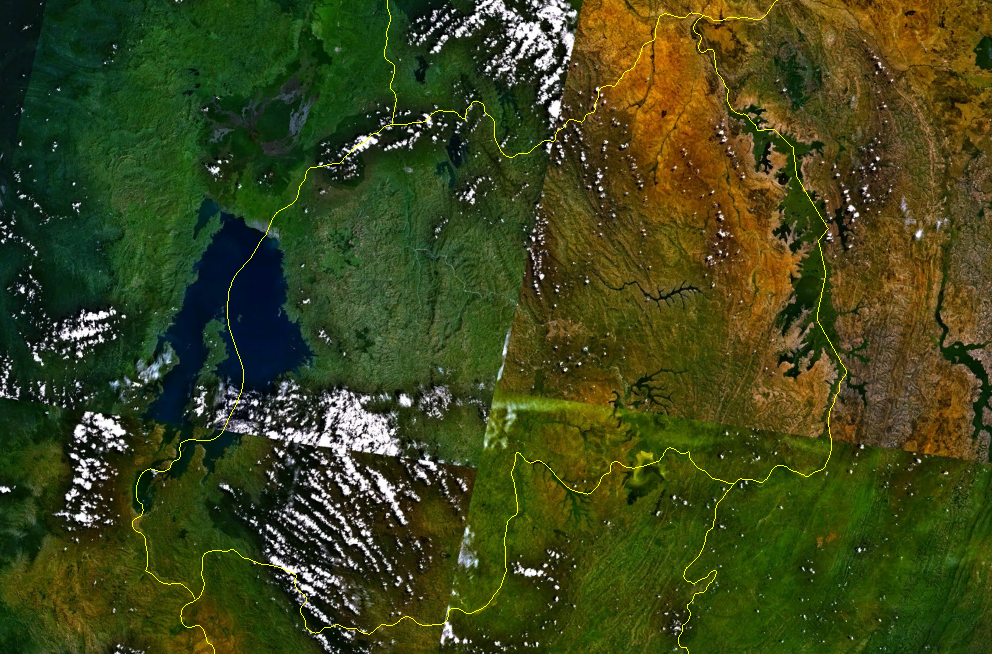
An enlargeable satellite image of Rwanda

- Climate of Rwanda
- Ecoregions in Rwanda
- Geology of Rwanda
- Wildlife of Rwanda
  - Fauna of Rwanda
    - Birds of Rwanda
    - Mammals of Rwanda

==== Natural geographic features of Rwanda ====
- Glaciers in Rwanda: none
- Lakes of Rwanda
- Mountains of Rwanda
  - Volcanoes in Rwanda
- Rivers of Rwanda
- World Heritage Sites in Rwanda: None

=== Regions of Rwanda ===
Regions of Rwanda

==== Ecoregions of Rwanda ====
List of ecoregions in Rwanda

- Ecoregions in Rwanda

==== Administrative divisions of Rwanda ====
Administrative divisions of Rwanda

- Provinces of Rwanda
  - Districts of Rwanda

=== Demography of Rwanda ===
Demographics of Rwanda

== Government and politics of Rwanda ==
- Form of government: Unitary, semi-presidential republic
- Capital of Rwanda: Kigali
- Elections in Rwanda
- Political parties in Rwanda

=== Branches of the government of Rwanda ===
==== Executive branch of the government of Rwanda ====
- Head of state: President of Rwanda, Paul Kagame
- Head of government: Prime Minister of Rwanda, Justin Nsengiyumva
- Cabinet of Rwanda

==== Legislative branch of the government of Rwanda ====
- Parliament of Rwanda (bicameral)
  - Upper house: Senate of Rwanda
  - Lower house: Chamber of Deputies

==== Judicial branch of the government of Rwanda ====
- Supreme Court of Rwanda

=== Foreign relations of Rwanda ===
- Diplomatic missions in Rwanda
- Diplomatic missions of Rwanda

==== International organization membership ====
The Republic of Rwanda is a member of:

- African, Caribbean, and Pacific Group of States (ACP)
- African Development Bank Group (AfDB)
- African Union (AU)
- African Union/United Nations Hybrid operation in Darfur (UNAMID)
- Common Market for Eastern and Southern Africa (COMESA)
- Commonwealth of Nations (C)
- East African Community (EAC)
- East African Development Bank (EADB)
- Economic Community of the Great Lakes Countries (CEPGL)
- Food and Agriculture Organization (FAO)
- Group of 77 (G77)
- International Atomic Energy Agency (IAEA)
- International Bank for Reconstruction and Development (IBRD)
- International Civil Aviation Organization (ICAO)
- International Criminal Police Organization (Interpol)
- International Development Association (IDA)
- International Federation of Red Cross and Red Crescent Societies (IFRCS)
- International Finance Corporation (IFC)
- International Fund for Agricultural Development (IFAD)
- International Labour Organization (ILO)
- International Monetary Fund (IMF)
- International Olympic Committee (IOC)
- International Organization for Migration (IOM)
- International Organization for Standardization (ISO) (correspondent)
- International Red Cross and Red Crescent Movement (ICRM)
- International Telecommunication Union (ITU)
- International Telecommunications Satellite Organization (ITSO)
- International Trade Union Confederation (ITUC)
- Inter-Parliamentary Union (IPU)
- Multilateral Investment Guarantee Agency (MIGA)
- Nonaligned Movement (NAM)
- Organisation internationale de la Francophonie (OIF)
- Organisation for the Prohibition of Chemical Weapons (OPCW)
- Permanent Court of Arbitration (PCA)
- United Nations (UN)
- United Nations Conference on Trade and Development (UNCTAD)
- United Nations Educational, Scientific, and Cultural Organization (UNESCO)
- United Nations High Commissioner for Refugees (UNHCR)
- United Nations Industrial Development Organization (UNIDO)
- United Nations Interim Security Force for Abyei (UNISFA)
- United Nations Mission in the Central African Republic and Chad (MINURCAT)
- United Nations Mission in the Sudan (UNMIS)
- United Nations Multidimensional Integrated Stabilization Mission in Mali (MINUSMA)
- Universal Postal Union (UPU)
- World Confederation of Labour (WCL)
- World Customs Organization (WCO)
- World Federation of Trade Unions (WFTU)
- World Health Organization (WHO)
- World Intellectual Property Organization (WIPO)
- World Meteorological Organization (WMO)
- World Tourism Organization (UNWTO)
- World Trade Organization (WTO)

=== Law and order in Rwanda ===
- Constitution of Rwanda
- Human rights in Rwanda
  - LGBT rights in Rwanda
- Law enforcement in Rwanda

=== Military of Rwanda ===
- Command
  - Commander-in-chief: President of Rwanda
  - Ministry of Defence
- Forces
  - Army
  - Navy: none (landlocked country)
  - Air Force

=== Local government in Rwanda ===
- Administrative divisions of Rwanda
  - Provinces of Rwanda
  - Districts of Rwanda

== History of Rwanda ==
History of Rwanda

- Current events of Rwanda
- Great Lakes refugee crisis
- Kingdom of Rwanda
  - Kings of Rwanda
- Rwandan Civil War
- Rwandan genocide

== Culture of Rwanda ==
Culture of Rwanda

- Cuisine of Rwanda
- Languages of Rwanda
- Media in Rwanda
- National symbols of Rwanda
  - Coat of arms of Rwanda
  - Flag of Rwanda
  - National anthem of Rwanda
- Prostitution in Rwanda
- Public holidays in Rwanda
- Religion in Rwanda
  - Hinduism in Rwanda
  - Islam in Rwanda
- World Heritage Sites in Rwanda: None

=== Art in Rwanda ===
- Literature of Rwanda
- Music of Rwanda

=== Sports in Rwanda ===
Sports in Rwanda

- Football in Rwanda
- Rwanda at the Olympics

== Economy and infrastructure of Rwanda ==
Economy of Rwanda

- Economic rank, by nominal GDP (2007): 148th (one hundred and forty eighth)
- Banking in Rwanda
  - National Bank of Rwanda
- Communications in Rwanda
  - Internet in Rwanda
- Companies of Rwanda
- Currency of Rwanda: Franc
  - ISO 4217: RWF
- Energy in Rwanda
- Health care in Rwanda
- Mining in Rwanda
- Rwanda Stock Exchange
- Tourism in Rwanda
- Transport in Rwanda
  - Airports in Rwanda
  - Rail transport in Rwanda
- Water supply and sanitation in Rwanda

== Education in Rwanda ==
- Education in Rwanda
  - List of schools in Rwanda

== See also ==
Rwanda

- List of Rwanda-related topics
- List of international rankings
- Member state of the United Nations
- Outline of Africa
- Outline of geography
