= Healthcare in Rwanda =

Healthcare in Rwanda has seen great improvement in recent decades. Rwanda operates a universal health care system, and is considered to have one of the highest-quality health systems in Africa.

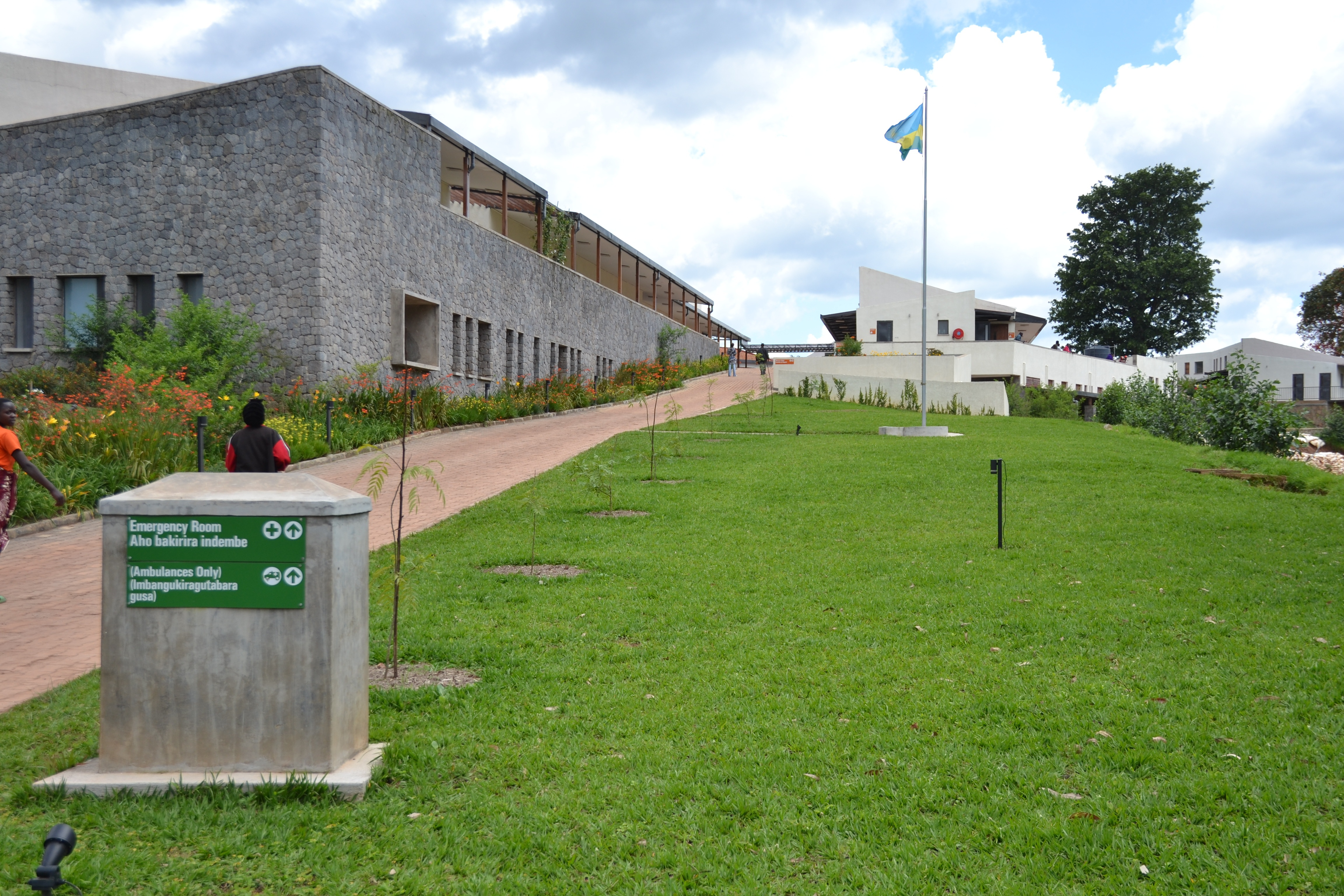
Butaro Hospital at Burera, Northern Province

== History ==
In the pre-genocide era before 1994, Rwanda's healthcare was supported by the Bamako Initiative which was sponsored by UNICEF and WHO and adopted by African ministers of health in 1987. Progress was started towards decentralising the health management system, first to the Province level and then to the district level. Unfortunately this was disrupted by the 1994 genocide, which crippled the healthcare system alongside the economy. In the post genocide period, Rwanda has had an uphill climb in the recovery of its health system as well as its economy. It has since built one of the best healthcare systems in the region. In 2008, the government spent 9.7% of national expenditure on healthcare, compared with 3.2% in 1996.

== Health insurance system ==
Health insurance became mandatory for all individuals in 2008; in 2010 over 90% of the population was covered. In 2012, only about 4% were uninsured.

President Kagame made healthcare one of the priorities for the Vision 2020 development programme, boosting spending on health care to 6.5% of the country's gross domestic product in 2013, compared with 1.9% in 1996. The government has devolved the financing and management of healthcare to local communities, through a system of health insurance providers called mutuelles de santé. The mutuelles were piloted in 1999, and were made available nationwide by the mid-2000s, with the assistance of international development partners. The mutuelles are owned and managed at the level of Rwanda's thirty districts. There are separate national health insurance schemes for public servants and soldiers.

Premiums under the scheme were initially US$2 per annum; since 2011 the rate has varied on a sliding scale according to wealth, with the poorest citizens entitled to free health insurance and wealthiest paying premiums of US$8 per adult. As of 2014, more than 90% of the population was covered by the scheme. The government has also set up training institutes including the Kigali Health Institute (KHI), which was established in 1997 and is now part of the University of Rwanda. In 2005, President Kagame also launched a program known as The Presidents' Malaria Initiative. This initiative aimed to help get the most necessary materials for prevention of malaria to the most rural areas of Rwanda, such as mosquito nets and medication. Rwanda follows a universal health care model, which provides health insurance through the mutuelles de santé. The system is a community-based health insurance scheme, in which residents of a particular area pay premiums into a local health fund, and can draw from it when in need of medical care. Premiums are paid according to a sliding scale, with the poorest members of society entitled to use the service for free, while the wealthiest pay the highest premiums and are charged copays for treatment.

In 2012, about 45% of the system was funded by premium payments, with the rest coming from government funding and international donors.

== Quality ==
As of 2014, Rwanda's healthcare system operated 499 health centers, 680 health posts mainly involved with the outpatient programmes such as immunizations and family planning services, a number of dispensaries, and 42 district hospitals. The country's villages are served by a network of thousands of community health workers. There are four national referral hospitals, which are Kigali University Teaching Hospital, Butare University Teaching Hospital, King Faisal Hospital Kigali and the Rwanda Military Hospital. The most advanced of them is King Faisal Hospital, which is operated on a for-profit model by the government but participates in the national health insurance system, and therefore accepts patients referred to it by other hospitals and clinics. It is the most advanced hospital in Rwanda, equipped with a CT and MRI machine, two dialysis machines, and a wide range of surgical capabilities.

Rwanda's clinics are equipped with basic medical equipment and a cupboard of essential medications. The district hospitals offer basic surgical services, and all have a minimum of 15 doctors. Those in need of more advanced and specialized care are referred to one of the four national referral hospitals. There are five cancer treatment centers in the country, the Rwanda Cancer Centre at Butaro Hospital and facilities at the four national referral hospitals.

== Staffing ==
There is a network of 58,286 community health workers who provide primary care in the 14,837 villages and make referrals.

Rwanda has a shortage of medical professionals, with only 0.84 physicians, nurses, and midwives per 1,000 residents in 2013. The United Nations Development Programme (UNDP) is monitoring the country's health progress towards Millennium Development Goals 4–6, which relate to healthcare. A mid-2015 UNDP report noted that the country was not on target to meet goal 4 on infant mortality, despite it having "fallen dramatically"; the country is "making good progress" towards goal 5, which is to reduce by three quarters the maternal mortality ratio, while goal 6 is not yet met as HIV prevalence has not started falling.

Rwanda is participating in a seven-year program begun in 2013 that sees hundreds of medical educators and clinicians from 25 American medical institutions, including Harvard Medical School, Yale Medical School, and Duke Medical School, training Rwandan medical personnel and establish training and residency programs, which, after seven years, will be run by the Rwandan government with its own budget, teachers, and clinicians. Also to improve with better training.

== See also ==
- Health in Rwanda
- List of hospitals in Rwanda
- HIV/AIDS in Rwanda
- COVID-19 pandemic in Rwanda
- University Teaching Hospital of Kigali (CHUK)
- King Faysal Hospital Kigali
- Ndera Neuropsychiatric Teaching Hospital
