= University Teaching Hospital of Kigali =

University Teaching Hospital of Kigali (CHUK)

Geography
- Location: Nyarugenge, Kigali, Rwanda

Services
- Beds: 519

History
- Opened: 1918

Links
- Website: https://chuk.rw/
- Lists: Hospitals in Rwanda

The University Teaching Hospital of Kigali (CHUK) is a 519 bed-teaching hospital located in Kigali City, Rwanda. Founded in 1918 by Belgian colonialists, CHUK is the first and the biggest healthcare institution in Rwanda. CHUK has played a role in rebuilding Rwanda's healthcare after the genocide against Tutsi of 1994.

== History ==
CHUK's roots can be traced back to 1918, when the institution was initially founded by the Belgian military administration. The health institution was opened in an abandoned German building. Gustave Latinne, a Belgian military doctor was named the head the institution.

- 1918: CHUK began its journey as a health facility, providing essential healthcare services mainly to Belgians and to the local community.
- 1965: Recognizing the growing need for advanced medical care, CHUK evolved into a full-fledged hospital, expanding its capacity and services.
- April 1994 to 1996: During the genocide against the Tutsi, CHUK played multiple roles, serving as a health center, district hospital, and a referral hospital.
- 2000: A significant turning point occurred in CHUK's history with the enactment of Law No. 41/2000 on December 7, 2000. This law officially established and organized CHUK as a public institution with legal personality, and it was renamed the University teaching hospital of Kigali (CHUK).

== Facilities ==
CHUK is a public hospital known to provide services to ordinary Rwandans with community insurances. CHUK receives funding from the governments and international donors.

- Capacity: The hospital boasts a substantial capacity of 519 beds, making it one of the largest medical facilities in Rwanda.
- Referral Hospital: CHUK is the premier referral hospital in Rwanda, playing a vital role in handling complex medical cases and receiving patients referred from other healthcare facilities across the country.
- Medical Education: As a university teaching hospital, CHUK is involved in medical education and training. It serves as a teaching hospital for the University of Rwanda.

=== Future relocation ===
CHUK is relocating from its old Nyarugenge location to Masaka Hospital in Kicukiro District. According to the Ministry of Health, the move is due to the old facilities and inappropriate current location. Constructed under the funding of China, the new hospital will have over 800 beds, which is more than the current 519 beds

== See also ==
- King Faysal Hospital, Kigali
