= Senait =

Senait is an African given name. Notable people with the name include:

- Senait Ashenafi (born 1966), Ethiopian-born actress
- Senait Fisseha (born 1971), Ethiopian endocrinologist
- Senait Ghebrehiwet Mehari, Eritrean-born German singer
- Senait Mikešová, Wife of the former Czech Ambassador to Ethiopia and to the African Union H.E. Pavel Mikeš, and a promoter of Ethio-Czech cultural relations
- Senait Gebremichael Tesfagergish, Eritrean-born Natural language processing researcher
