= University of Global Health Equity =

University in Rwanda

Coordinates: 01°57′11″S 30°05′35″E

- Type: Private
- Established: 2005
- Parent institution: Partners In Health
- Affiliations: Cummings Foundation, Bill & Melinda Gates Foundation, Harvard Medical School, Tufts University, Government of Rwanda
- Chancellor: Dr. Jim Yong Kim
- Vice-Chancellor: Prof. Philip Cotton
- Location: Butaro, Rwanda
- Campus: Rural
- Website: ughe.org

University of Global Health Equity (UGHE) is a health sciences university in Rwanda. An initiative of Partners In Health, UGHE is a private, not-for-profit, accredited institution.

Catalytic partners that have helped to launch the University include: Cummings Foundation, Bill & Melinda Gates Foundation, and the Government of Rwanda. The Cummings Foundation committed an initial $15 million for Phase I of the University and was instrumental in raising matching funds from other sources.

== History ==
In 2013, the Government of Rwanda and Partners In Health were considering guilding a medical school next to Butaro Hospital. At that same time, Joyce and Bill Cummings, founders of the Cummings Foundation in Woburn, Massachusetts, visited Rwanda for the ribbon-cutting of the Butaro Outpatient Cancer Infusion Center, whose construction had been funded by the Cummings Foundation. During their visit, the Cummings shared an expanded vision for the proposed medical school that would be "pan-African" and would include multiple health science disciplines, including veterinary medicine, dentistry and nursing.

Paul Farmer responded to this idea by writing in an email, "What a great vision, and one that squares with the Rwandan vision of pulling people up by building a ‘knowledge’ economy while delivering care."

Launched in September 2015, UGHE is a new kind of university focused on delivering the highest quality of health care by addressing the critical social and systemic forces causing inequities and inefficiencies in health care delivery.

== Leadership ==
On April 3, 2017, UGHE appointed former Minister of Health of Rwanda, Agnes Binagwaho, MD, M(Ped), PhD, as Vice Chancellor of the University. As Vice Chancellor of UGHE, Professor Binagwaho oversees the expansion of the University’s education and research programs, cultivation of global partnerships, and further development of its Butaro campus in northern Rwanda. Dr. Agnes retired on November 4, 2022 and Dr. Joel Mubiligi assumed the role of Interim Vice Chancellor in addition to being Executive Director of PIH Rwanda. UGHE co-founder Dr. Paul Farmer died suddenly on February 21, 2022 while serving students and patients in Rwanda. His long time friend and PIH co-founder, Dr. Jim Yong Kim, was named Chancellor in October 2022.

=== Master of Science in Global Health Delivery ===
Launched in September 2015, the Master of Science in Global Health Delivery (MGHD) is UGHE’s flagship academic program.

=== Bachelor of Medicine, Bachelor of Surgery ===
UGHE’s joint Bachelor of Medicine, Bachelor of Surgery/Master of Science in Global Health Delivery (MBBS/MGHD) is a six and a half-year, bachelor’s level medical degree coupled with a master’s level global health degree.

=== Executive Education ===
UGHE’s Executive Education certificate courses develop professionals using critical competencies central to strengthening health care delivery systems.

=== Board of Directors ===
The university's board of directors consists of:

- Ophelia Dahl
- Sheila Davis
- Senait Fisseha
- Joseph Rhatigan
- Jim Yong Kim
- Dr. Joel M. Mubiligi
- Lesley King
- Carole B. Segal
- Paulin Basinga

== Campus development ==
In 2016, UGHE began construction on its first permanent campus in Butaro, Rwanda. Completed in January 2019, the campus was inaugurated by the President of Rwanda, Paul Kagame. The university houses classrooms, teaching laboratories, a clinical simulation center, and information commons, as well as administrative, dining, and lodging facilities for staff, students, and faculty. As the university grows, a second campus will be added in Kigali at Masaka.

The university is composed of complementary rural and urban campuses. In December 2016, UGHE began construction on the 250-acre Butaro academic campus, which is embedded in a rural primary health care delivery system. The first phase of the campus opened in 2018 with classrooms, administrative buildings, a library, and dorms. The urban campus will be located in Masaka Sector, Kicukiro District in the Rwandan capital of Kigali, the heart of a planned “medical city”. In addition to leveraging two existing clinical facilities – Butaro Hospital and Masaka Hospital in Kigali – UGHE will utilize PIH-supported sites across Rwanda to enable a breadth of educational opportunities in clinical and delivery settings. These campuses were designed by MASS Design and Shepley Bulfinch, one of the oldest architecture firms in continuous practice in the United States.
