= King Faisal Hospital =

King Faisal Hospital may refer to:

- King Faisal Specialist Hospital and Research Centre, in Riyadh, Saudi Arabia
- King Faisal Hospital, Mecca, Saudi Arabia
- King Faisal Hospital (Kigali), Rwanda
