= Rwanda Cancer Centre =

Coordinates: 01°24′33″S 29°50′27″E

- Rwanda Ministry of Health

Geography
- Location: Butaro, Burera District, Northern Province, Rwanda

Organisation
- Care system: Public
- Type: Cancer Treatment, Research and Teaching
- Affiliated university: University of Global Health Equity

History
- Opened: July 1, 2012 (age 13)

Links
- Other links: Butaro District Hospital

Butaro Hospital Cancer Center, or Butaro Cancer Centre of Excellence, is a public, specialized, tertiary care medical facility owned by the Rwanda Ministry of Health.

== Location ==
The facility is located adjacent to Butaro District Hospital, in the sector of Butaro, Burera District, in the Northern Province of Rwanda, approximately 96 kilometres (60 mi), by road, north-west of Kigali, the capital city of Rwanda. The geographical coordinates of the facility are:1°24'33.0"S, 29°50'27.0"E (Latitude:-1.409167; Longitude:29.840833).

== Overview ==
Butaro Cancer Centre is a cancer treatment, research and teaching center, administered by Butaro District Hospital, and affiliated with medical school of University of Global Health Equity, both of which maintain campuses adjacent to the cancer center. Administratively, the cancer center is one of the specialized units of the hospital. It is the only specialized cancer unit in Rwanda's public healthcare system.

The establishment of the centre was informed by the high number of cancer patients, primarily from rural areas, who present late in the disease cycle, when treatment choices are limited and are less effective. Butaro Hospital and Butaro Cancer Center of Excellence were constructed and are operated by the Rwanda government and a consortium of international development partners, including Partners In Health (PIH), a Boston-based non-profit organization.

== History ==
Butaro District hospital was commissioned on 25 January 2011. In 2012, the hospital began offering cancer treatment in a ward designated as Butaro Cancer Center. As of 2018, nearly 4,900 cancer patients had received care at the hospital, during the first six years of the center. During the same time, 66 nurses had received specialized training in cancer care at the facility.

== See also ==
- List of hospitals in Rwanda
