= Etienne Karita =

Rwandan scientist and researcher

Etienne Karita is a Rwandan scientist who has been researching HIV/AIDS in Rwanda since the mid-1980s. He has held numerous leadership positions in different organizations that are working to control HIV in Rwanda. Some of his work is concentrated on preventing mother to child transmission of HIV and in collaboration with Projet San Francisco, he has studied HIV in discordant couples.

== Education ==
Karita earned his MD from the National University of Rwanda in Kigali, the capital of Rwanda. In 1995, he completed his master's degree in molecular biology at the University of Brussels in Belgium, studying with Peter Piot, and then a master of public health in epidemiology at the University of Alabama in Birmingham. He is currently affiliated with Emory University as the country director for Projet San Francisco in Rwanda.

== Research and work ==
=== Earlier research on HIV ===
Karita has co-authored on numerous research papers that studied HIV infection and transmission in Rwanda. His work with Projet San Francisco, also called the Rwandan Zambia HIV Research Group (RZHRG), is focused on providing counseling and testing for discordant couples. The findings in some of the publications were used to suggest effective control programs in Rwanda. Project San Francisco was founded in Kigali in 1986, but when the Rwandan genocide began in 1994, many of the researchers relocated and began a clinic in Lusaka, Zambia. When Karita returned to Rwanda after the genocide, he became the founding director of the National Reference Laboratory for Retroviral Infectionsand was named the head of Rwanda's National AIDS Control Program. The Rwandan genocide was accompanied by the rape of thousands of women and the spread of HIV to them, leading to many who were unable to afford treatment. Karita was also the first Technical Advisor in Rwanda for the Elizabeth Glaser Pediatric AIDS Foundation (EGPAF), which is an organization aiming to end AIDS among children and prevent mother to child transmission. The EGPAF ended their partnership with the Ministry of Health in Rwanda in 2019 because of the reduction of mother to child transmission in the country.

=== Recent work ===
Karita has been the principal investigator for recent HIV vaccination clinical trials in Rwanda for the past few years. One research article that he published analyzed how HIV health care has improved since the genocide. In 2017, he was one of the recipients for the SANTHE (the Sub-Saharan African Network for TB/HIV Research Excellence) grants for his research on HIV among high-risk populations, such as female sex workers. He is also on the Consortium Steering Committee and a site principal investigator for SANTHE. Karita was co-chair of the scientific programme committee at the International Conference on AIDS and STIs in Africa (ICASA) in 2019, which is a conference where scientists share their research and expertise. The past few years, Karita has been working on the Umurinzi Ebola Vaccination Program to prevent the spread of Ebola, but the vaccinations were paused in 2020 while the government's main focus was on COVID-19. In addition to being the country director of Projet San Francisco in Rwanda, he is currently the vice chairperson on the board of directors of the Rwanda Biomedical Centre, which conducts research to improve health care in Rwanda.
