= Geology of Rwanda =

The geology of Rwanda is dominated by Mesoproterozoic metasedimentary rocks, primarily quartzites, sandstones, and shales of the Burundian Supergroup. These are intruded locally by granite of the Kibaran Belt, which includes four distinct granite types. In eastern Rwanda, Palaeoproterozoic “older granites” occur with granitic gneisses and migmatites. In the northwest and southwest, Neogene to Holocene volcanic rocks associated with the Virunga volcanic field include highly alkaline lavas. Quaternary alluvium and lake sediments are found in rift-related basins along the Western Branch of the East African Rift, particularly on the eastern shore of Lake Kivu, and in major river valleys.

== Geohazards ==
Toxic gas emitted from the Virunga volcanoes have been noted.

== Economic geology ==
A significant portion of Rwanda's economy is based on mineral extraction. Rwanda is the foremost producer of tungsten in Africa, producing 70% of Africa's total output. Rwanda is Africa's second highest producer of tin and coltan, accounting for 20% and 30% of the country's output, respectively. Rwanda also produces 9% of the world's tantalum. Rwanda produces gemstones. Even though a substantial portion of the country's economy is based on mineral extraction, Rwanda has in the past shut down mineral extraction due to environmental concerns.

Prior to 2006, natural gas was extracted from Lake Kivu. A disagreement between the oil company and the Government of Rwanda has suspended operations. In this region, reserves of helium rich methane is estimated to be 56.65 billion m^{3}. Although petroleum extraction occurs in the country, it imports more than it exports.
