= Demographics of Rwanda =

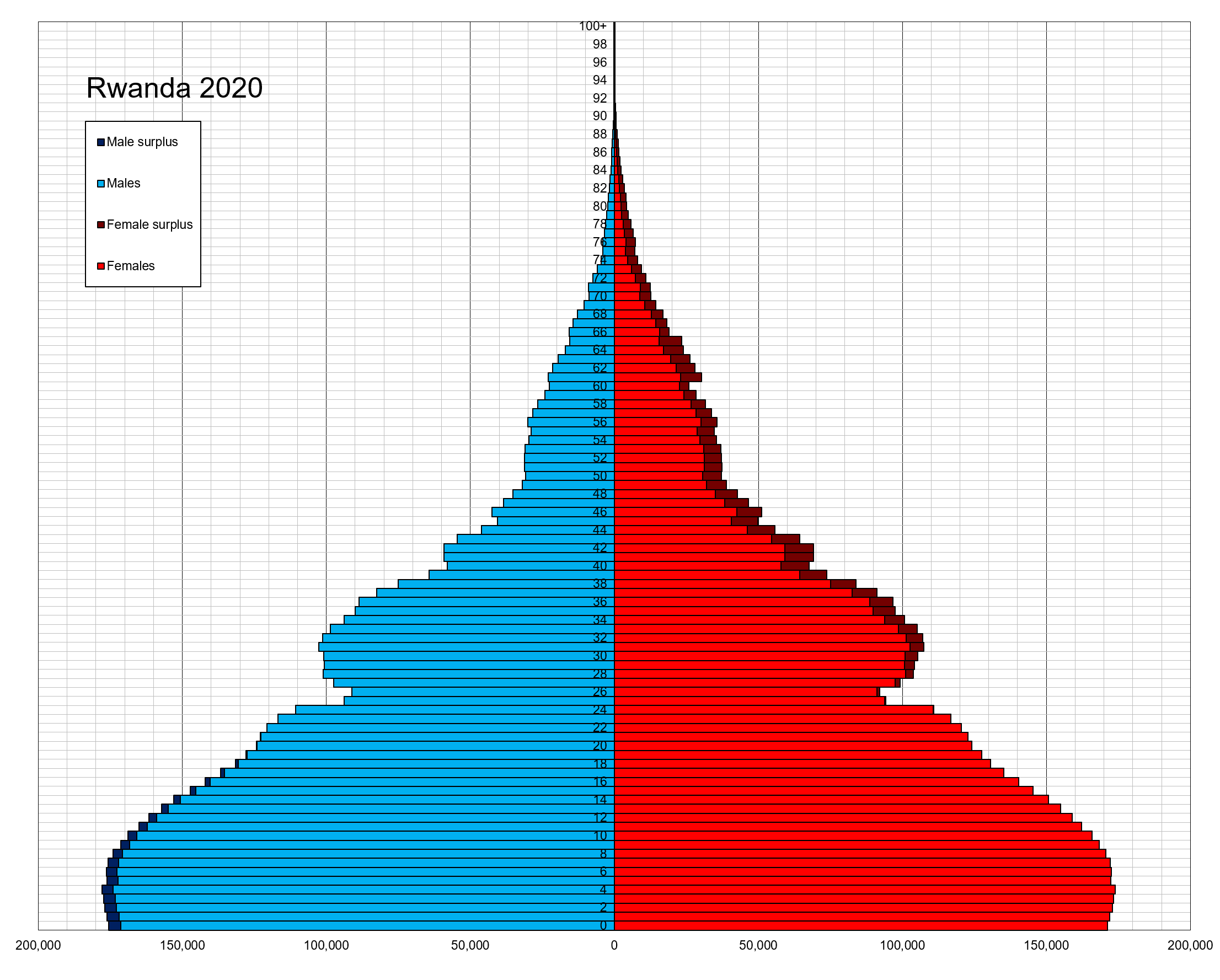
Rwanda population pyramid in 2020

Demographic features of the population of Rwanda include population density, ethnicity, education level, health of the populace, economic status, religious affiliations and other aspects.

Rwanda's population density is among the highest in Sub-Saharan Africa at 500 inhabitants per square kilometre (1,300/sq mi). This country has few villages, and nearly every family lives in a self-contained compound on a hillside. The urban concentrations are grouped around administrative centers.

Over half of the adult population is literate, and approximately 48% have received secondary education.

== Population ==
A graph showing the historical population of Rwanda.

In 1950, Rwanda had a very narrow population pyramid, with less than 250,000 males and females between 0–10 years old. The graph only gets narrower as it goes up with few people living past 50 years of age. In 2017, the population of Rwanda increased dramatically from 1950 with about 750,000 people between 0–20 years old; the graph remains very narrow in the older ages section but has improved from 1950. By 2050, it is predicted that more people will be living longer and the structure will broaden overall. By 2100, it is predicted that there will be more people aged between 30 and 60 than between 0–20, as previous years have shown.

According to the 2022 revision of the World Population Prospects the total population was 13,461,888 in 2021, compared to only 2,072,000 in 1950. The proportion of children below the age of 15 in 2010 was 42.6%, 54.7% were between 15 and 65 years of age, and 2.7% was 65 years or older.

Population
	Total population (in thousands)	Population aged 0–14 (%)	Population aged 15–64 (%)	Population aged 65+ (%)
1950	2,072	45.1	52.3	2.6
1955	2,386	46.3	50.8	2.9
1960	2,771	48.1	49.1	2.8
1965	3,221	47.8	49.5	2.7
1970	3,749	47.8	49.7	2.5
1975	4,390	47.7	49.9	2.4
1980	5,179	48.1	49.7	2.2
1985	6,081	48.9	49.1	2.0
1990	7,110	49.1	48.7	2.2
1995	5,570	48.4	49.3	2.3
2000	8,098	45.4	52.0	2.6
2005	9,202	42.4	55.0	2.7
2010	10,624	42.6	54.7	2.7
2012	10,516	41.16	55.65	3.19

=== Structure of the population ===
Population Estimates by Sex and Age Group (01.VII.2012) (Data refer to national projections.):

Age group	Male	Female	Total	%
Total	5,342,112	5,691,029	11,033,141	100
0–4	973,447	957,104	1,930,551	17.50
5–9	770,292	763,709	1,534,001	13.90
10–14	608,836	621,378	1,230,213	11.15
15–19	552,629	568,101	1,120,730	10.16
20–24	525,485	550,486	1,075,971	9.75
25–29	508,839	540,872	1,049,712	9.51
30–34	366,700	416,072	782,772	7.09
35–39	241,362	291,340	532,702	4.83
40–44	197,005	228,728	425,733	3.86
45–49	165,096	193,402	358,499	3.25
50–54	153,080	180,759	333,839	3.03
55–59	107,200	132,234	239,433	2.17
60–64	71,924	92,299	164,223	1.49
65–69	38,125	58,585	96,710	0.88
70–74	29,285	46,236	75,521	0.68
75–79	17,736	27,557	45,293	0.41
80+	15,071	22,178	37,239	0.34
Age group	Male	Female	Total	Percent
0–14	2,352,575	2,342,191	4,694,766	42.55
15–64	2,889,320	3,194,282	6,083,602	55.14
65+	100,217	154,556	254,773	2.31

Population Estimates by Sex and Age Group (01.VII.2019) (Projections based on the 2012 Population Census.):

Age group	Male	Female	Total	%
Total	6 008 384	6 366 013	12 374 397	100
0–4	844 359	828 304	1 672 663	13.52
5–9	764 098	763 070	1 527 168	12.34
10–14	757 029	764 727	1 521 756	12.30
15–19	669 226	685 385	1 354 611	10.95
20–24	559 045	580 570	1 139 615	9.21
25–29	502 947	533 613	1 036 560	8.38
30–34	464 011	487 289	951 301	7.69
35–39	399 641	420 377	820 018	6.63
40–44	272 423	311 994	584 417	4.72
45–49	193 490	233 052	426 542	3.45
50–54	158 153	188 719	346 872	2.80
55–59	143 753	177 803	321 557	2.60
60–64	113 795	145 306	259 101	2.09
65-69	75 204	99 427	174 630	1.41
70-74	41 032	60 933	101 965	0.82
75-79	24 110	41 408	65 519	0.53
80+	26 067	44 035	70 102	0.57
Age group	Male	Female	Total	Percent
0–14	2 365 486	2 356 101	4 721 587	38.16
15–64	3 476 485	3 764 109	7 240 594	58.51
65+	166 413	245 803	412 216	3.33

== Vital statistics ==
Population, fertility rate and net reproduction rate, United Nations estimates

Registration of vital events is in Rwanda not complete. The Population Department of the United Nations prepared the following estimates:

	Mid-year population	Live births	Deaths	Natural change	Crude birth rate (per 1000)	Crude death rate (per 1000)	Natural change (per 1000)	Total fertility rate (TFR)	Infant mortality (per 1000)	Life expectancy (in years)
1950	2 154 000	119 000	48 000	71 000	55.4	22.4	33.1	7.92	147.2	43.34
1951	2 227 000	123 000	50 000	73 000	55.3	22.5	32.8	7.94	146.7	43.44
1952	2 302 000	127 000	52 000	76 000	55.3	22.5	32.8	7.98	145.7	43.67
1953	2 379 000	131 000	53 000	78 000	55.2	22.4	32.8	8.02	144.7	43.88
1954	2 457 000	135 000	55 000	80 000	54.9	22.2	32.7	8.06	143.7	44.04
1955	2 538 000	138 000	56 000	83 000	54.5	22.0	32.5	8.09	142.6	44.25
1956	2 621 000	142 000	57 000	85 000	54.1	21.8	32.3	8.12	141.6	44.43
1957	2 706 000	145 000	57 000	88 000	53.6	21.1	32.5	8.14	138.1	45.16
1958	2 793 000	148 000	57 000	91 000	53.0	20.5	32.6	8.16	134.5	45.86
1959	2 881 000	151 000	57 000	94 000	52.4	19.8	32.6	8.18	131.1	46.62
1960	2 966 000	154 000	57 000	97 000	51.7	19.2	32.5	8.19	128.1	47.18
1961	3 047 000	155 000	57 000	98 000	50.8	18.7	32.1	8.19	125.8	47.66
1962	3 122 000	156 000	57 000	99 000	49.8	18.3	31.5	8.20	124.1	47.99
1963	3 191 000	157 000	66 000	91 000	48.9	20.6	28.3	8.20	124.9	44.07
1964	3 264 000	157 000	58 000	99 000	48.0	17.8	30.3	8.20	122.6	48.24
1965	3 349 000	159 000	59 000	100 000	47.5	17.6	29.9	8.20	122.6	48.28
1966	3 444 000	163 000	61 000	102 000	47.3	17.6	29.7	8.20	123.1	48.17
1967	3 549 000	168 000	62 000	106 000	47.4	17.6	29.8	8.20	123.9	48.09
1968	3 662 000	175 000	65 000	110 000	47.8	17.8	30.0	8.21	125.3	47.75
1969	3 778 000	183 000	68 000	114 000	48.3	18.1	30.2	8.22	126.9	47.40
1970	3 896 000	190 000	72 000	119 000	48.8	18.4	30.4	8.23	128.4	47.15
1971	4 015 000	197 000	75 000	122 000	49.1	18.6	30.5	8.23	129.9	46.83
1972	4 136 000	205 000	78 000	126 000	49.4	18.9	30.5	8.23	131.8	46.50
1973	4 259 000	212 000	83 000	130 000	49.8	19.4	30.4	8.23	134.3	45.91
1974	4 386 000	220 000	87 000	133 000	50.1	19.9	30.2	8.23	137.4	45.30
1975	4 516 000	228 000	92 000	136 000	50.4	20.4	30.0	8.22	140.3	44.70
1976	4 648 000	237 000	96 000	141 000	50.9	20.6	30.3	8.24	142.3	44.65
1977	4 783 000	245 000	98 000	147 000	51.2	20.5	30.7	8.24	142.3	44.80
1978	4 922 000	254 000	99 000	155 000	51.6	20.1	31.5	8.25	139.6	45.48
1979	5 074 000	264 000	98 000	167 000	52.1	19.2	32.9	8.23	134.2	46.66
1980	5 248 000	274 000	95 000	178 000	52.2	18.2	34.0	8.19	127.0	47.96
1981	5 442 000	285 000	93 000	192 000	52.3	17.1	35.3	8.16	118.9	49.42
1982	5 653 000	294 000	91 000	203 000	52.1	16.1	36.0	8.09	111.3	50.69
1983	5 859 000	302 000	91 000	212 000	51.5	15.4	36.1	7.99	105.5	51.32
1984	6 057 000	307 000	91 000	216 000	50.6	15.0	35.7	7.87	101.2	51.64
1985	6 267 000	310 000	92 000	218 000	49.5	14.6	34.9	7.73	97.9	51.73
1986	6 498 000	315 000	94 000	222 000	48.6	14.4	34.2	7.56	95.2	51.64
1987	6 736 000	322 000	96 000	226 000	47.8	14.3	33.5	7.39	93.0	51.48
1988	6 954 000	326 000	100 000	227 000	46.8	14.3	32.5	7.23	91.3	50.98
1989	7 142 000	327 000	104 000	223 000	45.7	14.6	31.1	7.06	91.2	50.22
1990	7 320 000	325 000	113 000	212 000	44.3	15.4	28.8	6.87	93.2	48.43
1991	7 486 000	323 000	124 000	200 000	43.0	16.5	26.6	6.71	97.7	46.52
1992	7 657 000	325 000	137 000	188 000	42.4	17.9	24.6	6.61	104.8	44.32
1993	7 905 000	330 000	152 000	177 000	42.1	19.4	22.6	6.51	113.2	42.17
1994	6 733 000	324 000	809 000	−485 000	41.5	103.5	−62.1	6.41	178.5	14.10
1995	5 687 000	224 000	111 000	113 000	41.0	20.4	20.6	6.32	129.4	39.97
1996	6 716 000	248 000	119 000	129 000	41.1	19.7	21.4	6.25	129.8	40.70
1997	7 667 000	310 000	148 000	162 000	41.1	19.6	21.4	6.18	129.1	40.64
1998	7 915 000	328 000	149 000	178 000	41.2	18.8	22.4	6.12	124.4	41.68
1999	8 010 000	331 000	138 000	193 000	41.1	17.1	24.0	6.01	118.3	44.62
2000	8 110 000	334 000	129 000	205 000	40.9	15.8	25.1	5.92	110.6	47.13
2001	8 224 000	330 007	123 000	214 000	40.8	14.8	25.9	5.84	101.7	49.02
2002	8 372 000	339 000	117 000	222 000	40.4	13.9	26.5	5.75	92.7	51.03
2003	8 568 000	344 000	110 000	235 000	40.1	12.8	27.4	5.67	84.2	53.37
2004	8 790 002	351 000	102 000	249 000	39.9	11.5	28.3	5.57	76.3	55.49
2005	9 026 000	357 000	95 000	261 000	39.5	10.5	28.9	5.44	69.0	57.32
2006	9 270 000	360 000	91 000	269 000	38.8	9.8	29.0	5.28	62.6	58.71
2007	9 523 000	362 000	88 000	275 000	38.0	9.2	28.8	5.10	57.2	59.97
2008	9 782 000	362 000	85 000	278 000	37.0	8.6	28.3	4.90	52.4	61.13
2009	10 044 000	361 000	83 000	278 000	35.9	8.3	27.7	4.72	48.4	61.96
2010	10 309 000	359 000	83 000	276 000	34.8	8.1	26.8	4.53	44.9	62.54
2011	10 577 000	356 000	83 000	273 000	33.7	7.8	25.8	4.36	41.7	63.26
2012	10 840 000	356 000	82 000	274 000	32.8	7.6	25.2	4.23	39.4	64.01
2013	11 101 000	360 000	81 000	279 000	32.4	7.3	25.1	4.16	37.6	64.43
2014	11 368 000	365 000	79 000	286 000	32.1	7.0	25.1	4.11	36.1	64.94
2015	11 643 000	371 000	78 000	293 000	31.8	6.7	25.1	4.08	34.8	65.30
2016	11 931 000	378 000	77 000	300 000	31.7	6.5	25.2	4.06	33.7	65.74
2017	12 230 000	384 000	78 000	306 000	31.4	6.4	25.0	4.03	32.7	65.94
2018	12 532 000	391 000	78 000	313 000	31.2	6.2	24.9	3.99	32.0	66.25
2019	12 835 000	395 000	79 000	316 000	30.8	6.1	24.6	3.94	31.0	66.44
2020	13 146 000	399 000	79 000	320 000	30.3	6.0	24.3	3.87	30.1	66.77
2021	13 355 000	392 000	83 000	310 000	29.4	6.2	23.2	3.84	29.2	66.9
2022	13 651 000	394 000	82 000	312 000	28.3	6.0	22.9	3.78	28.3	67.5
2023	13 954 000	396 000	83 000	313 000	28.3	5.9	22.4	3.70	27.5	67.8
2024					28.1	5.9	22.2	3.64		
2025					27.7	5.9	21.9	3.59		

=== Demographic and Health Surveys ===
Total Fertility Rate (TFR) (Wanted Fertility Rate) and Crude Birth Rate (CBR):

Year	Total			Urban			Rural		
Year	CBR	TFR	WFR	CBR	TFR	WFR	CBR	TFR	WFR
1992	40.0	6.23	4.2	38.0	4.51	3.3	41.0	6.33	4.3
2000	—N/a	5.8	4.7	—N/a	5.2	4.1	—N/a	5.9	4.8
2005	43.2	6.1	4.6	39.8	4.9	3.6	43.8	6.3	4.8
2007–08	39.2	5.5	3.7	37.4	4.7	3.3	39.6	5.7	3.8
2010	34.4	4.6	3.1	30.6	3.4	2.6	35.0	4.8	3.2
2014–15	32.6	4.2	3.1	34.3	3.6	2.7	32.3	4.3	3.2
2019-2020	31.8	4.1	3.1	32.4	3.4	2.8	31.6	4.3	3.2
2025	27.7	3.7	2.8	29.9	3.4	2.6	26.9	3.9	2.9

View source data.
View source data.
View source data.
View source data.

Fertility data as of 2014–15 (DHS Program):

Province	Total fertility rate	Percentage of women age 15–49 currently pregnant	Mean number of children ever born to women age 40–49
Kigali	3.6	6.9	4.6
South	4.0	6.9	5.0
West	4.6	7.4	5.9
North	3.7	6.3	5.6
East	4.6	8.4	5.9

=== Life expectancy ===
Historical development of life expectancy in Rwanda

Period	Life expectancy in Years	Period	Life expectancy in Years
1950–1955	40.0	1985–1990	48.1
1955–1960	41.5	1990–1995	23.7
1960–1965	43.0	1995–2000	44.7
1965–1970	44.1	2000–2005	50.6
1970–1975	44.6	2005–2010	60.1
1975–1980	45.8	2010–2020	65.2
1980–1985	49.8		

Source: UN

== Ethnic groups ==
The Rwandan population largely consists of three ethnic groups. The Hutus, who comprise the majority of the population (85%), are farmers of Bantu origin. The Tutsis (14% before the Genocide, probably less than 10% now) are a pastoral people who arrived in the area in the 15th century. Until 1959, they formed the dominant caste under a feudal system based on cattle-holding, and ruled in the pre-colonial Kingdom of Rwanda.

The Twa (pygmies) (1%) are thought to be the remnants of the earliest settlers of the region.

== Languages ==
Kinyarwanda is the national language of Rwanda and the first language of almost the entire population. Because many Rwandans are multilingual, the total literacy percentages exceed 100%. According to the 2022 Census, the general language literacy among the resident population aged 15 and above is as follows:

- Kinyarwanda (official universal Bantu vernacular) 78.3%
- English (official) 21.2%
- French (official) 8.2%
- Swahili (or Kiswahili used in commercial centres) 4.0%
- Other 0.07%

=== Language Breakdown Distribution ===
To illustrate how these languages intersect across the population, the detailed multilingual breakdown of exclusive and mixed language literacy is distributed as follows:

Language Literacy Breakdown Distribution
Language(s) of Literacy	Percentage
Kinyarwanda	54.0%
Kinyarwanda & English	14.1%
Kinyarwanda, English & French	4.1%
Kinyarwanda & French	1.9%
Kinyarwanda, English, French & Swahili	1.5%
Kinyarwanda, English & Swahili	1.0%
Kinyarwanda & Swahili	0.7%
Kinyarwanda, French & Swahili	0.4%
Kinyarwanda, English, French & Swahili & Other	0.2%
Kinyarwanda & Other	0.1%
Kinyarwanda, English & Other	0.1%
Kinyarwanda, English, French & Other	0.1%
Kinyarwanda, English, Swahili & Other	0.1%
Other	0.1%
None	21.2%
Total	100%

Note: Census data reveals an asymmetric relationship between English and French as a second language of literacy in Rwanda, where Kinyarwanda is the near-universal first. While French literacy (8.2%) is largely shared with the English-literate population (5.9% overlap), only 2.3% of Rwandans are literate in French but not in English. English literacy (21.2%) extends considerably further: a minimum of 14.1% of Rwandans are literate in English alone, with no French. This positions English as the clearly predominant second language of literacy nationwide.

== Religion ==
- Protestant 57.7% (includes Adventist 12.6%)
- Roman Catholic 38.2%
- Muslim 2.1%
- Other 1% (includes traditional, Jehovah's Witness)
- None 1.1% (2019-20 est.)

== See also ==
- Silas Niyibizi
