= Rwanda National Police =

Law enforcement agency

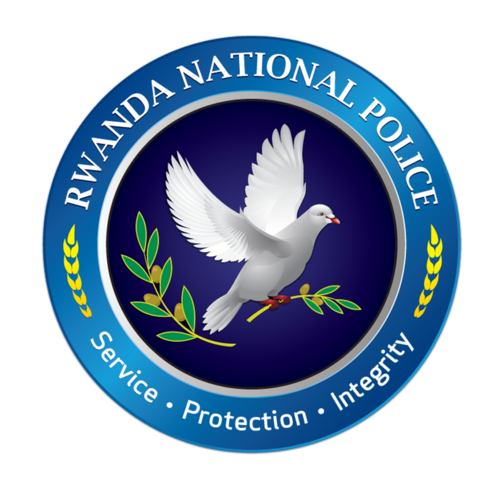
The logo of the RNP.

The Rwanda National Police is the national police service of Rwanda.

== History ==
The service was created on 16 June 2000 by law No. 09 of 2000 and merged three earlier forces, the Gendarmerie Nationale of the Ministry of Defence, the Communal Police of the Ministry of Internal Affairs and the Judicial Police of the Ministry of Justice. Currently Felix Namuhoranye is the inspector general of the Rwanda national police.

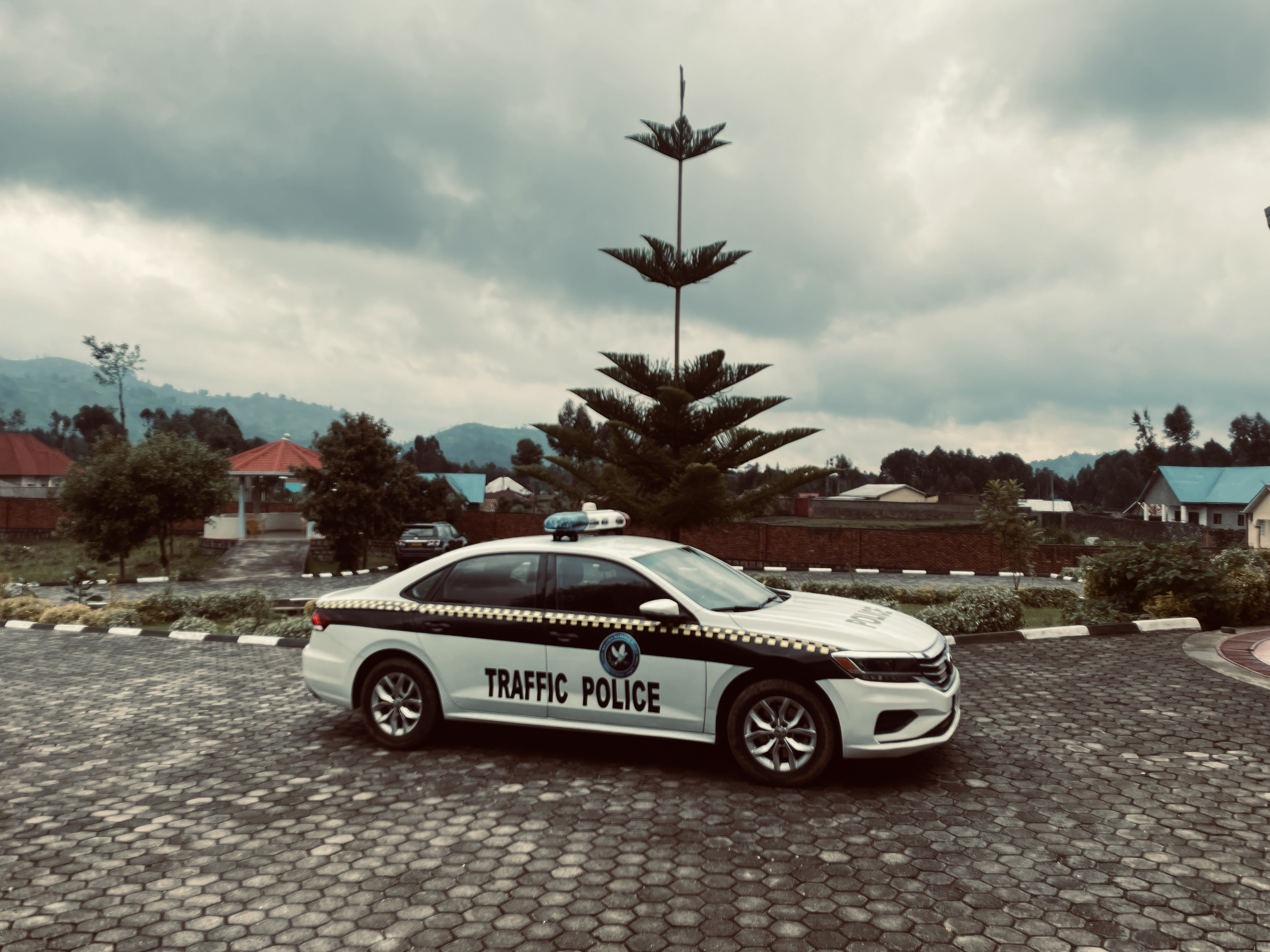
Rwanda Police car

== See also ==
- Law enforcement in Rwanda
