= Silas Niyibizi =

Silas Niyibizi (April 1, 1942 – February 21, 2011) was a Rwandan demographer, public servant and academic.

== Early life ==
Silas Niyibizi was born on April 1, 1942, in Muganza - Kayenzi (Gitarama, Southern Rwanda) in a modest family of rural farmers. After attending primary school in his home village, he went to Nyanza (Southern Rwanda) for secondary studies at the Collège Christ Roi Latin-Greek section (1957–1964). From 1964 to 1967 he studied at the National University of Rwanda in the department of Social and Economic Sciences (Département des Sciences Économiques et Sociales). There he obtained a Degree in Economic and Social Sciences.

From 1967 to 1969 he specialized in demography at the Université de Montréal (Canada) with a M.Sc. in demographic sciences, thus becoming the first ever Rwandan demographer.

== Career ==
During his career from 1969 to 1999, Niyibizi did extensive demographic research, primarily focusing on the social issues generated by the rapid growth of the Rwandan population.

He returned to Rwanda after obtaining his demographic degree in 1969, where the Rwandan Ministry of Planning employed him to found the Statistics department (1969–1971). Niyibizi then transferred to the National University of Rwanda (NUR, Butare - Southern Province) as a full-time lecturer in Demographic and Statistics Studies (1971–1976), making him the first graduate of the NUR to be a lecturer there.

From 1976 to 1977 Niyibizi served as permanent secretary in the Ministry of Sports, before being tasked to prepare and manage the First Rwandan Census of Population and Housing (1978) and coordinate its after-results analysis (1978 to 1987). In 1980 he co-founded the Office National de la Population – ONAPO (National Office of the Population), where he served as Senior Demographer from 1987 to 1994, with a short stint as Senior Advisor in the country’s second National Census of Population and Housing (1991).

Contrary to many of his peers among the first Rwandan academics, he seems to have not taken part in the tumultuous political period preceding the 1994 genocide (nor had he ever occupied a political position). This aberrant political anonymity could be explained by his socialist ideals, peaceful dialogue and opposition to military involvement in politics, a mixture that could not please the Military Regime that ruled Rwanda at the prime of his career.

After the 1994 genocide, Niyibizi worked to rebuild the country's decimated academia. He remained a lecturer at NUR until he retired at the age of 57 in 1999. In his retirement he also contributed to the success of the third (and first post-genocide) National Census of Population and Housing (2002), as National Consultant. He also, during his retirement, taught statistics and social planning at the Université Catholique de Kabgayi from 2001 to 2006.
