= Ndera Hospital =

Ndera Neuropsychiatric Teaching Hospital
- Rwanda Ministry of Health
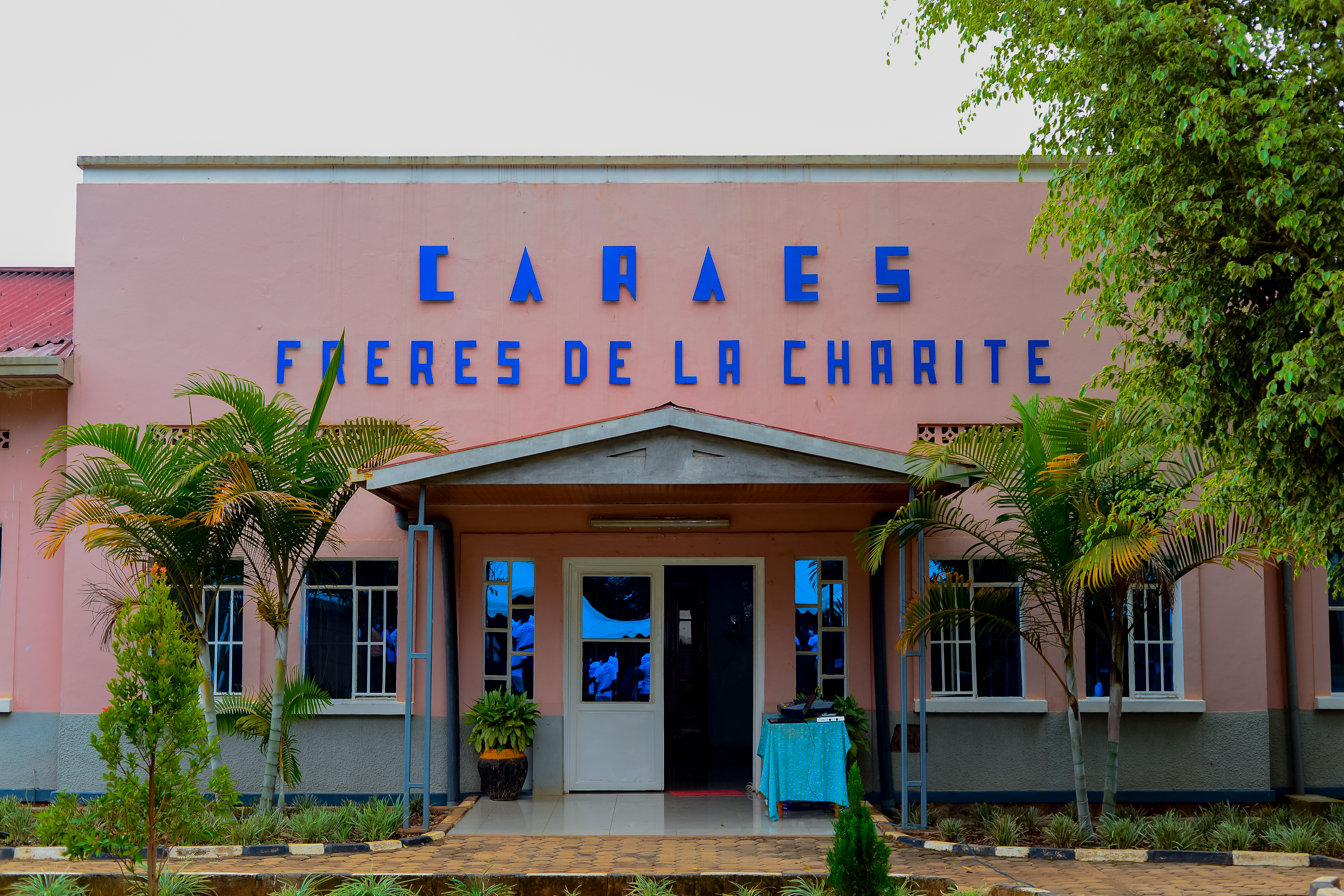

- Map of Rwanda showing the location of Ndera Neuropsychiatric Teaching Hospital

Geography
- Location: Kigali, Rwanda
- Coordinates: 01°57′17″S 30°10′08″E

Organisation
- Care system: Public
- Type: Tertiary, Referral, Teaching

Services
- Beds: 493

History
- Founded: 1968

Links
- Website: www.nderahospital.rw
- Other links: List of hospitals in Rwanda

Ndera Neuropsychiatric Teaching Hospital, widely known as Caraes Ndera Hospital, is a referral and teaching hospital in Rwanda that provides specialized healthcare in psychiatry and neurology. Founded in 1968, the hospital is located in Ndera Sector, Gasabo District in City of Kigali.

== Location ==
The main center is located in Nezerwa Village, Kibenga Cell, Ndera Sector, Gasabo District, Kigali City, 17 kilometers from Kigali City Centre. The geographical coordinates of Ndera Hospital are 1°57'17.2"S 30°10'08.2"E. (Latitude:-1.954778; Longitude: 30.168944).

== History ==
The hospital was founded in 1968 by the congregation of the Brothers of Charity at the request of the Rwandan Government and the Catholic Church. Before the introduction of Ndera Hospital, psychiatric patients were prisoned. When the first patients were admitted to the hospital in 1974, it had a capacity of 40 beds, but 3 years later, the beds were increased to 140. By October 2024, the bed capacity was at 493. In 1977, a special home for chronic psychiatric patients was built with a capacity of 12 beds. As the patients increased, Ndera Hospital established two branches; CARAES Butare in Huye District, Southern Province in 1976 and Icyizere Psychotherapeutic Centre, in Kicukiro District, City of Kigali in 2003. The hospital established CARAES Butare in 1978 to decentralize its services, and 25 years later, they opened a particular branch, Icyizere Psychotherapeutic Center, with bid to take care of people with addiction issues, and to particularly treat trauma, which was a big issue among the population just nine years after Genocide against the Tutsi.

== Overview ==
The hospital is owned by the Congregation of the Brothers of Charity in partnership with the Government Rwanda. The Rwandan Government supports the hospital by providing human resources and administrative support, while the Brothers of Charity oversee its daily management.

== Becoming a teaching hospital ==
On April 9, 2022, the Cabinet of Rwanda approved the Prime Minister's instructions determining organizational structure of Ndera Hospital, upgrading the facility to a University Teaching Hospital Level, also on the same day, nine other hospitals were upgraded to the Level Two Teaching Hospital, to increase workforce in the health sector. The new organizational structure was published in the Official Gazette of 11 August 2022.

== Statistics ==
In October 2024, the hospital announced that 101,811 patients were received in the year 2023–2024, which is 6.3% per cent increase compared to previous year. Number of cases related to depression was 4,626. The most prevalent pathology in psychiatry department at the hospital is schizophrenia, while the predominant pathology in neurology department is epilepsy.

== See also ==
- List of hospitals in Rwanda
