= List of hospitals in Rwanda =

This is a list of all hospitals in Rwanda.

== Kigali City ==
- University Teaching Hospital of Kigali (CHUK)
- Hopital la Croix du Sud (HCS)
- Kacyiru Police Hospital
- Frontier Diagnostic Center
- Muhima Hospital
- Kibagabaga Hospital
- Rwanda Military Referral and Teaching Hospital (also Rwanda Military Hospital)
- King Faisal Hospital Kigali
- Ndera Neuropsychiatric Teaching Hospital
- Masaka Hospital
- Nyarugenge Hospital
- WIWO Specialized Hospital
- BAHO International hospital.

== Eastern Province ==
- Rwinkwavu Hospital
- Kirehe Hospital
- Kibungo Hospital
- Nyagatare Hospital
- Gatunda Hospital
- Gahini Hospital
- Rilima Pediatric Orthopedic Hospital
- Nyamata Hospital
- Ngarama District Hospital
- Kiziguro Hospital
- Rwamagana Hospital

== Western Province ==
- Kirinda Hospital
- Kibuye Hospital
- Shyira Hospital
- Murunda Hospital
- Kabaya Hospital
- Gisenyi Hospital
- Mibilizi Hospital
- Kibogora Hospital
- Muhororo Hospital
- Gihundwe Hospital
- Bushenge Hospital
- Mugonero Hospital

== Northern Province ==
- Ruhengeri Hospital
- Rutongo Hospital
- Butaro Hospital
- Byumba Hospital
- Ruli Hospital
- Nemba Hospital
- Kinihira Hospital
- Gatonde Hospital

== Southern Province ==
- Kabgayi Hospital
- Kaduha Hospital
- Kibilizi Hospital
- Gitwe Hospital
- Nyabikenke Hospital
- Nyanza Hospital
- Munini Hospital
- Kigeme Hospital
- Gakoma Hospital
- Kabutare Hospital
- Remera-Rukoma Hospital
- University Teaching Hospital of Butare (CHUB)
- Ruhango Hospital
- HVP Gatagara Orthopedic and Rehabilitation Hospital

== See also ==
- Healthcare in Rwanda
