= International rankings of Rwanda =

The following are international rankings of Rwanda.

Organization	Survey	Ranking
Institute for Economics and Peace	Global Peace Index	92 out of 163
United Nations Development Programme	Human Development Index	159 out of 193
Transparency International	Corruption Perceptions Index	43 out of 180
The Heritage Foundation	Index of Economic Freedom	105 out of 177
World Intellectual Property Organization	Global Innovation Index, 2026	96 out of 139
