= Rwandan =

Rwandan or Rwandese may refer to:

- Related to, from, or connected to Rwanda, a country in Africa
- Banyarwanda, inhabitants of the country Rwanda and those of Rwandan ethnicity.
- Kinyarwanda, the language of the Banyarwanda, sometimes known as the Rwandan language.

== See also ==
- Rwandan cuisine
- Rwandan music
- Rwandan genocide
