= Senait Fisseha =

Ethiopian-American physician and lawyer

- ሰናይት ፍሰሃ
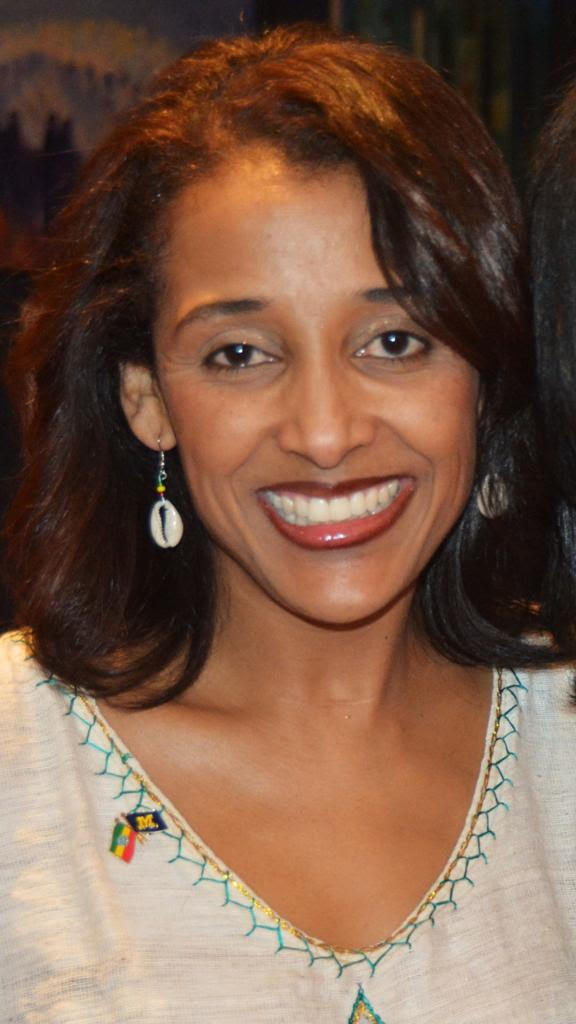
- Born: Addis Ababa, Ethiopia
- Board member of: Founder, Center for International Reproductive Health Training (CIRHT)

Academic background
- Education: Southern Illinois University

Academic work
- Discipline: Reproductive endocrinology and infertility

Senait Fisseha (Amharic: ሰናይት ፍሰሃ) is an Ethiopian-American physician, lawyer and obstetrician-gynecologist. She specialized in endocrinology at the University of Michigan and received her Juris Doctor from Southern Illinois University. She is currently Vice-President of International Programs at the Susan Thompson Buffet Foundation. She became an advocate for global equity, working with African leaders and institutions during the COVID-19 pandemic. She also chaired the election campaign and transition of Tedros Adhanom, the first African Director General of the World Health Organization, in 2016–17.

== Background and education ==
Fisseha was born in Addis Ababa, Ethiopia, where she briefly studied at Tikur Anbessa (Black Lion Medical School) before, relocating to the United States, Rosary College (now Dominican University), where she earned her Bachelor of Science degree. Senait later pursued a joint Juris Doctor (J.D.)/Doctor of Medicine (M.D.) program at Southern Illinois University where she graduated with honors and was inducted into the Alpha Omega Alpha honor society. She finalized her residency in obstetrics and gynecology and completed a fellowship in reproductive endocrinology and infertility at the University of Michigan medical center.

== Career ==
After the completion of her fellowship at the University of Michigan, she joined the institution as junior faculty and later earned a tenure track position, which resulted in a full professorship. During her tenure at the University of Michigan, Fisseha occupied numerous academic and administrative positions, including medical director of Michigan's Center for Reproductive Medicine, chief of division for reproductive endocrinology & infertility, and as the co-director of the medical school's Path of Excellence in Global Health & Disparities.

== Centre for International Reproductive Health Training ==
Fisseha established the Center for International Reproductive Health Training (CIRHT) at the University of Michigan in 2014 and she remained its executive director until 2015. CIRHT was founded to serve as a collaboration platform for University of Michigan faculty and faculty from medical institutions in sub-Saharan Africa and South East Asia where the reported maternal mortality rates are high. Fisseha's dedication has contributed to a period of reduced maternal mortality rates. Moreover, she has been instrumental in the establishment of an innovative and progressive family planning and reproductive health center, Michu, in Ethiopia.

== Global Health activities ==
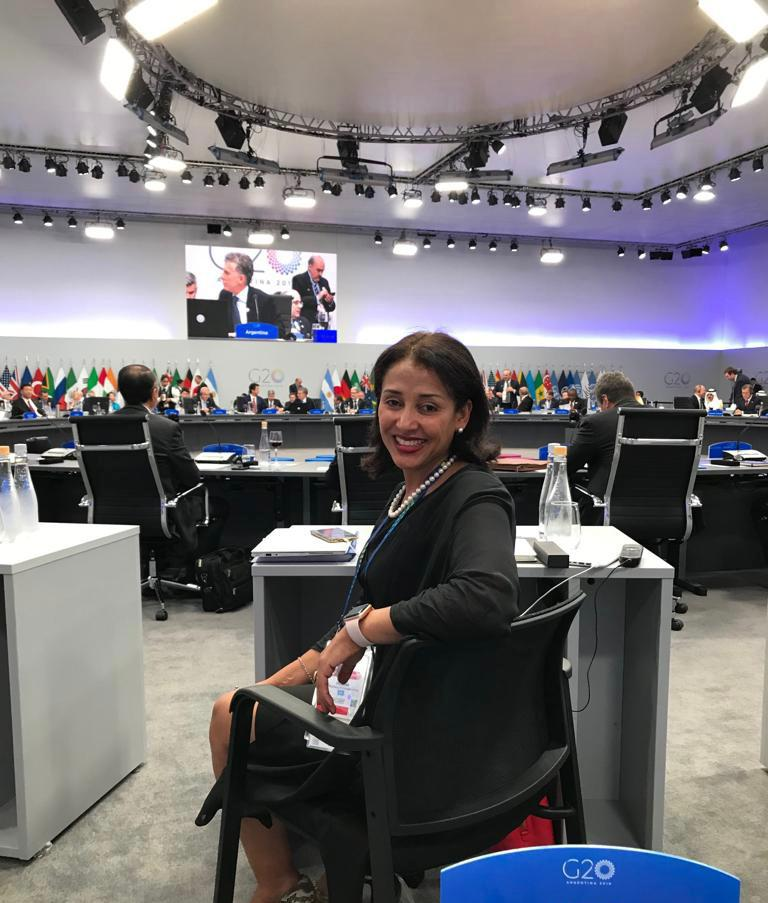
Senait Fisseha attending the G20 Leaders' Summit

In 2017, Fisseha chaired the successful campaign and transition of the director-general of the World Health Organization, Tedros Adhanom Ghebreyesus, the first African elected director-general of WHO. She later took up the role as his Chief Adviser. The election was unique in that all member states of the World Health Organization participated in the campaign to elect the Director-General for the first time. Her successful leadership was evident as he garnered 133 out of 185 votes.

Fisseha has been a member of various global health boards and committees, including the Lancet– SIGHT Commission on Peaceful Societies Through Health and Gender Equality, and the WHO's Council on the Economics of Health For All. In 2022, she joined the Commission for Universal Health convened by Chatham House. Over her career, Senait has been part of various associations and fellowships including the American Society of Reproductive Medicine (ASRM), European Society for Human Reproduction and Embryology (ESHRE), American College of Legal Medicine (ACLM), Norman F. Miller Gynecologic Society, American Congress of Obstetricians and Gynecologist and American Association of Ultrasound Medicine (AAUM). In addition, Senait holds the following positions: Exemplars in Global Health, Member of the Senior Advisory Board (since 2020); Global Health 50/50, Member of the Advisory Council (since 2018); Harvard Ministerial Leadership Program (of Harvard T.H. Chan School of Public Health, Harvard Kennedy School of Government, and the Graduate School of Education), Member of the Advisory Board (since 2018); University of Global Health Equity (UGHE), Member of the Board of Directors (since 2015); Ethio-American Doctors Group, Director; Global Initiative for Better Health, Member of the Advisory Board; Hamlin Fistula Foundation, Member of the Board of Directors; Willows Foundation for Reproductive Health (Istanbul, Turkey), Member of Board of Directors; WomenLift Health, Member of the Global Advisory Board and many more.

== COVID 19 related activities ==
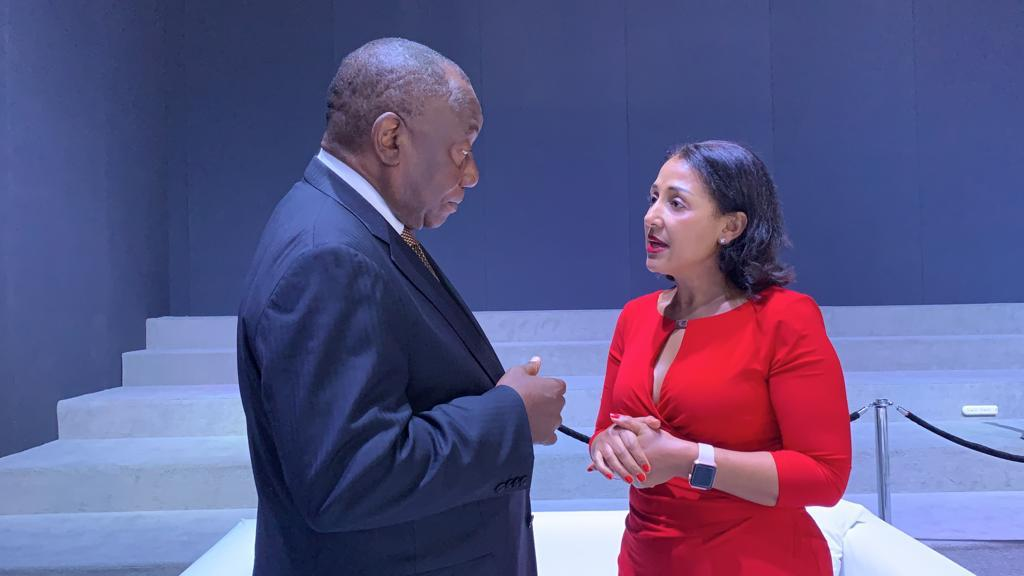
Senait Fisseha With President Cyril Ramaphosa

Throughout the COVID-19 pandemic, Fisseha emerged as a prominent advocate addressing global health disparities related to policy and vaccine distribution. She has worked closely with African leaders and the African Center for Diseases Control in promoting a new public health order that emphasizing global cooperation. Notably, she served as a Commissioner in the African Union COVID-19 Commission chaired by Cyril Ramaphosa of South Africa.

She was the founder and co-chair of the first International Conference on Public Health in Africa (CPHIA) which was held virtually in December 2021 during the COVID-19 pandemic. More than 12,000 people participated in the conference including several African Heads of Government to help accelerate progress in the response against COVID-19 by forging African expertise and resources. The Conference has been a major annual public health event of the continent since then and she continues to serve as one of the co-Chairs. In the aftermath of the COVID-19 Pandemic, Fisseha has also been an advocate for a new global public health order with capacity building in local manufacturing of medical products including vaccines and maternal health commodities for the Global South.

== Awards ==
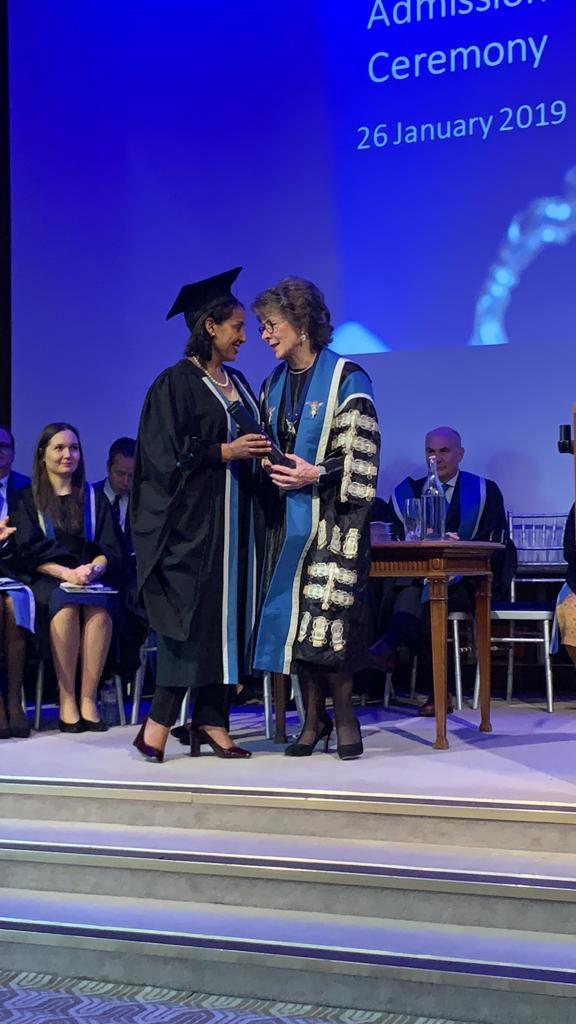
Senait receiving Fellowship honoris causa from the Royal College of Obstetricians and Gynecologists in 2019

In 2018, she was recognized as one of the 100 most influential Africans by the New Africa Magazine. She also received an Award of Merit from the African Leadership University, recognizing her foundational contributions to global healthcare. In 2013, the Ethiopian Ministry of Health bestowed upon her its highest honor for her significant impact on the healthcare sector. In 2016, she received the early distinguished career achievement award from the University of Michigan medical center alumni society and she was one of only 20 individuals to be honored with the University of Michigan Bicentennial Alumni Award for her global leadership in expanding reproductive health services in developing nations. Additionally, the Association of Women in Business (AWiB) in Ethiopia nominated her for their "Women of Excellence" award in 2016. In 2019, Fisseha was named one of the 100 Most Influential People in Gender Policy and was listed among the 'Top Forty Most Forward-Thinking Women' in 2020 by Athena40.

== Publications ==
Prof Senait published over 50 scientific publications on infertility, including the use of alternative medicine, the reproductive potential of cancer patients after chemotherapy, and postmenopausal reproduction.

== Personal life ==
Senait met her husband Tewodros Fesseha M.D., a Urology Robotic Surgeon, while she was conducting research at the University of Michigan. She is a mother of four children, three boys and a girl.
