= Mining in Rwanda =

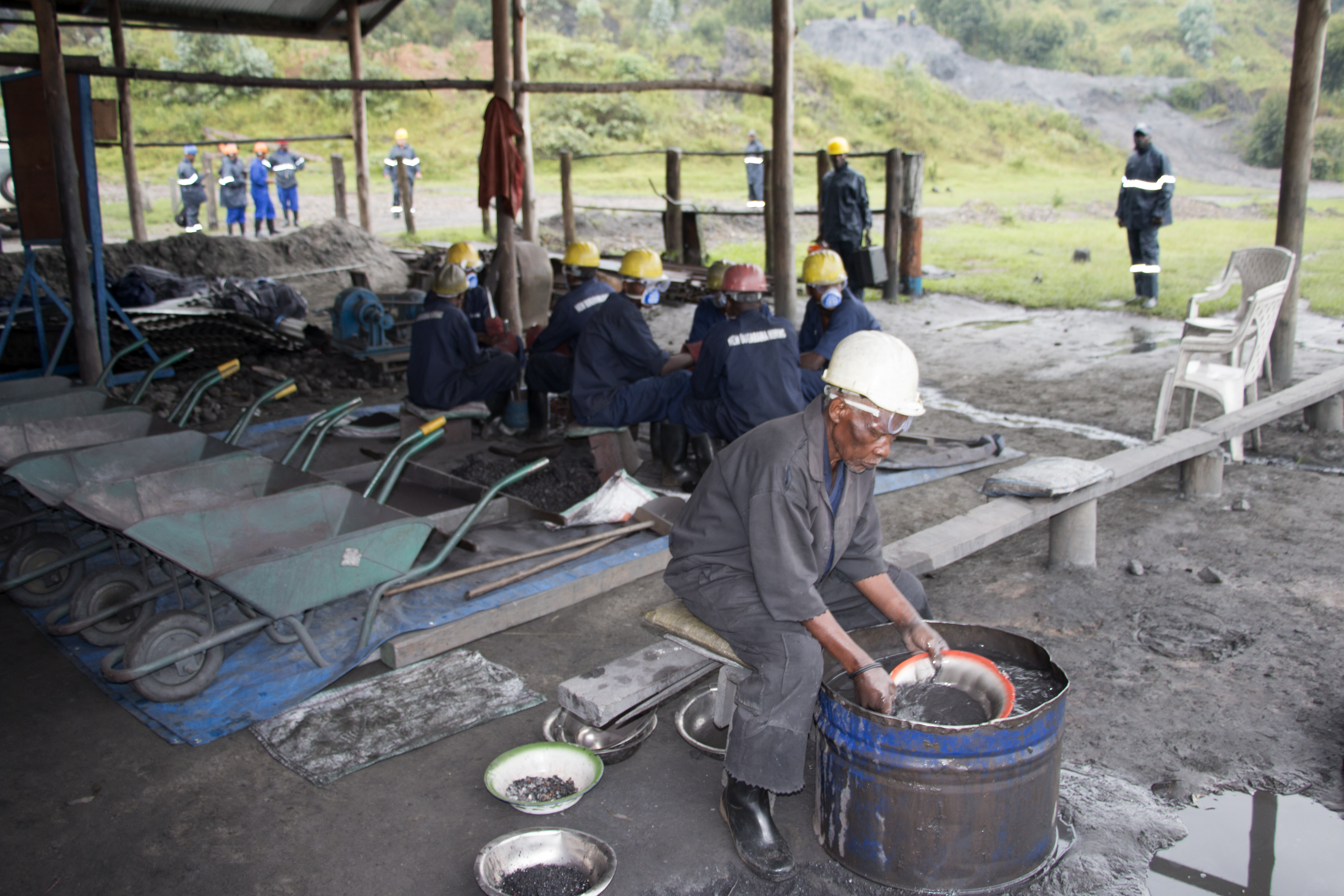
The New Bugurama Mining Company tungsten mine in Rwanda.

Mining in Rwanda consists of extracting such minerals as tin, tantalum, and tungsten. In 2020, Rwanda earned about US$733m from mineral exports, making mining the biggest source of export revenues after tourism.

In 2019, the country was the 7th largest world producer of tungsten and the 12th largest world producer of tin.

== Minerals extracted ==
- Cassiterite (tin ore) had the largest production and export volume at about 3,874 tons valued at US$42.2m in 2010 (down from 4,269 tons in 2009);

- It was followed by coltan with 749 tons in 2010 valued at $18.48m (949 tons in 2009), and wolfram (tungsten ore) with 843 tons in 2010 valued at $7.1m, down from 874 tons in 2009.

- Rwanda produces about 9% of the world’s tantalum, used in electronics manufacturing, and about 4% of global tungsten.

In October 2012, Rwanda's Ministry of Natural Resources suspended mining activities in the country's western province on the basis that they were endangering the River Sebeya. The decision was met with negativity due to the affected mining companies’ loss of production and the loss of thousands of jobs for workers at the mines.
