= Geology of Burundi =

The geology of Burundi consists largely of metamorphic rocks of Proterozoic age with inliers of basement rocks of Archaean age. The former are metasediments of the Burundian and Malagaarasian Supergroups which are of Meso- and Neoproterozoic age, respectively. Granites intrude the rocks from the Burundian Supergroup along a 350 km zone of mafic and ultramafic intrusions. Just like Tanzania, the Malagarasian Supergroup has Neoproterozoic rocks. The top of this group contains the Kibago Group, which consists of sandstones, quartzites, shales, and a basal conglomerate.

The Western Rift around and northwards of Bujumbura is partly filled by Cenozoic sediments.

== Tectonics ==
A fault system crosscuts the Kibaran Belt in the center of the country from North to South, and is known as the N-S accident. The fault system is either a late Kibaran suture or a late Kibaran lateral strike-slip deformation.

== Economic geology ==
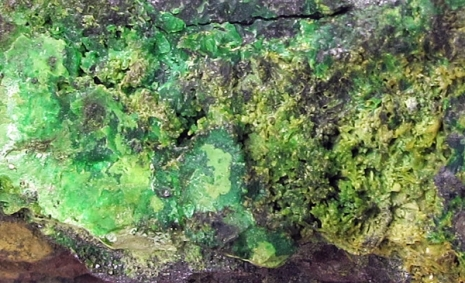
Trevorite and nepouite from the Musongati nickel-cobalt-copper lateritic deposit, which lies on top of a layered intrusion

Mining began in the 1920s though minerals are not a significant contributor to Burundi's economy, accounting for less than 1% of GDP. Among other minerals, mining in Burundi yields tungsten, tin, tantalum and niobium and possesses resources of nickel, uranium and rare earths. The mineral and petroleum industry is mostly stagnant due to poor infrastructure and transportation, as well as a civil war which ended in 2005. Many studies into mineral extraction feasibility have occurred, including gold lodes near Myinga and alluvial gold deposits in the northwest. Nickel laterite has been found near Musongati that could yield 30,000 mt/a of ore.
