= Law enforcement in Rwanda =

Rwanda's legal system is largely based on German and Belgian civil law systems and customary law.

- Rwanda National Police
- Rwanda Investigation Bureau

== Historical secret police organizations ==
- Service Central de Renseignements (SCR) (Central Information Service)

== See also ==
- Rwanda National Police

== References and sources ==
Sources

- World Police Encyclopedia, ed. by Dilip K. Das & Michael Palmiotto published by Taylor & Francis. 2004,
- World Encyclopedia of Police Forces and Correctional Systems, second edition, Gale., 2006
- Sullivan, Larry E. Encyclopedia of Law Enforcement. Thousand Oaks: Sage Publications, 2005.
