= HIV/AIDS in Rwanda =

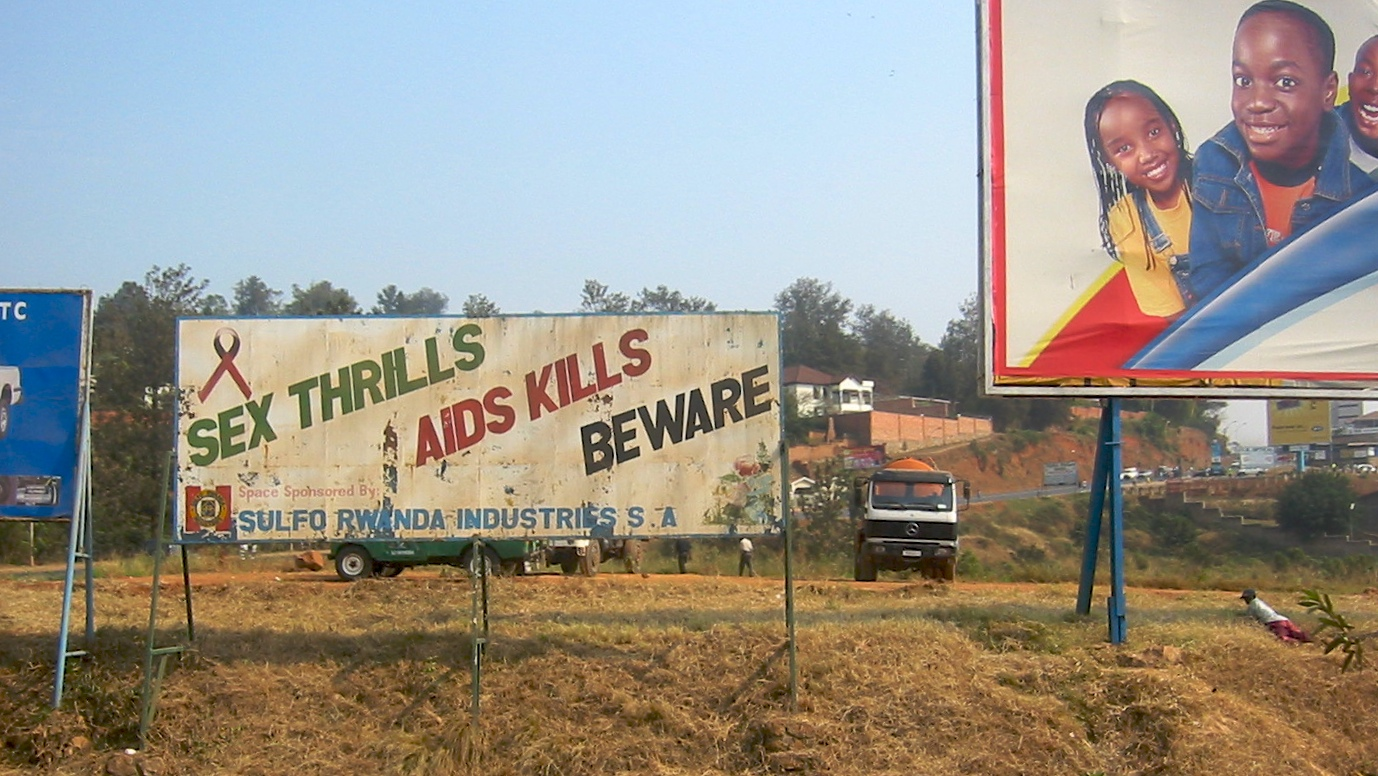
AIDS awareness sign in Rwanda

Rwanda faces a generalized epidemic, with an HIV prevalence rate of 3.1 percent among adults ages 15 to 49. The prevalence rate has remained relatively stable, with an overall decline since the late 1990s, partly due to improved HIV surveillance methodology. In general, HIV prevalence is higher in urban areas than in rural areas, and women are at higher risk of HIV infection than men. Young women ages 15 to 24 are twice as likely to be infected with HIV as young men in the same age group. Populations at higher risk of HIV infection include people in prostitution and men attending clinics for sexually transmitted infections.

Rwanda is among the world's least developed countries, ranking 160 of 189 in the United Nations Development Program's 2019 Human Development Index. Some 60 percent of the population lives in poverty. During the three months of genocide in 1994, mass rape, sexual torture and psychological trauma were common. Massive population flows following the Rwandan genocide of 1994 have resulted in an increase in the urban population. The shortage of human resources throughout the health sector is a significant constraint. Of Rwandans killed or displaced during the genocide, a disproportionate number were highly skilled and educated members of society, including doctors, nurses and other health workers. Many health centers lack essential physical facilities, equipment and supplies. Electricity supply is erratic throughout Rwanda, affecting hospitals, health centers and laboratories. Blood safety, data management and drug storage are all impacted by the erratic electricity supply. While stigma continues to be a problem for people living with HIV/AIDS, the situation is slowly improving due to good information sharing at all levels about HIV/AIDS. The President Paul Kagame has made many efforts in improving the situation, through different awareness raising initiatives.

== Overview ==
=== History and emergence in Africa ===
Acquired immune deficiency syndrome (AIDS) is a disease comprising associated conditions caused by a human immunodeficiency virus (HIV) infection. Despite myriad research studies, unresolved questions about origins and epidemic emergence of HIV/AIDS remain. At the beginning of the global AIDS epidemic in the early 1980s, HIV/AIDS was considered a disease exclusive to homosexual men and intravenous drug users, but in Africa, new HIV/AIDS cases were observed across numerous subpopulations. Proposed reasons for the emergence of HIV in Africa in the 20th century include, but are not limited to, rapid population growth, change in population structure, and clinical interventions that provided the opportunity for rapid human-to-human transmission.

=== Emergence and prevalence of HIV in Rwanda ===
The prevalence of HIV/AIDS is a major public health concern in Rwanda as HIV/AIDS-related mortality has substantial negative social and economic consequences for residents and the government. The first case of HIV infection in Rwanda was reported in 1983. The estimated incidence rate for HIV in Rwanda is 0.11%; this is a stable rate.

According to the 2014–2015 Rwanda Demographic and Health Survey (RDHS), "In Rwanda, much of the information on national HIV prevalence is derived from the antenatal care (ANC) sentinel surveillance system. Although surveillance data do not provide estimates of HIV prevalence for the general population, they do provide results specific to women attending antenatal clinics. The inclusion of HIV testing in the 2005, 2010, and 2014–15 RDHS surveys offer[ed] the opportunity to better understand the magnitude and patterns of infection in the general population of reproductive age, including men age 15–59 who are not tested as part of antenatal sentinel surveillance. The 2014–15 RDHS is the third RDHS survey to anonymously link HIV testing results with key behavioral and sociodemographic characteristics of both male and female respondents, the first being the 2005 RDHS. These surveys provide national, population-based trend data on HIV prevalence among women age 15–49 and men age 15–59. In addition, for the first time, the 2014–15 RDHS included HIV testing of children age 0–14."

In Rwanda, HIV prevalence has been stable since 2005 and remains at 3% among adults age 15–49 (4% among women and 2% among men). The prevalence of HIV is higher in urban areas (6%) than rural areas (2%); HIV prevalence is 6% in the capital city of Kigali and 2–3% in each of the other provinces.

The HIV prevalence increases with age. Less than 1% of children (ages 0–14) are living with HIV. Across age groups, the highest HIV prevalence is observed among women age 40–44 (8%) and men age 45–49 (9%).

Regardless of sex, HIV prevalence is closely related to marital status. Fifteen percent of widows and 8% of those divorced or separated reported being HIV positive, as compared with only 3% of those who were married at the time of the survey.

By wealth, HIV prevalence is highest among both young women and young men in the highest wealth quintile. However, the relationship between HIV prevalence and household wealth quintile is not linear.

Among youth in Rwanda, HIV prevalence by educational attainment. Five percent of young women with no education are HIV-positive whereas 2% of young women with a primary education and 1% with a secondary education or higher are HIV-positive. Among young men, HIV prevalence is higher among those with any education than among those with none.

== National policy and programmatic responses to the HIV/AIDS epidemic ==
=== History of Rwanda's HIV/AIDS response ===
==== Early responses ====
Rwanda's HIV/AIDS surveillance efforts began in 1984 with the establishment of a national AIDS case reporting system in hospitals and health centers. The country's early response to its HIV/AIDS epidemic was relatively rapid and sustained. In 1985, the Rwandan Ministry of Health and the Red Cross established one of the first and most effective blood donor screening programs in Africa. In 1986, Rwanda was the first country in the world to conduct and report on a nationally representative HIV/AIDS seroprevalence survey. In 1987, the National AIDS Program was established in collaboration with the World Health Organization (WHO).

==== The 1990–1994 civil war and genocide ====
Rwanda's civil war began in 1990. Between April and July 1994, genocide claimed the lives of an estimated 800,000 Rwandese, displaced nearly four million people, and had a devastating impact on national health infrastructure. In addition to severe limitations being placed on the ability of the Rwandan government to prevent and treat HIV/AIDS during the genocide, the International Criminal Tribunal for Rwanda noted the use of 'genocidal rape' as a weapon of war during this time, with between 250,000 and 500,000 women and girls being subjected to rape. Deliberate infection with HIV was observed as a pattern of warfare. The exact effect of these actions on HIV/AIDS prevalence is, however, not known.

==== Rebuilding after the civil War ====
After the civil war and the genocide, Rwanda's health system had been devastated, with life expectancy at just 30 years and one out of four children dying before their fifth birthday. Between 1990 and 2002, the country recorded steadily increasing numbers of new AIDS cases with between 1,000 and 4,000 new case reports per year. This was followed more recently by dramatic increases in cases in 2003 and 2004 (over 6,000 and 12,000 cases reported, respectively). Overall, HIV prevalence is thought to have stabilized since its peak in the early 1990s, partly also due to the effects of the genocide.

Rwanda adopted a community-based healthcare model (called Mutuelles de Santé, the insurance requires community members to pay a premium based on their income and a 10% upfront charge for each visit) to counter shortages in skilled professionals and prioritized national ownership of healthcare as a central aspect of its health reconstruction efforts after the war.

Vision 2020, the national development plan which aims to make Rwanda a lower-middle income-country by 2020, includes health as a central aspect of development and guides the national allocation of resources. Rwanda favors a multi-sectoral approach to health care, and, while funding for the health system is heavily dependent on donor aid, State ownership and control over policy is strong.

==== HIV/AIDS policies and programs in the past ====
There has been growing availability of HIV testing, care, and treatment services in Rwanda since 2000. Anti-retroviral therapy (ART) was first introduced in 1999. The 2005–2009 Health Sector Strategic Plan names as one of its goals the curbing and reversal of the spread of HIV infection by 2015. It also includes as goals increasing demand for HIV prophylaxis and treatment through the development of public education campaigns and 'gender-specific' implementation. In 2006, it was reported that voluntary testing and counseling was available at 226 sites. Large-scale Prevention of Mother to Child Transmission (PMTCT) and health promotion initiatives were also reported in at least 208 sites.

In 2009, Rwanda published its first National Strategic Plan on HIV and AIDS, outlining the overarching goals for the country's multi-sector response. "It is based on the most up-to-date understanding of the epidemic and the strengths and weaknesses of the systems and mechanisms that are used to respond." The Plan calls for "universal access to HIV and AIDS services". In addition, it counts the reduction of infections, reduced morbidity and mortality and equal opportunities for persons living with HIV/AIDS as goals. The plan also targeted behavior change and risk reduction as important outcomes. In 2012, it was estimated that 80% of people in need of ART were able to access it through the community-based healthcare system. The National Strategic Plan (2009–2012) was succeeded by the Second National Strategic Plan on HIV and AIDS (2013–2018).

=== Current legal and policy framework ===
HIV/AIDS is prioritized in several policy instruments, including Vision 2020 and the Economic Development and Poverty Reduction Strategy 2013–2018 (EDPRS II), which includes a framework for multi-sectoral responses to HIV/AIDS. Each sector within EDPRS II has specific HIV mainstreaming strategies and targets, including education, health, labor, military, transport, gender, young people, agriculture, finance and social welfare. The third Health Sector Strategic Plan (HSSP-III) is a framework document for the development and shaping of health policy in Rwanda. Among its goals are the reduction of HIV infections, reduction of HIV-related morbidity and mortality, strengthened management of HIV/AIDS and equal opportunities for people living with HIV.

==== Second National Strategic Plan on HIV and AIDS (National Strategic Plan 2013–2018) ====
The National Strategic Plan is a reference document for all sectors, institutions and partners involved in the fight against HIV and AIDS. The National Strategic Plan goals include:

- Lowering the new infection rate by two thirds from an estimated 6,000 per year currently to 2,000;
- Halving the number of HIV-related deaths from 5,000 to 2,500 per year; and
- Ensuring that people living with HIV have the same opportunities as all others.

The National Strategic Plan addresses issues of key populations and vulnerable groups. These include men who have sex with men, sex workers, mobile populations, persons in uniform, young people, women and girls and people with disabilities. Key settings such as prisons, schools and workplaces are also taken into account. Cross cutting issues related to human rights protection, stigma and discrimination, gender inequality, poverty and involvement of people living with HIV also feature in the National Strategic Plan. The National Strategic Plan outlines strategies such as creating public awareness of stigma and discrimination and addressing the legal barriers that prevent key populations from accessing and utilizing services. Due to the lack of a mid-term progress report, it is unclear if this objective has been met.

Prevention of sexual transmission of HIV and sexually transmitted infections, prevention of mother to child transmission of HIV, counselling and testing and prevention of HIV in health care settings are stated priorities of the National Strategic Plan. In addition, the key drivers of HIV in Rwanda have been identified through the Mode of Transmission model. The strategies for prevention have since been revised and updated to be more consistent with new developments and technology. For example, male circumcision using Prepex is currently being rolled out in the Rwanda. According to the National Strategic Plan, priority interventions relating to HIV treatment include increasing access and enrolment on ART, providing treatment for TB/HIV co-infection and community and home-based palliative care. There has been a lot of progress in the area of treatment including more people being able to access ART, the adoption of the test and treat strategy for discordant couples, sex workers, and the adoption of the new WHO treatment guidelines and the availability of treatment for prisoners. However, challenges still remain with regard to pre-ART care, treatment for opportunistic infections and improving adherence.

With regard to orphans and vulnerable children (OVC), the development of OVC standards of care has recently taken place. The National Strategic Plan focuses on strategic needs of OVC such as protecting their human rights and ensuring access to adequate food, shelter, education and health services, and protection from abuse. Major challenges include the continuous increase in OVC, poor data collection and lack of a national OVC database.

The National Strategic Plan includes indicators and targets, making it possible to track progress and follow up on commitments made. It will be evaluated both at midterm and at the end of the cycle. Thus far, there have not been any mid-term reports published.

==== Other relevant legislation and policy ====
The Constitution of Rwanda and the regulation regarding labor in Rwanda (N° 13/2009 of 27/05/2009) prohibits discrimination within certain contexts. These are general laws with no specific reference to HIV and AIDS. With regard to the laws to reduce violence against women, the Law on Prevention and Punishment of Gender-Based Violence was enacted in 2008. It outlaws gender-based violence which is defined broadly to include physical, sexual, economic and psychological violence. Read with the Penal Code, the Act criminalizes willful HIV transmission. This is due to the fact that the Act defines sexual abuse to include "the engagement of another person in sexual contact, whether married or not, which includes sexual conduct that abuses, humiliates or degrades the other person or otherwise violates another person's sexual integrity, or sexual contact by a person aware of being infected with HIV or any other sexually transmitted infection with another person without that other person being given prior information of the infection."

== HIV interventions and achievements ==
=== Prevention ===
Rwanda uses a number of HIV/AIDs prevention strategies. These include social and educational programs, condom distribution, volunteer medical male circumcision, and prevention of mother to child transmission.

==== Testing and counseling programs ====
HIV testing and counseling (HTC) services are provided free of charge in all public health facilities and accredited private clinics in Rwanda. Outreach HCT campaigns are regularly carried out to deliver services to areas with less access to the health system. These campaigns are conducted in partnership with community-based organizations, the private sector, non-governmental organizations (NGOs) and faith-based organizations.

In 2013, Rwanda introduced testing using "finger prick" blood collection in all health facilities. The number of health facilities offering voluntary counseling and testing has increased from 15 in 2001 to 493 in 2013.

Special attention is given to the prevention of HIV among vulnerable groups. Of these vulnerable groups, female sex workers were identified as key in preventing the further spread of HIV. In 2010, the prevalence of HIV among sex workers was 51%. To address female sex workers, national guidelines for HIV prevention in this vulnerable population were developed and disseminated as a part of the HIV National Strategic Plan 2013–2018. ROADS II, a USAID project, has been key in facilitating trainings, mentorships and peer groups to improve knowledge of HIV and prevention strategies, and condom distribution through peer education.

==== Condom distribution ====
Rwanda has made gains in the distribution of condoms through social marketing and rapid sales outlets. The private sector has also been active in the uptake of condom use. From 2009 to 2013, 5 million more condoms have been distributed.

==== Circumcision ====
In 2014, the prevalence of male circumcision was 30% between the ages of 15-49. Voluntary medical male circumcision was added to the 2013–2018 National Strategic Plan of HIV. Surgical kit for voluntary medical male circumcision were provided to all facilities and two healthcare workers were trained per facility. These services are now regularly provided.

==== Prevention of mother to child transmission (PMTCT) ====
PMTCT services have been scaled up throughout the country with 97% of all facilities provide PMCTC services by 2013. The national elimination of mother to child transmission strategy of 2011–2015 integrated PMTCT services into the regular healthcare system. Community health workers are also active in seeking out women who have missed follow-up appointments.

Services for PMTCT provided during antenatal care visits include pre and post-test HIV counseling, blood draws for CD4, an appointment for CD4 results, partner testing, hemoglobin testing, WHO HIV clinical classification and enrolment in care, the initiation of ART, counseling on infant feeding and counseling on family planning.

Option B+, an alternative PMTCT method, starts pregnant women on ARTs and continues treatment through pregnancy and life regardless of CD4 count. This treatment has been initiated in Rwanda and is being scaled to every health facility.

=== Care, treatment, and support ===
Rwanda has been updated its management and protocols in accordance with 2013 WHO recommendations. New efforts include treatment as prevention for female sex workers and men who have sex with men and test and treat protocols for tuberculosis-HIV co-infection, hepatitis B virus-HIV co-infection, and hepatitis C virus-HIV co-infection.

Over the course of the last ten years, treatment of HIV patients with ARTs has been considerably scaled up. In 2002, only four facilities delivered ARTs compared to 465 in 2013. Now 91% of cases receive care and treatment.

== Current challenges in the HIV/AIDS response ==
=== External donor funding ===
Continued, rapid decline in donor funding from external resources may affect targets set by the government "to reduce by 75% new HIV infections, reduce by 50% AIDS related deaths, and reach zero stigma and discriminations for people infected and affected by HIV, the government of Rwanda is putting in all efforts to takeover, however the reduction trend from external resources".[xxxvi]

=== Stigma ===
Widespread stigma and discrimination toward those living with HIV and AIDS can adversely impact willingness to be tested for HIV and compliance with ART.

=== Targeting subpopulations ===
Key populations – female workers, youth, and men with higher educational attainment – play an important role in the dynamic of HIV in Rwanda.

== Financing for the national HIV response ==
Health expenditures on HIV are tracked through the Health Resource Tracking tool. All health sector actors, including Government institutions and Development Partners, are required to report annually their HIV expenditures for the previous fiscal year, as well as their budgets for the current fiscal year. Rwanda's Global AIDS Response Progress Report 2014 provides recent national HIV financing information for fiscal year 2011–2012 and fiscal year 2012–2013.

=== Key development partners ===
Rwanda's key HIV development and funding partners include the Global Fund to Fight AIDS, Tuberculous and Malaria and PEPFAR. Additional development partners (including international foundations and NGOs, bilateral agencies, and the United Nations (UN)) provide financial and technical support and aid in Rwanda's process of HIV policy and program development.

Development partners work with the Rwandan Government to set and achieve targets outlined in the National Strategic Plan 2013–2018. Development partners conduct joint planning and coordination with the Government and submit annual reports and budgets to ensure the Government can monitor and maximize development partners' resources. Rwanda has a common monitoring and evaluation system managed by Rwanda Biomedical Center-HIV Division where development partners can utilize reporting tools. National and international partners are encouraged to work together to maximize time spent supporting beneficiaries and minimize the reporting burden.

=== Rwanda fiscal year 2011–2012 ===
Public and external funding sources for HIV/AIDS in Rwanda in fiscal year 2011–2012 totaled USD 234.6 million. Of the total funding, USD 17.7 million (7.6% of total HIV/AIDS spending) came from public funding, and USD 216.8 million (92.4% of total HIV/AIDS spending) came from external funding. This total funding excludes out-of-pocket and private sector contribution.

Among external HIV/AIDS funding sources in Rwanda, the Global Fund made up 48.8% of HIV/AIDS funding, followed by the U.S. government (39.3%), international NGOs (2.8%), and UN agencies (1.8%). Additional bilateral organizations played a smaller role, with the Government of Luxembourg and Swiss Development Cooperation combined contributing 0.2% of total HIV/AIDS funding. The only other multilateral agency contributing to the total funding included the World Bank, representing 0.01% of total HIV/AIDS funding.

=== Rwanda fiscal year 2012–2013 ===
Public and external funding sources for HIV/AIDS in Rwanda in fiscal year 2012–2013 totaled USD 243.6 million, a four percent increase from the previous fiscal year spending. Of the total funding, USD 20.0 million (8.2% of total HIV/AIDS spending) came from public funding, and USD 223.6 million (91.8% of total HIV/AIDS spending) came from external funding. This total funding excludes out-of-pocket and private sector contribution.

Among external HIV/AIDS funding sources in Rwanda, Global Fund for AIDS, Tuberculous and Malaria made up 54.7% of HIV/AIDS funding, followed by the U.S. government (34.6%), international NGOs (1.0%), and UN Agencies (1.0%). Additional bilateral organizations contributed less than 0.5% of total HIV/AIDS funding.

== See also ==
- AIDS pandemic
- HIV/AIDS in Africa
