= List of ecoregions in Rwanda =

The following is a list of ecoregions in Rwanda, according to the Worldwide Fund for Nature (WWF).

== Terrestrial ecoregions ==
By major habitat type:

=== Tropical and subtropical moist broadleaf forests ===
- Albertine Rift montane forests

=== Tropical and subtropical grasslands, savannas, and shrublands ===
- Victoria Basin forest–savanna mosaic

=== Montane grasslands and shrublands ===
- Ruwenzori-Virunga montane moorlands

== Freshwater ecoregions ==
By bioregion:

=== Great Lakes ===
- Lake Victoria Basin

== See also ==
- Wildlife of Rwanda
