= Masaka Hospital, Rwanda =

Rwandan hospital

Masaka Hospital
- Rwanda Ministry of Health
- Map of Rwanda showing the location of Masaka Hospital.

Geography
- Location: Masaka, Kigali, Kicukiro District, Rwanda
- Coordinates: 01°59′30″S 30°12′43″E

Organisation
- Care system: Public
- Type: General

Services
- Emergency department: I
- Beds: 837 (2026)

History
- Founded: 2011

Links
- Other links: Hospitals in Rwanda

Masaka Hospital, Rwanda, commonly known as Masaka Hospital, is a hospital in Rwanda. It is an urban, general hospital built between 2008 and 2011, with funding from the Government of China, as a gift to the Government of Rwanda.

== Location ==
The hospital is located in the Masaka neighborhood, in the capital city of Kigali, the capital of Rwanda and the largest city in that country. This location lies approximately 17 kilometres (11 mi), by road, east of the central business district of Kigali. The geographical coordinates of Masaka Hospital are 01°59'30.0"S, 30°12'43.0"E (Latitude:-1.991667; Longitude:30.211944).

== Overview ==
The Chinese government designed and built the hospital as a gift to the people of Rwanda. The institution which was completed in 2011, offers services in general medicine, emergency medicine, traditional Chinese medicine, dentistry, orthopedic surgery, and psychiatry. As of July 2018, the hospital is operated by a team of six Chinese doctors assisted by a smaller number of Rwandan medical doctors and dentists. At that time, three medical doctors were in China, pursuing master's degrees and one dentist had graduated with a Master of Dental Surgery and had returned to the hospital "to serve the community".

Other disciplines offered at this hospital include maternity services, internal medicine, pediatrics, imaging services, general surgery, tuberculosis treatment, nutrition services, general anesthesia, HIV/AIDS treatment, and outpatient services.

== Target population ==
The hospital is intended to serve, primarily the residents of (a) Kicukiro District (b) Gasabo District and (c) Rwamagana District. The target population numbers between 380,000 and 400,000 people. The hospital is administered directly by the Rwanda Ministry of Health.

== Expansion ==
In August 2026, following renovations and expansion, the expanded hospital was handed back to the government of Rwanda. The floor area was increased from 6,398 square metres (68,867 sq ft) to 56,957 square metres (613,080 sq ft). The bed capacity was increased from 127 to 837. Outpatient daily capacity was expanded to 2,000 out-patient visits. The expanded hospital is expected to serve as the teaching hospital for the University of Rwanda School of Medicine.

== See also ==
- List of hospitals in Rwanda
