= Butaro Hospital =

Coordinates: 01°24′35″S 29°50′24″E

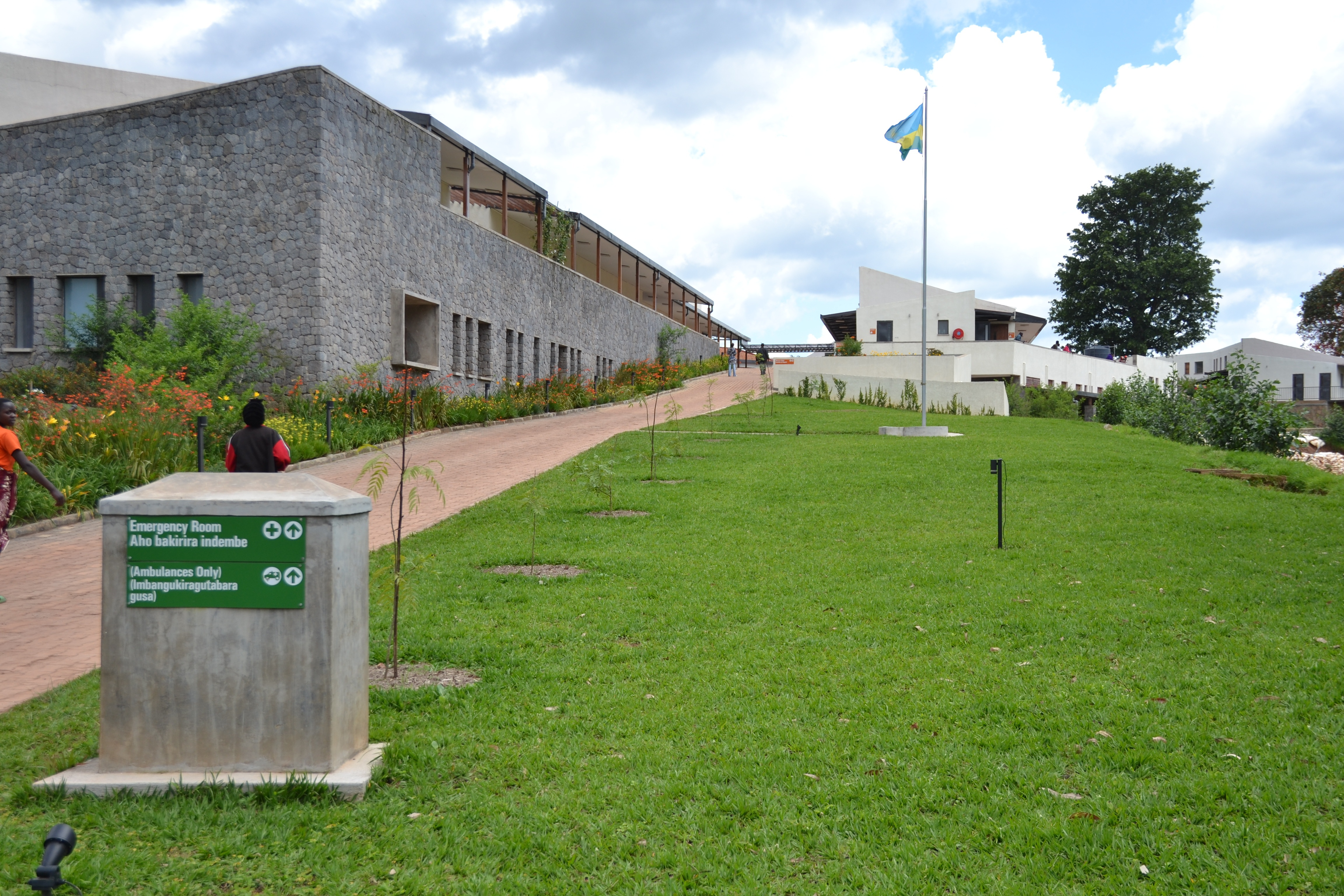
- Butaro Hospital, October 2011

Geography
- Location: Butaro Sector, Burera District, Northern Province, Rwanda

Services
- Emergency department: Yes
- Beds: 150

History
- Founded: 24 January 2011

Links
- Lists: Hospitals in Rwanda

BUTARO HOSPITAL

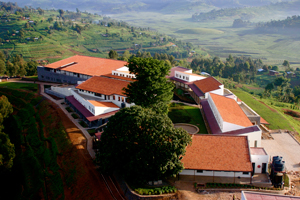
Aerial view of Butaro Hospital

The Butaro Hospital (Kinyarwanda: Ibitaro bya Butaro) is a hospital in Burera District, in the Northern Province of Rwanda. The hospital serves as the district hospital for Burera District and surrounding communities.

== Location ==
Butaro District Hospital is located in the Butaro Sector, of Burera District, in Rwanda's Northern Province, approximately 96 kilometres (60 mi), by road, north of Kigali, the national capital of Rwanda, and its largest city. The geographical coordinates of the hospital are 01°24'35.0"S, 29°50'24.0"E (Latitude:-1.409722; Longitude:29.840000).

== Overview ==
Butaro Hospital maintains 256 in-patient beds. The facility features an innovative design intended to harmonize with the local environment and reduce the risk of hospital-acquired infections. Hospital departments include emergency room, intensive care units, pediatric ward, surgical theaters and an IT room. The hospital is equipped with Wireless Internet throughout the hospital campus, with laptop computers present at every nursing station. Telemedicine facilities are available for consultation with Harvard Medical School and Brigham and Women’s Hospital.

== History ==
The Butaro Hospital was designed by MASS in cooperation with the Rwandan Ministry of Health and Partners in Health. The construction of the 150-bed hospital begun in December 2008 and it was opened on 24 January 2011. The hospital was originally a health center, prior to 2008. Commissioning of the completed hospital was performed by Paul Kagame, the President of Rwanda.

Construction was completed one year earlier than scheduled. Over 3,500 local community members were employed during construction. Wherever possible, the hospital was built using local materials, including volcanic stone from the Virunga Mountains.

== Butaro Cancer Center of Excellence ==
In July 2012, Butaro Cancer Center of Excellence opened its doors to the public, offering the first cancer ward in rural East Africa. It was developed by Partners In Health, with support from Dana-Farber Cancer Institute and the Rwandan government. The Jeff Gordon Children’s Foundation contributed $1.5 million to its creation.

=== Butaro Ambulatory Cancer Center ===
In 2013, an outpatient facility was added to treat cancer patients who need regular IV chemotherapy, but who do not require hospitalization. Services include pathology-based diagnosis, chemotherapy, and surgery, referral for radiotherapy, socio-economic support, and long-term follow up.

Butaro Ambulatory Cancer Center was designed by MASS Design Group, built by Partners In Health, and funded by the Cummings Foundation, Inc. of Woburn, Massachusetts. Other partners include the government of Rwanda, Rwanda Biomedical Center, and Dana-Farber/Brigham and Women's Hospital Cancer Center in Boston.
