= King Faisal Hospital (Kigali) =

- Rwanda Ministry of Health
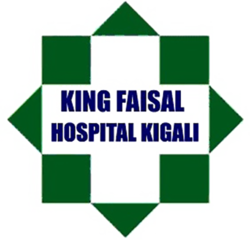

- Map of Rwanda showing the location of King Faisal Hospital Kigali.

Geography
- Location: Kigali, Rwanda
- Coordinates: 01°56′37″S 30°05′42″E

Organisation
- Care system: Public
- Type: Tertiary, Referral

Services
- Emergency department: I
- Beds: 160

History
- Founded: 1994

Links
- Website: www.kfh.rw
- Other links: List of hospitals in Rwanda

King Faisal Hospital is a hospital in the Kacyiru area of the Rwandan capital, Kigali. It was established between 1987 and 1991 with the help of the Saudi Fund for Development (SFD). Being the largest referral hospital in Rwanda, King Faisal Hospital, Kigali, spreads over 7.9 hectares. It is located in an upscale area and has 18,000 square meters of floor space distributed over 4 floors and an extension building of 2,285 square meters of floor space. The hospital provides a range of highly specialized medical care, including the diagnosis of diseases and specialized treatment.

== Facilities ==
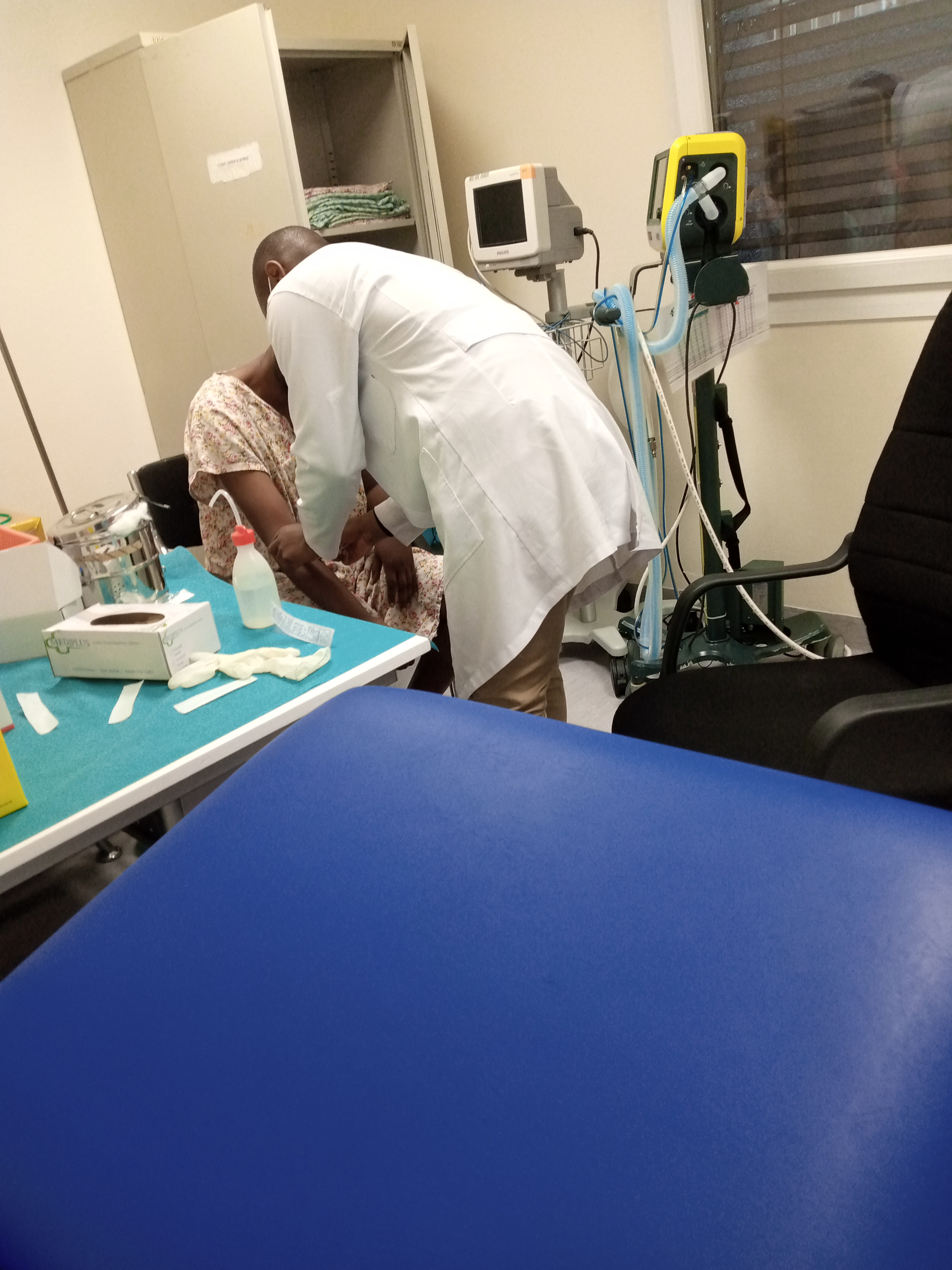
King Faisal Hospital

King Faisal Hospital in Kigali has 160 beds. That includes 7 Intensive Care Unit (ICU) beds, 7 high-dependency unit beds, 5 operation theaters, 7 Neonatal Intensive Care Unit (NICU) beds, 13 beds in the emergency observation rooms, and 2 fully equipped resuscitation rooms. The hospital also has a private wing with eight high-end rooms, two of which are ICU rooms. With an average annual number of consultations of 72,201 patients and an average annual number of admissions of 8,346, the hospital has the region's lowest average length of stay of 5 days.

King Faisal Hospital Kigali acquired a cath lab (catheterization lab) in November 2020. The laboratory will be in use for several procedures, including diagnosing and treating certain cardiovascular conditions; Carrying out coronary angioplasty (opening narrowed or blocked blood vessels that supply blood to the heart); coronary stenting (placing tube-shaped devices into the coronary arteries that supply blood to the heart to keep them open); as well as other interventions to correct blood flow, repair holes in the heart, or locate blockages in blood vessels.

In December 2020, the hospital acquired a 1.5 Tesla MRI digital scanner. The MRI is the latest technology. It provides higher-resolution scans of the body's organs and tissues and allows for better diagnosis. The hospital has the only CT scanner with a 128-slice capacity in the country, as well as 13 hemodialysis machines.

As of September 2020, the hospital had started a renovation and expansion project. The newly launched outpatient block comprises 45 new consultation rooms and an outpatient clinic that will offer premium services. The first phase of the renovation project, focused on revamping the hospital's lobby and private inpatient wing, has been completed.

In the second quarter of 2021, our Obstetrics and Gynecology unit acquired a high-resolution ultrasound machine that will markedly improve the diagnostic accuracy for fetal anomalies in the first and second trimesters of pregnancy. The new ultrasound machine delivers 3D and 4D imaging formats, allowing King Faisal Hospital to stay at the forefront of women's health imaging, from routine women's health exams to complex imaging, including fetal echocardiography.

== Name Origin ==
The hospital was named after King Faisal bin Abdulaziz Al Saud (April 1906–March 1975), who was a Saudi Arabian statesman, diplomat, and King of Saudi Arabia from November 2, 1964, until his assassination in 1975. Prior to his ascension, he served as Crown Prince of Saudi Arabia from November 9, 1953, to November 2, 1964, and he was briefly regent to his half-brother King Saud in 1964. He was the third son of King Abdulaziz, the founder of modern Saudi Arabia, and the second of Abdulaziz's six sons who were kings.

== Specialties ==
The hospital has invested in key medical specialties, including cardiology, cardio-thoracic surgery, neurosurgery, digestive surgery, and orthopedics. Other specialties include nephrology, emergency medicine, pediatrics, oncology, gynecology, and obstetrics; ENT; urology; pulmonology; dental and maxillofacial services; ophthalmology; dermatology; haematology; and pathology services.

With the arrival in January 2021 of a specialized adult nephrologist and one of the pioneers of kidney transplant in Sub-Saharan Africa, the hospital foresees starting a kidney transplant center in the last quarter of 2021, which will be the very first in Rwanda.

== Accreditation ==
King Faisal Hospital, Kigali, is accredited by COHSASA. COHSASA is an accrediting body based in Cape Town, South Africa, that runs a healthcare accreditation program that is also accredited by ISQua, the International Society for Quality in Healthcare.

== King Faisal Hospital Rwanda Foundation (KFHRF) ==
The King Faisal Hospital Rwanda Foundation is currently in its beginning stages following an action plan that was approved by the hospital in October 2020. Within the health domain, the Foundation's major objectives will be to support researchers through funding, training, and facilitation in the dissemination of research data, establishing strategic relationships with academic, research-driven, and research-sponsoring institutions, and supporting training for medical researchers. As part of the social welfare that constitutes an integral part of the foundation, the hospital will financially assist patients who cannot afford medical care and will continue to sensitize the public on NCDs and congenital and surgical diseases for prevention and early consultation. Furthermore, the foundation will support surgical camps and outreach within the country in a bid to reduce long waiting lists in teaching hospitals. Finally, within the education domain, the foundation will promote new learning tools, including e-learning, and support continuing medical education (CME).
