= Diane Gashumba =

Rwandan minister of health

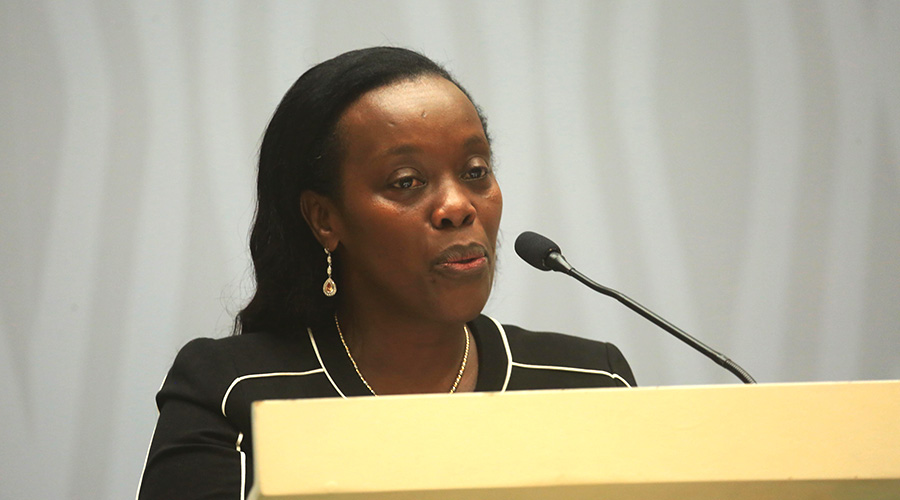

Cabinet Minister of Health Rwandan Cabinet
- In office October 4, 2016 – 14 February 2020
- Prime Minister: Édouard Ngirente
- Preceded by: Agnes Binagwaho
- Succeeded by: Daniel Ngamije

Personal details
- Born: Rwanda
- Citizenship: Rwanda
- Education: Doctor of Medicine; Master of Medicine in Pediatrics
- Occupation: Pediatrician, medical administrator, politician, diplomat
- Known for: Public service

Diane Gashumba is a Rwandan pediatrician, medical administrator, politician, diplomat and Rwandan Ambassador to the Kingdom of Sweden since June 12, 2021. She served as Minister of Health in the cabinet of Prime Minister Edouard Ngirente. She was appointed to that position on 4 October 2016.

Before that, from 26 March 2016 until 4 October 2016, Gashumba served as the Cabinet Minister of Gender and Family Promotion in the cabinet of Prime Minister Anastase Murekezi.

== Background and education ==
Gashumba holds a Doctor of Medicine (MD) and a Master of Medicine (MMed), specializing in Pediatrics.

== Career ==
According to the website of the Rwandan ministry of health, Gashumba had been practicing medicine for 17 years as of 2016. For a period of three years she served as the medical director of Kibagabaga Hospital and Muhima Hospitals. Between 2010 and 2016, she worked with a USAID-funded child and maternal health project as "Senior Team Leader" for quality and as "Deputy Chief of Party" The $57.3 million project covered 23 of Rwanda's 30 districts.

Since 2018, Gashumba has been serving on the joint World Bank/WHO Global Preparedness Monitoring Board (GPMB), co-chaired by Elhadj As Sy and Gro Harlem Brundtland.

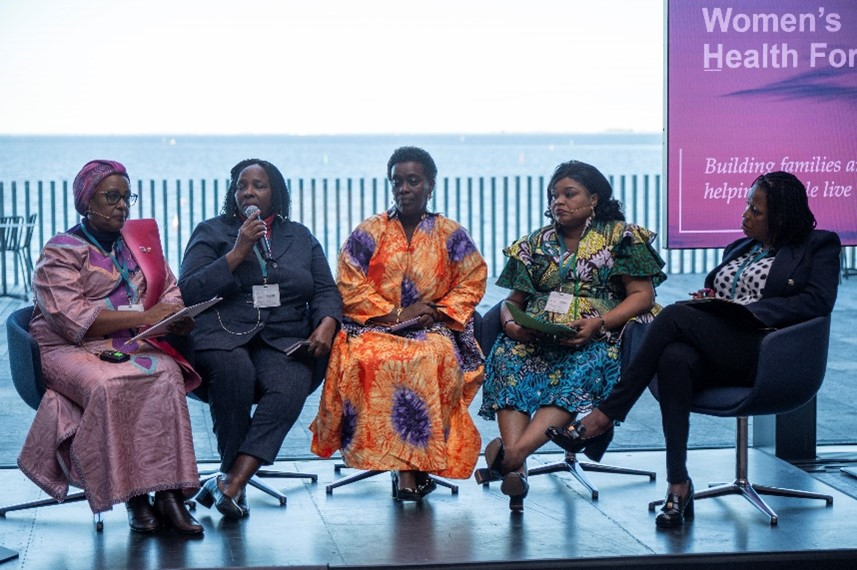
Left to R: Uganda's Margaret M. Otteskov, Angeline Kavindu Musili, MBS, Ambassador of the Republic of Kenya to the Nordics and Baltics; Gashumba, Sylvia Naa Adaawa Annoh, Ambassador of Ghana to Denmark & Sweden; and Priscilla Misihairabwi-Mushonga, Ambassador of Zimbabwe to the Nordics.

In October 2024 she participated in the Nordic-African Women’s Health Forum organised by the International Centre for Antimicrobial Resistance Solutions. She discussed "delivering for women’s and children’s well-being" with other delegates who included other notable ambassadors including Uganda's Margaret M. Otteskov and Zimbabwe's Priscilla Misihairabwi-Mushonga.

== Other activities ==
- RBM Partnership to End Malaria, Member of the Board (since 2019)

== See also ==
- Parliament of Rwanda
- Ministry of Health (Rwanda)
