= Corruption in Rwanda =

Corruption in Rwanda has attracted attention due to its government’s positioning as a champion of anti-corruption efforts. There is a notable improvement in terms of transparency and efficiency when compared with regional peers and this is driven by strong oversight institutions. However, this positive outlook is still marred by corruption challenges, which sometimes are obscured by the government’s focus on economic development and national unity.

== Anti-corruption framework ==
Rwanda stands out as a notable case in the fight against corruption. The country operates under a dictatorship that swiftly silences opposition and enforces loyalty and discipline across state institutions. However, unlike other authoritarian regimes in the region, which are characterized by a culture of impunity and corruption, the ruling Rwandan Patriotic Front (RPF) was able to lower the incidence of corruption in the country and achieve political stability through its strong grip on state institutions. Over the past decade, Rwanda has enjoyed a low incidence of corruption. It was markedly reduced between 2000 and 2018. By 2025, it scored 58 out of 100 in Transparency International’s Corruption Perception Index, following a steady increase since 2022 when the country posted a score of 51 out of 100. For comparison with regional scores, the best score among sub-Saharan African countries (Note: Angola, Benin, Botswana, Burkina Faso, Burundi, Cameroon, Cape Verde, Central African Republic, Chad, Comoros, Côte d'Ivoire, Democratic Republic of the Congo, Djibouti, Equatorial Guinea, Eritrea, Eswatini, Ethiopia, Gabon, Gambia, Ghana, Guinea, Guinea-Bissau, Kenya, Lesotho, Liberia, Madagascar, Malawi, Mali, Mauritania, Mauritius, Mozambique, Namibia, Niger, Nigeria, Republic of the Congo, Rwanda, Sao Tome and Principe, Senegal, Seychelles, Sierra Leone, Somalia, South Africa, South Sudan, Sudan, Tanzania, Togo, Uganda, Zambia, and Zimbabwe.) in 2025 was 68, the average was 32 and the worst was 9. For comparison with worldwide scores, the best score in 2025 was 89, the average was 42, and the worst was 9.

The key starting point to the effective Rwandan anti-corruption initiative was the long-term strategy called “Vision 2020”. It is part of President Paul Kagame’s move to convert the country from a subsistence agriculture economy to a knowledge-based society by 2020. The strategy depended on a capable state based on good governance as well as an efficient and competitive private sector. Part of the anti-corruption framework that drives Rwanda’s success story is the Office of the Ombudsman, which was established in 2003. It is mandated to investigate corruption cases and to promote transparency. This is augmented by the work of the Rwanda Governance Board (RGB), which regularly conducts surveys and disseminates reports on governance and corruption. Access to this data provides crucial insights for assessing the progress of anti-corruption measures and policies.

In 2012, the National Anti-Corruption Policy was also adopted and it established the government’s commitment to zero tolerance for corruption as well as to transparency and accountability. Specific measures related to this push include the digitization of government services. As public service is streamlined, opportunities for bribery and corruption are significantly reduced. Services and documents such as birth registration, driver’s license, and land transfers can already be accessed online, minimizing direct interactions with public officials. Rwanda passed the Anti-Corruption Law in 2018 further reinforcing its legal and regulatory measures against corruption. This legislation imposes severe punishment on individuals found guilty of corrupt practices. Specialized anti-corruption courts were also established and had expedited the prosecution of corruption cases.

One notable case that demonstrated the efficacy of these courts, which operate within Rwanda’s twelve intermediate courts, was the swift prosecution of the former Minister of State for Primary and Secondary Education, Dr. Isaac Munyakazi. He was sentenced to five years in prison for soliciting and receiving a bribe to influence the ranking of a private school. There was also the case of Dr. Sabin Nsanzimana, the Director General of the Rwanda Biomedical Centre. He was prosecuted in the courts for embezzlement and mismanagement of public funds.

== Challenges ==
Despite the strides made by the Rwandan government’s anti-corruption efforts, the problem still persists. Public procurement remains one of the critical areas of concern. According to organizations such as Global Integrity, there is still a lack of transparency in the process of the awarding of government contracts and this is supported by persistent allegations of favoritism and lack in competitive bidding. Some of the consequences are inflated costs and poor quality in public contracts. For example, the construction of the Kigali Convention Center was marred by irregularities in the procurement process, which led to increased cost and construction delays. The same happened in the case of the Rwanda Biomedical Centre where officials were accused of diverting funds intended for medical supplies.

It is also noted that the financing of political parties and candidates remains unregulated. There is no law that requires these to disclose the amount and identity of local funders. In addition, there is limited public access to information; the case is the same for public participation in the budget processes.

The restrictive political environment is also cited for its effect on transparency. It is challenging to determine the extent of corruption because specific cases are not accessible to the public. Political opposition, media, and civil society organizations face harassment, intimidation, and trumped-up charges, which undermine efforts to ensure full transparency and accountability in Rwanda’s anti-corruption initiatives.
