= Circ MedTech =

Defunct Israel medical device company

- Type: Private
- Industry: Medical devices
- Founded: 2009
- Founders: Oren Fuerst, Tzameret Fuerst, Ido Kilemnick, Shaul Shohat
- Defunct: 2019
- Fate: Liquidation
- Headquarters: Herzliya, Israel
- Key people: Tzameret Fuerst (CEO)
- Products: PrePex

Circ MedTech was an Israeli medical device company headquartered in Herzliya, Israel, that operated from 2009 to 2019. The company was known for developing PrePex, a non-surgical male circumcision device designed to help prevent HIV transmission in Africa.

Founded by Dr. Oren Fuerst, Tzameret Fuerst, Ido Kilemnick, and Shaul Shohat, the company emerged in response to a 2007 United Nations and World Health Organization (WHO) initiative promoting male circumcision to reduce HIV infection rates. PrePex received FDA approval in 2012 and WHO prequalification in 2016, with the device being used in multiple African countries.

Despite initial success and reported sales of 1.5 million units, the company ceased operations in 2019 following WHO concerns about increased tetanus risk associated with the device. The company claimed based on WHO statistics regarding circumcision and AIDS prevention, that its PrePex device had saved an estimated 250,000 lives during its period of use.

== Founding ==
Based in Herzilya, Israel, Circ MedTech was founded in 2009 by Dr. Oren Fuerst, Tzameret Fuerst, Ido Kilemnick and Shaul Shohat. The company was founded in the wake of a 2007 plan by the United Nations and the World Health Organization (WHO) to promote male circumcision as a way to prevent HIV infection and AIDS in Africa. Scientific research had shown male circumcision reduced by 60% the chances of being infected by HIV from heterosexual intercourse. Public health authorities hope to circumcise 20 million adult men in Africa by 2015 to slow the continent's AIDS epidemic, which spread chiefly through heterosexual sex.

== PrePex ==
In 2012, Circ MedTech released PrePex, a medical device designed for non-surgical adult male circumcision, manufactured in the Tefen Industrial Zone in the Upper Galilee. With PrePex, the procedure could be performed by a two-nurse team in an outpatient setting without requiring a surgeon or anesthesia. The technique involved inserting a specialized grooved ring beneath the foreskin and securing it with an elastic band to create controlled compression. After approximately one week, the tissue naturally detached in a manner similar to umbilical cord separation, or it could be removed without pain. The device's simple, cost-effective design made it particularly suitable for widespread public health initiatives, according to the New York Times and Haaretz. It was developed as an intervention to help reduce HIV transmission, as studies demonstrated that male circumcision can lower the risk of HIV infection. This approach offered an alternative to traditional surgical circumcision methods, particularly in resource-limited settings where access to surgical facilities may have been restricted.

In January 2012, the U.S. Food and Drug Administration (FDA) approved PrePex, with approval from the WHO for use on adults over the age of 18 on 31 May 2013. PrePex was the first device to receive official WHO approval that was an alternative to an operation, paving the way for distribution of PrePax throughout Africa.

In August 2012, the company announced PrePex would be tested in at least nine African countries in 2013. The U.S. President's Emergency Plan for AIDS Relief (PEPFAR) would pay for PrePex circumcisions for about 2,500 men in Lesotho, Malawi, South Africa, Tanzania and Uganda, while the Bill and Melinda Gates Foundation would pay for studies in Kenya, Mozambique, South Africa, Zambia and Zimbabwe. Then-CEO Tzameret Fuerst, said in an interview with TheMarker that PrePex would help to circumcise 20 million men by 2015.

In 2017, Rwanda's Ministry of Health cleared PrePex for use as part of an nationwide initiative to expand the use of non-surgical adult male circumcisions. It was estimated that PrePex would enable up to 700,000 men between the ages of 15 and 49 to be circumcised.

Based on the success of the initial trails, PrePex was later granted WHO prequalification on May 31, 2016, for use with males age 13 and above in 14 African countries. By that date, more than 125,000 PrePex procedures had been conducted in 12 countries: Botswana, Kenya, Lesotho, Malawi, Rwanda, South Africa, Swaziland, Tanzania, Uganda, Zambia, Zimbabwe and Indonesia.

== Decline and closure ==
In late 2014, concerning reports emerged from Rwanda and Uganda of three tetanus cases among PrePex circumcision patients, with two fatalities. These incidents triggered a cascade of events that would ultimately lead to the device's downfall. The Global Fund to Fight AIDS, Tuberculosis and Malaria, which had been in extended negotiations for a major agreement, abruptly withdrew from discussions. By then, PrePax was being used in Rwanda, Uganda and Kenya. There was controversy over the device's potential approval in South Africa due to opposition from the Congress of South African Trade Unions over the device's progeny in Israel.

The landscape shifted further in 2015 when a competing device, the Shang Ring from China, received approval. This device operated on similar non-surgical principles as PrePex. Despite this competition, PrePex continued to report strong sales, with hundreds of thousands of units sold through 2016, and studies documented high patient satisfaction rates.

However, 2016 brought a devastating setback when the WHO revised its previous position, announcing that PrePex procedures carried a higher risk of tetanus compared to traditional surgical circumcision. This declaration proved catastrophic for the device's future, particularly given that tetanus vaccines were not readily available in many African communities, especially in remote areas.

Circ MedTech continued operations for several more years, ultimately claiming total sales of 1.5 million units before ceasing production and marketing in 2019. The company entered liquidation in August of that year. According to Tzameret Fuerst, based on WHO statistics regarding circumcision and AIDS prevention, the device had saved an estimated 250,000 lives during its period of use.
