= Health in Rwanda =

Life expectancy development in Rwanda

The quality of health in Rwanda has historically been very low, both before and immediately after the 1994 genocide. In 1998, more than one in five children died before their fifth birthday, often from malaria. But in recent years Rwanda has seen improvement on a number of key health indicators. Between 2005 and 2013, life expectancy increased from 55.2 to 64.0, under-5 mortality decreased from 106.4 to 52.0 per 1,000 live births, and incidence of tuberculosis has dropped from 101 to 69 per 100,000 people. The country's progress in healthcare has been cited by the international media and charities. The Atlantic devoted an article to "Rwanda's Historic Health Recovery". Partners In Health described the health gains "among the most dramatic the world has seen in the last 50 years".

Despite these improvements, however, the country's health profile remains dominated by communicable diseases, and the United States Agency for International Development has described "significant health challenges", including the rate of maternal mortality, which it describes as "unacceptably high", as well as the ongoing HIV/AIDS epidemic.

The Human Rights Measurement Initiative finds that Rwanda is fulfilling 93.3% of what it should be fulfilling for the right to health based on its level of income. When looking at the right to health with respect to children, Rwanda achieves 100.0% of what is expected based on its current income. In regards to the right to health amongst the adult population, the country achieves only 94.4% of what is expected based on the nation's level of income. Rwanda falls into the "fair" category when evaluating the right to reproductive health because the nation is fulfilling 85.5% of what the nation is expected to achieve based on the resources (income) it has available.

== Maternal and child health ==
Rwanda is on track in fulfilling the 4th and 5th Millennium Development Goals. In terms of the maternal mortality ratio, it reduced from 1,400 deaths per 100,000 live births in 1990 to 320 deaths per 100,000 live births in 2013. This was with an average annual rate of reduction to 8.6 from 2000 to 2013. Due to a variety of reasons such as poverty, poor roads due to the hilly terrain in the rural areas, misleading traditional beliefs and inadequate knowledge on pregnancy related issues, 31 percent of the women end up delivering at home despite having a public health insurance scheme. Some of the solutions which have been sought to the challenges include the training of more community health workers (village health teams) to sensitize the community, on top of providing them with mobile phones to contact the health facilities in emergency situations such as heamorrhage. The number of ambulances to some of the rural health centres have also been increased. According to a recent report by WHO most of the pregnant women die from hemorrhage (25%), hypertension (16%), abortion and sepsis (10% each) and a small number die from embolism (2%).

The demand for family planning was satisfied for 71% by 2010; the number of women who went for antenatal visits four or more times went up to 35% in 2010, which may have led to the observed increase in the number of pregnant women seeking a skilled attendant at delivery from 26% in 1992 to 69% in 2010. In terms of prevention of mother-to-child transmission of HIV, in 2010 the percentage of HIV and pregnant women receiving anti-retroviral drugs rose from 67% to 87% in 2012. 45 percent of women between the ages of 15 and 49 use family planning methods. Rwandan women on average, give birth to 4.6 children throughout their lifetime (RDHS 2010).

Health Indicators in children	Number
Stillbirth rate per 1,000 total births (2009)	23.0
Neonatal mortality rate per 1,000 live births (2012)	20.9
Number of neonatal deaths (2012)	9,263
Infant mortality rate per 1,000 live births(2012)	38.8
Number of infant deaths (2012)	17,154
Under 5 mortality rate (2012)	55.0
Number of under 5 deaths (2012)	23,603

Prevalence of some diseases is declining, including the elimination of maternal and neonatal tetanus. In 1990 there were 163 under five deaths for every 1000 live births. In 2010, 91 children died before their fifth birthday for every 1000 live births, often from diarrhoea, malaria or pneumonia. However, this figure is improving steadily. In 2017, the child mortality rate in the worst-achieving district in Rwanda was estimated at 57 deaths for every 1000 live births, 58% lower than the mortality rate in the best-achieving district in 2000.

In 1990, the percentage of children immunized against measles was roughly estimated to be 82% and by 2012 it had increased dramatically to 98% coverage of measles, 3 doses of hepatitis B, 3 doses if pnuemoccal conjugatevaccine and 3 doses of DTP. Exclusive breast feeding rate increased to 85%. This can be explained by a number of factors such as increased awareness among the populations both rural and urban through education programmes as well as improved coverage of effective interventions. This has been significant in the prevention and treatment of the major causes of child mortality.

The number of malnourished children in Rwanda still poses a challenge. The percentage of children under 5 years who were moderately or severely underweight decreased from 24 percent in 1992 to 18% in 2005 to 12% in 2012. Stunting reduced slightly from 57% in 1990 to 44% in 2010.

== HIV/AIDS ==
In the post-genocide era, the Global Fund to Fight AIDS, Tuberculosis and Malaria (Global Fund) and the US President’s Emergency Plan for AIDS Relief (PEPFAR) were mainly used for HIV programmes in Rwanda. In June 2012, 113 people with advanced HIV disease in Rwanda were receiving anti-retroviral therapy, making Rwanda (along with much richer Botswana) one of only two countries in sub-Saharan Africa to achieve the United Nations goal of universal access to antiretroviral therapy. Rwanda’s HIV epidemic has remained at a prevalence of about 3% for the past seven years. In reference to the gapminder graph, a comparison between the life expectancy versus the number of people living with HIV (number, all ages). It illustrates that between 1989 and 1990, the number of people living with HIV was 181,838 with a life expectancy of 48 years. During the 1994 genocide, the number increased to 200,000 with a life expectancy of 6 years. In the post genocide era, 1995 the numbers were still the same but the life expectancy had increased to 40 years as now HIV programmes had gradually begun. In 2011, the figures were still the same but life expectancy shot up to 63 years which showed that the number of people receiving the anti-retrovirals and had increased leading to more people living longer.

== Malaria ==
The entire population of Rwanda is at risk of malaria. Transmission is mesoendemic (having regular seasonal transmission) in the plains and prone to epidemics in the high plateaus and hills. In endemic zones, malaria transmission occurs year-round with seasonal peaks in May–June and November–December.

Rwanda made remarkable progress in the fight against malaria from 2005 to 2012, during which time there was an 86 percent reduction in malaria incidence and 74 percent reduction in malaria mortality. However, between 2012 and 2016, Rwanda saw just over an 8-fold increase in reported malaria cases. The increase was observed countrywide but largest in the Eastern and Southern provinces. Although malaria cases increased dramatically, only small increases were noted in severe cases and deaths, with substantial reductions in case fatality rates indicating strong malaria case management.

Although more analysis is needed to understand the complex interplay of factors, the Malaria and Other Parasitic Diseases Division of Rwanda's Ministry of Health attributes the increase in malaria cases in part to expanded access to healthcare, inadequate coverage with effective bednets, agricultural environmental modifications, mosquito resistance to pyrethroid insecticides, and change in mosquito behavior towards outdoor biting. With increasing malaria cases seen throughout the region, trans-border movement of people might also contribute to transmission.

== Tuberculosis ==
Expansion and enhancement of Directly Observed Treatment Short-course (DOTS) in the six point Stop Tuberculosis (TB) strategy described by Laserson and Wells has been implemented in Rwanda by the health ministry's integrated program to combat leprosy and TB since 1990. This has led to treatment success rates rising from 58% (2003) to 81% by late 2006. In 2005, the case detection percentage for TB was 24%, which was below the target for case detection.

== Water and sanitation ==
From 1990 to 2012, an improvement in the drinking water coverage was registered from 59% to 67% and the use of surface water reduced from 25% to 11%. There was also an improvement in the sanitation coverage from 1990 to 2012. This was from 30% to 64%. The unimproved sanitary facilities reduced further from 59% to 23%, while open defecation reduced from 7% to 3%.

== See also ==
- Healthcare in Rwanda
- COVID-19 pandemic in Rwanda

== Sources ==
- Bowdler, Neil (14 May 2010). "Apprentice adviser Nick Hewer's Rwanda mission". BBC News. London.
- Drobac, Peter; Naughton, Brienna (15 June 2014). "Health Equity in Rwanda: The New Rwanda, Twenty Years Later". Harvard International Review. Cambridge, Massachusetts. Archived from the original on 8 December 2015.
- Emery, Neal (20 February 2013). "Rwanda's Historic Health Recovery: What the U.S. Might Learn". The Atlantic. Washington, D.C.
- Kabalira, Marie-Brigitte (30 January 2012). "Country on course to reduce infant deaths, but huge task ahead". Rwanda Focus.
- Rosenberg, Tina (3 July 2012). "In Rwanda, Health Care Coverage That Eludes the U.S." The New York Times. New York, N.Y.
- United Nations Children's Fund (UNICEF) (19 July 2012). "Rwanda: Statistics". Archived from the original on 20 March 2014.
- United States Agency for International Development (USAID) (III) (2015). "Rwanda: Global Health". Archived from the original on 25 February 2013.
- World Bank (IV). "Mortality rate, under-5 (per 1,000 live births)".
- World Bank (VII). "Life expectancy at birth, total (years), graph".
- World Bank (VIII). "Mortality rate, under-5 (per 1,000 live births), graph".
- World Bank (IX). "Incidence of tuberculosis (per 100,000 people), graph".
- World Health Organization (WHO) (2009). WHO Country Cooperation Strategy, 2009–2013: Rwanda (PDF). ISBN 978-92-9031-135-5. Archived from the original (PDF) on 19 October 2010.
- World Health Organization (WHO) (2015). WHO Country Cooperation Strategy at a glance: Rwanda (PDF). Archived from the original (PDF) on 25 October 2013.
