= COVID-19 pandemic in Rwanda =

- Disease: COVID-19
- Pathogen: SARS-CoV-2
- Location: Rwanda
- First outbreak: Wuhan, China
- Index case: Kigali
- Arrival date: 14 March 2020 (6 years, 2 months and 4 days)
- Confirmed cases: 133,274 (updated 16 May 2026)
- Recovered: 131,112 (17 November 2022)
- Deaths: 1,468 (updated 16 May 2026)
- Fatality rate: 1.33%
- Vaccinations: 11,425,742 total vaccinations 7,011,427 first doses 4,381,843 second doses 32,472 booster shots

The COVID-19 pandemic in Rwanda was a part of the worldwide pandemic of coronavirus disease 2019 (COVID-19) caused by severe acute respiratory syndrome coronavirus 2 (SARS-CoV-2). The virus was confirmed to have reached Rwanda in March 2020. Rwanda's response to the pandemic has received international praise for its effectiveness. Despite limited resources, the country's well organised healthcare system, rapid deployment of testing procedures and high public trust in medical authorities have led to a successful public health response. As of 15 December 2021, there were 100,763 total confirmed cases, 1,344 confirmed deaths, 7 million first vaccine shots, and 1 critical case.

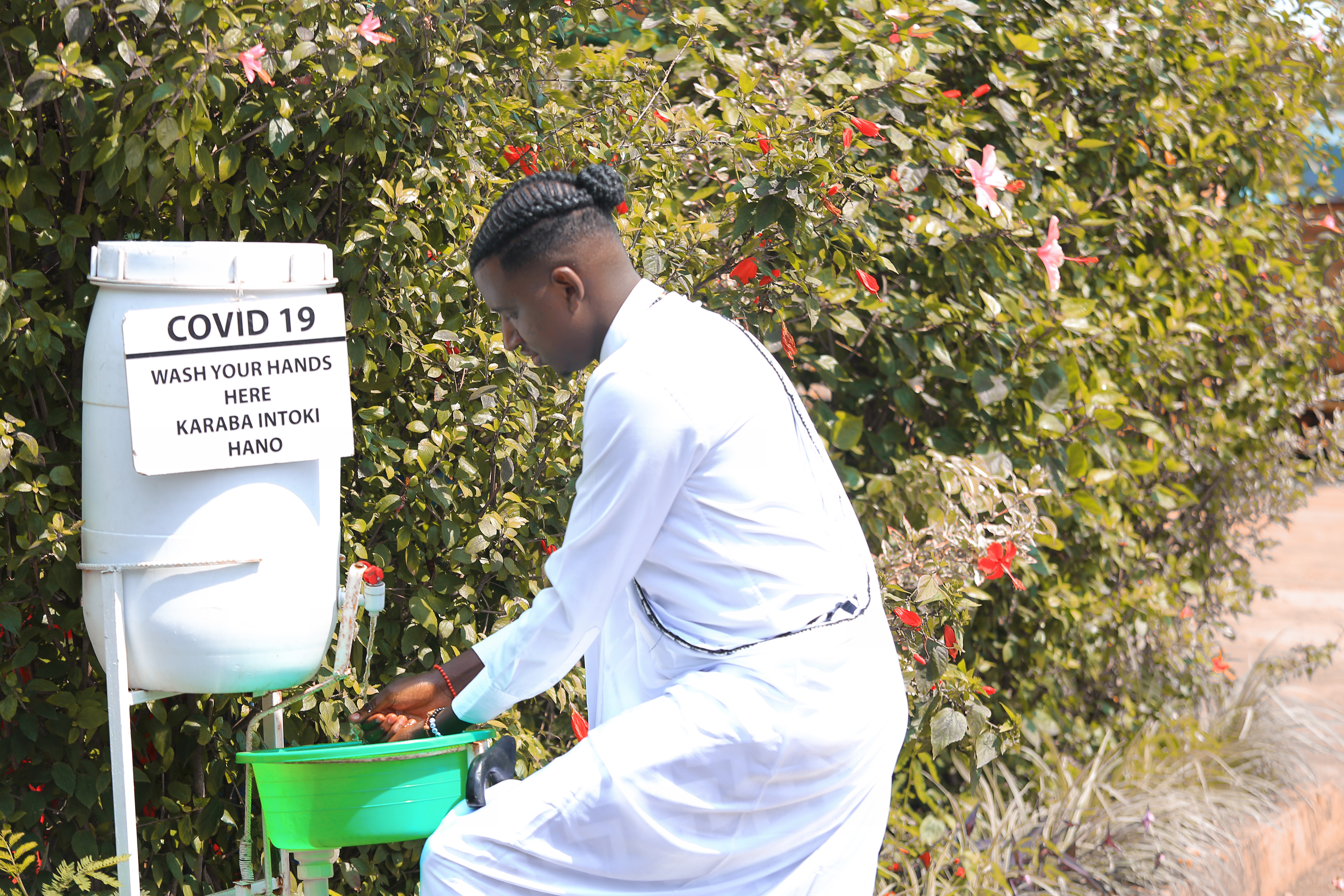
A hand sanitization station in Rwanda.

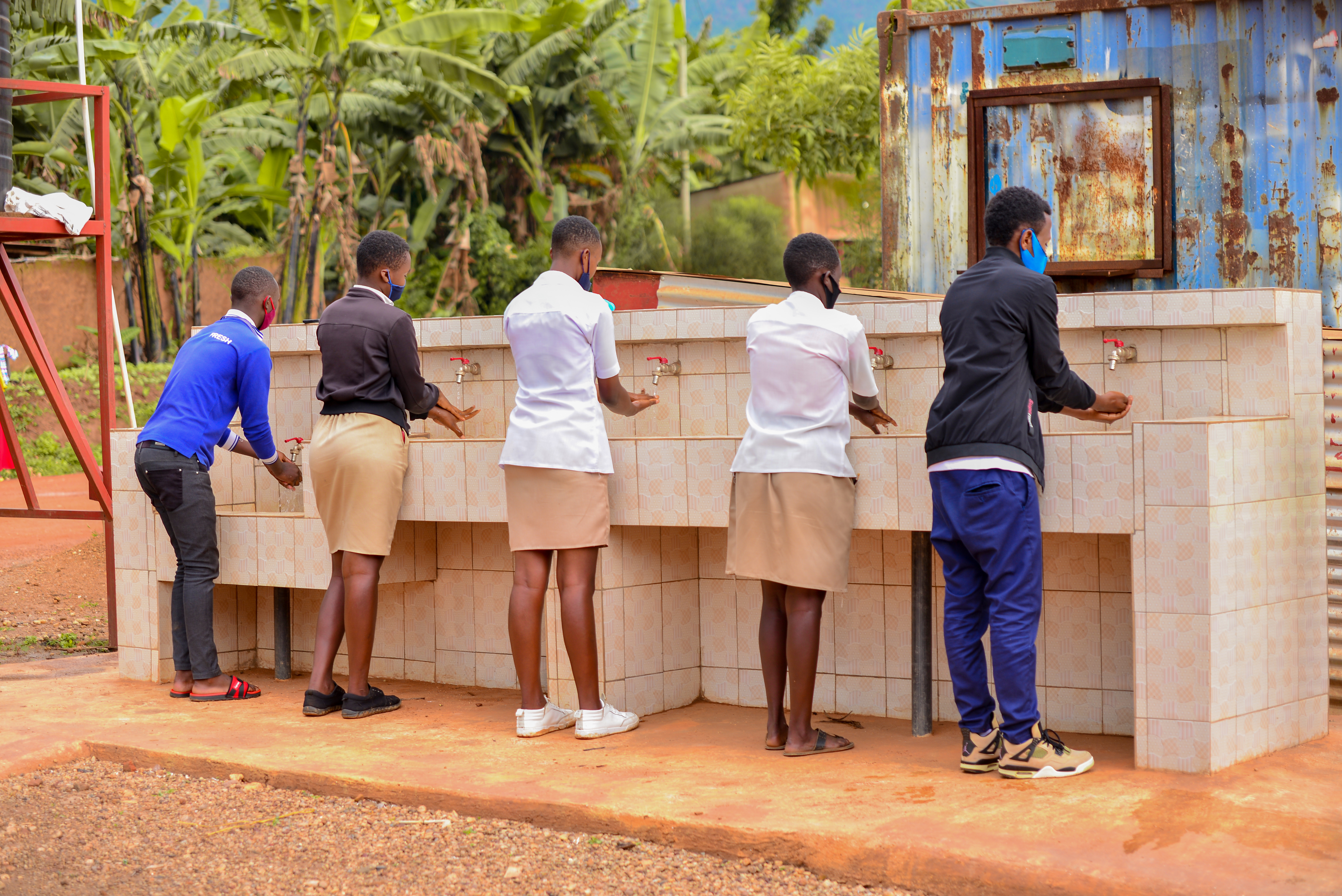
Students in Rwanda wearing face masks and sanitizing before entering classrooms to aid prevention of COVID-19

== Background ==
On 12 January 2020, the World Health Organization (WHO) confirmed that a novel coronavirus was the cause of a respiratory illness in a cluster of people in Wuhan City, Hubei Province, China, which was reported to the WHO on 31 December 2019.

The case fatality ratio for COVID-19 has been much lower than SARS of 2003, but the transmission has been significantly greater, with a significant total death toll. Model-based simulations for Rwanda indicate that the 95% confidence interval for the time-varying reproduction number R_{t} exceeded 1.0 in November and December 2020.

== Timeline ==
=== March 2020 ===
- The first case of COVID-19 in Rwanda was confirmed on 14 March 2020. Four other people were tested after the first case tested positive, bringing the number of cases to five.
- By 16 March, Rwanda confirmed two more cases in Kigali, bringing the total number of cases in the country to seven. In an attempt to stop the spread of coronavirus, the Rwandan Ministry of Health announced on 18 March, via Twitter, that all international commercial passenger flights would be suspended for 30 days, with effect from 20 March. Less than a day later, on 21 March, officials announced a two-week lockdown. Both public and private employees are to work from home, under strict measures. All borders are also to be closed, cargo and Rwandan nationals being exempt, with a mandatory 14-day quarantine.
- On 28 March, the Ministry of Health recorded six new COVID-19 cases, taking the total of those diagnosed with the virus to 60.
- By the end of March there were 75 confirmed cases, no deaths and no recoveries.

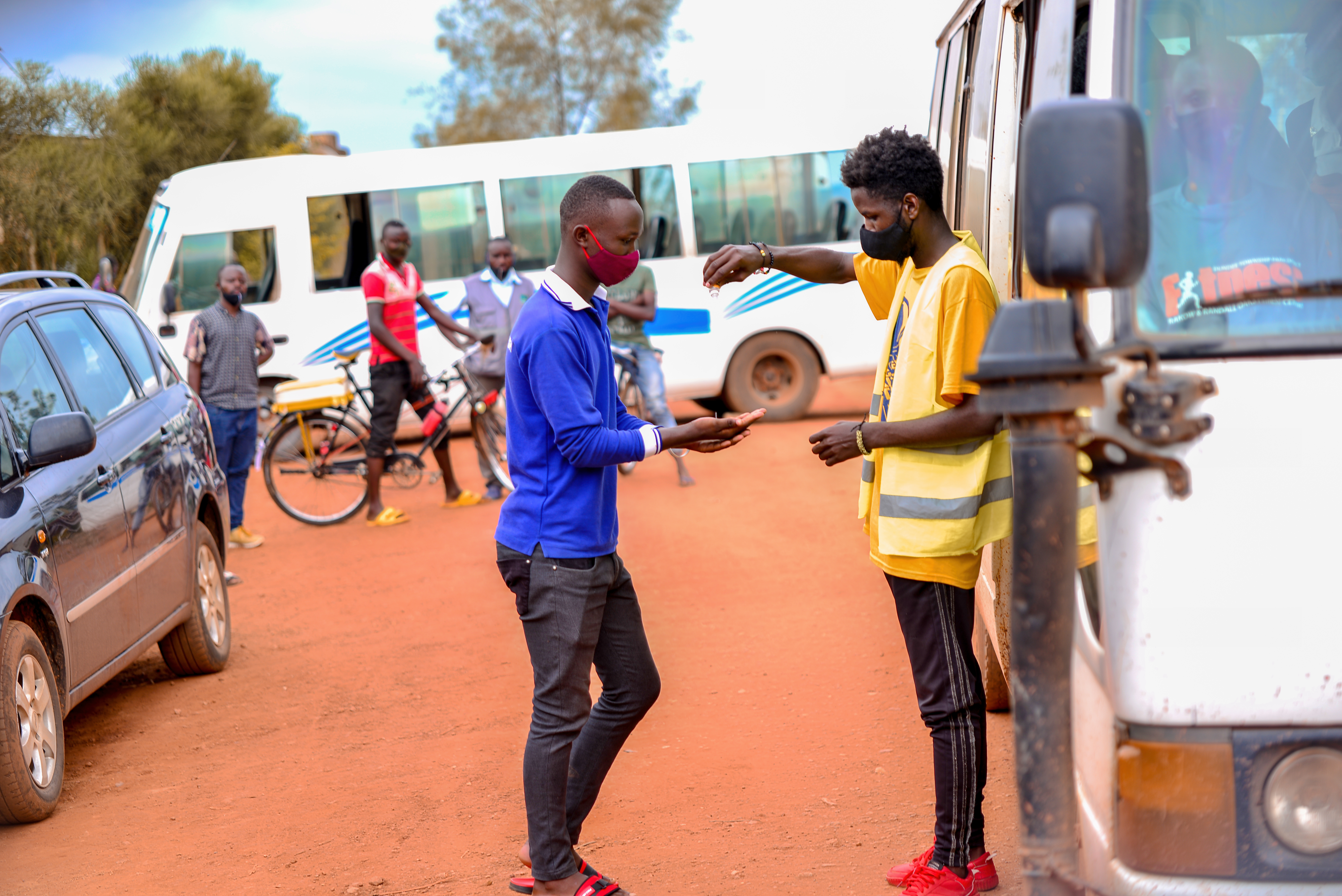
Sanitizing a passenger at a bus park to support prevention of COVID-19 in Rwanda.

=== April to June 2020 ===
- On 9 April, three new cases of coronavirus were identified, out of 720 samples examined in the previous 24 hours. This brought the total number of confirmed cases to 113 people (of which seven had recovered).
- In April there were 168 new cases, bringing the total number of cases to 243. 104 patients recovered, leaving 139 active cases at the end of the month.
- On 31 May, the first death was confirmed. The number of confirmed cases stood at 370 (up by 127 from the end of April). The number of recovered patients increased by 152 to 256, leaving 113 active cases.
- A cluster of cases in the Rusizi District of western Rwanda, on the border of the Democratic Republic of the Congo, caused the number of confirmed cases to spike. This, together with a smaller cluster in the Rusumo on the eastern border with Tanzania, sent the number of confirmed cases from 370 at the end of May, to 572 by 14 June.
- During June there were 655 new cases, raising the total number of cases to 1025. The death toll doubled to 2. The number of recovered patients increased by 191 to 447, leaving 576 active cases at the end of the month.

=== July to September 2020 ===
- Rwanda was the only sub-Saharan state listed whose citizens and residents are able to travel to the European Union from July.
- There were 997 new cases in July, raising the total number of confirmed cases to 2022. The death toll more than doubled to 5. The number of recovered patients increased by 659 to 1106, leaving 911 active cases at the end of the month (an increase by 58% from the end of June).
- In August, the number of confirmed cases more than doubled to 4063 with 1941 new cases. The death toll more than tripled to 16. At the end of the month there were 2034 active cases, more than twice as many as the end of July.
- There were 773 new cases in September, bringing the total number of confirmed cases to 4836. The death toll rose to 29. The number of recovered patients increased to 3125, leaving 1682 active cases at the end of the month.

=== October to December 2020 ===
- There were 301 new cases in October, bringing the total number of confirmed cases to 5137. The death toll rose to 35. The number of recovered patients increased to 4879, leaving 223 active cases at the end of the month.
- There were 797 new cases in November, bringing the total number of confirmed cases to 5934. The death toll rose to 49. The number of recovered patients increased to 5516, leaving 369 active cases at the end of the month.
- There were 2449 new cases in December, raising the total number of confirmed cases to 8383. The death toll rose to 92. The number of recovered patients increased to 6542, leaving 1749 active cases at the end of the month.

=== January to March 2021 ===
- There were 6921 new cases in January, taking the total number of confirmed cases to 15304. The death toll more than doubled to 196. The number of recovered patients increased to 10087, leaving 5021 active cases at the end of the month.
- With the spike in COVID-19 infections, the decision was made on 15 January to postpone the 2021 Tour du Rwanda, the largest and most popular professional road cycling race in the country, from the end of February to the beginning of May.
- There were 3546 new cases in February, taking the total number of confirmed cases to 18850. The death toll rose to 261. The number of recovered patients increased to 17313, leaving 1276 active cases at the end of the month.
- Mass vaccination commenced on 5 March, initially with 240,000 doses of AstraZeneca's Covishield vaccine and 102,960 doses of the Pfizer–BioNTech COVID-19 vaccine.
- There were 2933 new cases in March, taking the total number of confirmed cases to 21783. The death toll rose to 307. The number of recovered patients increased to 20182, leaving 1294 active cases at the end of the month. 348,926 persons were vaccinated in March.

=== April to June 2021 ===
- There were 3333 new cases in April, taking the total number of confirmed cases to 25116. The death toll rose to 335. The number of recovered patients increased to 23234, leaving 1547 active cases at the end of the month. 945 persons were vaccinated in April, bringing the total number to 349,871.
- With global cases of COVID-19 on the rise, particularly in India and other parts of Asia, the decision was taken by the Secretary General of the Commonwealth, Patricia Scotland, and President Paul Kagame to postpone the Commonwealth Heads of Government meeting, which was set to take place in Kigali in June. This was the event's second postponement in as many years.
- There were 1907 new cases in May, taking the total number of confirmed cases to 27023. The death toll rose to 357. The number of recovered patients increased to 25850, leaving 816 active cases at the end of the month. 529 persons were vaccinated in May, bringing the total number to 350,400.
- There were 12024 new cases in June, raising the total number of confirmed cases to 39047. The death toll rose to 438. The number of recovered patients increased to 27272, leaving 11337 active cases at the end of the month. The number of vaccinations increased to 391,805.

=== July to September 2021 ===
- There were 31651 new cases in July, taking the total number of confirmed cases to 70698. The death toll rose to 808. The number of fully vaccinated persons increased to 455,673.
- There were 16929 new cases in August, taking the total number of confirmed cases to 87627. The death toll rose to 1089. The number of fully vaccinated persons increased to 660,402.
- There were 9890 new cases in September, taking the total number of confirmed cases to 97517. The death toll rose to 1273.

=== October to December 2021 ===
- There were 2181 new cases in October, bringing the total number of confirmed cases to 99698. The death toll rose to 1331. The number of recovered patients increased to 97642, leaving 725 active cases at the end of the month.
- There were 651 new cases in November, bringing the total number of confirmed cases to 100349. The death toll rose to 1342. The number of fully vaccinated persons increased to 3,452,598.
- Rwanda's first six cases of the omicron variant were announced on 14 December.
- There were 11437 new cases in December, bringing the total number of confirmed cases to 111786. The death toll rose to 1350. The number of fully vaccinated persons increased to 5,502,525. Modelling by WHO's Regional Office for Africa suggests that due to under-reporting, the true cumulative number of infections by the end of 2021 was around 5.9 million while the true number of COVID-19 deaths was around 1866.

=== January to March 2022 ===
- There were 17105 new cases in January, bringing the total number of confirmed cases to 128891. The death toll rose to 1440. The number of fully vaccinated persons increased to 7,092,862.
- There were 611 new cases in February, bringing the total number of confirmed cases to 129502. The death toll rose to 1457. The number of fully vaccinated persons increased to 7,821,022.
- There were 220 new cases in March, bringing the total number of confirmed cases to 129722. The death toll rose to 1459. The number of fully vaccinated persons increased to 8,146,164.

=== April to June 2022 ===
- There were 112 new cases in April, bringing the total number of confirmed cases to 129834. The death toll remained unchanged. The number of recovered patients increased to 128347, leaving 28 active cases at the end of the month. The number of fully vaccinated persons increased to 8,380,667.
- There were 218 new cases in May, bringing the total number of confirmed cases to 130052. The death toll remained unchanged. The number of recovered patients increased to 128529, leaving 64 active cases at the end of the month. The number of fully vaccinated persons increased to 8,510,067.
- There were 969 new cases in June, bringing the total number of confirmed cases to 131021. The death toll rose to 1460. The number of fully vaccinated persons increased to 8,657,341.

=== July to September 2022 ===
- There were 1246 new cases in July, bringing the total number of confirmed cases to 132267. The death toll rose to 1466. The number of recovered patients increased to 130403, leaving 398 active cases at the end of the month.
- There were 172 new cases in August, bringing the total number of confirmed cases to 132439. The death toll remained unchanged.
- There were 65 new cases in September, bringing the total number of confirmed cases to 132504. The death toll remained unchanged. The number of recovered patients increased to 131027, leaving 11 active cases at the end of the month.

=== October to December 2022 ===
- There were 80 new cases in October, bringing the total number of confirmed cases to 132584. The death toll rose to 1467. The number of fully vaccinated persons increased to 8,966,693.
- There were 178 new cases in November, bringing the total number of confirmed cases to 132762. The death toll remained unchanged. The number of recovered patients increased to 131112, leaving 183 active cases at the end of the month. The number of fully vaccinated persons increased to 9,274,948.
- There were 158 new cases in December, bringing the total number of confirmed cases to 132920. The death toll rose to 1468.

=== January to December 2023 ===
- There were 288 confirmed cases in 2023, bringing the total number of confirmed cases to 133208. The death toll remained unchanged.

== Statistics ==
=== Weekly Confirmed COVID-19 Cases in Rwanda ===
- The data for the next graphs was collected and cleaned from the organization Our World in Data – COVID-19, as part of a current project titled Data Analysis and Visualization (DAV) at the University of Warsaw (UW).
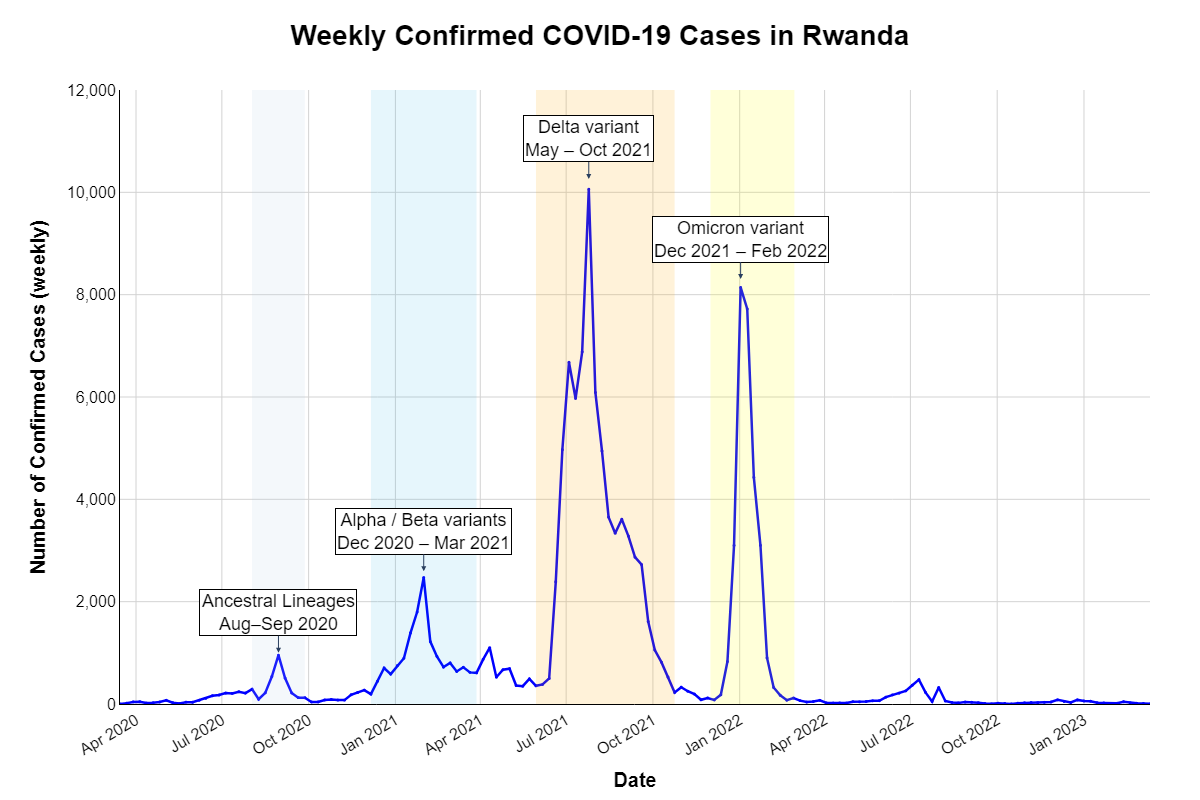
  The data for this graph was collected and cleaned from the organization Our World in Data – COVID-19, as part of a current project titled Data Analysis and Visualization (DAV) at the University of Warsaw (UW).

=== Weekly Confirmed COVID-19 Deaths in Rwanda ===
- The data for this graph was also collected and cleaned from the organization Our World in Data – COVID-19
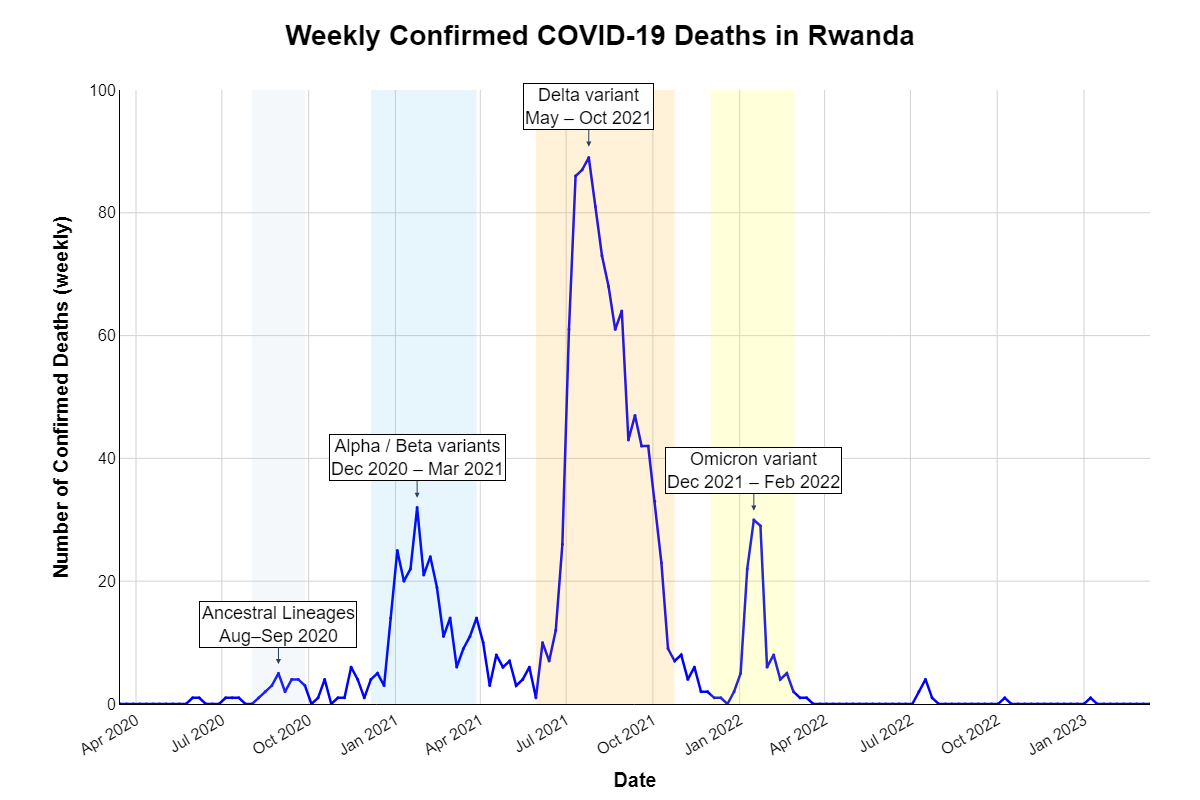
  The data for this graph was collected and cleaned from the organization Our World in Data – COVID-19, as part of a current project titled Data Analysis and Visualization (DAV) at the University of Warsaw.

=== COVID-19 Vaccination Progress in Rwanda ===
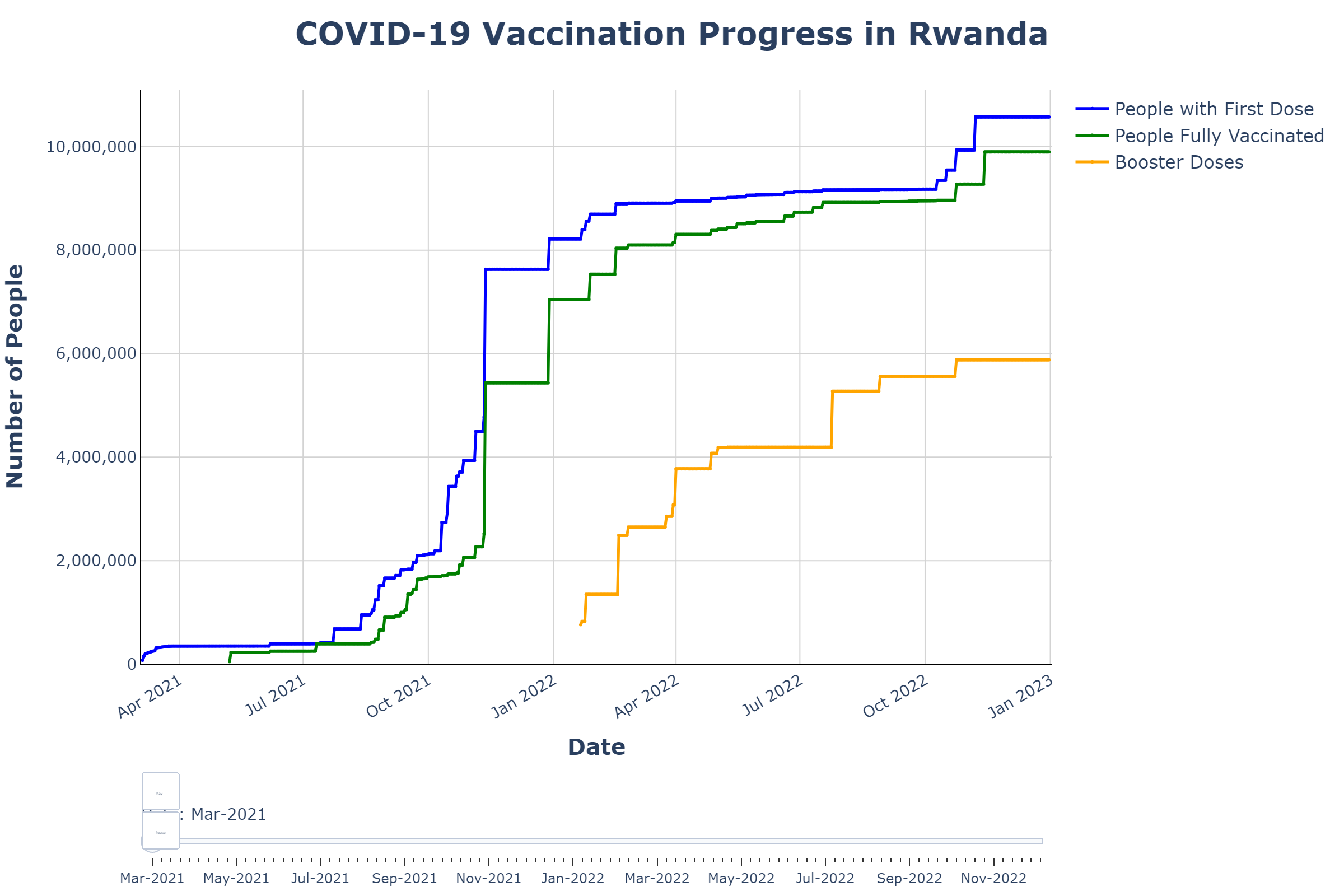
The data for this graph was collected and cleaned from the organization Our World in Data – COVID-19, and shows vaccination Progress in Rwanda. this work is part of a current project titled Data Analysis and Visualization (DAV) at the University of Warsaw (UW).

=== Confirmed COVID-19 cases in Rwanda, South Africa, and Poland – a comparison ===
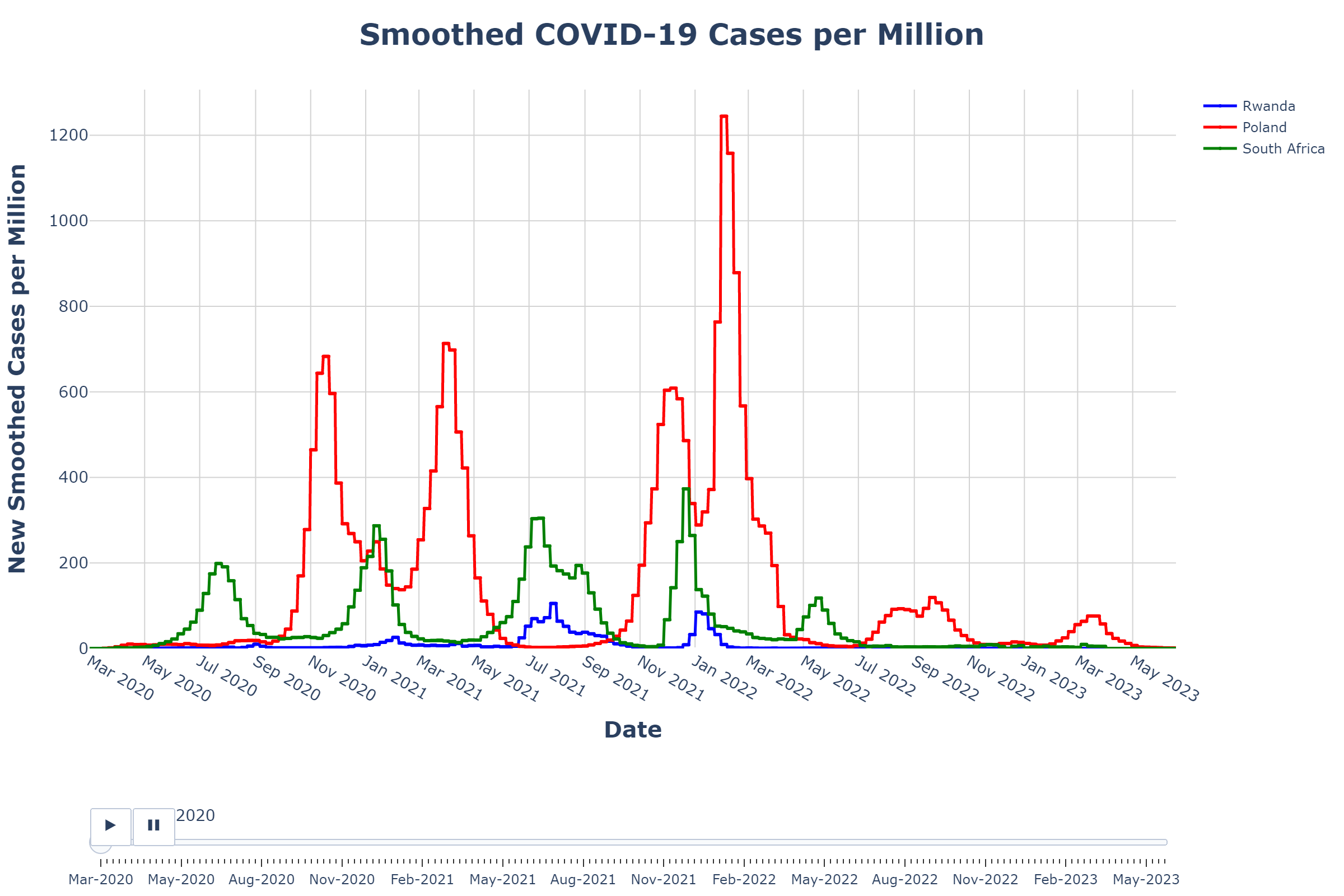
Confirmed COVID-19 cases in Rwanda, South Africa, and Poland – a comparison, The data for this graph was collected and cleaned from the organization Our World in Data – COVID-19, and shows vaccination Progress in Rwanda. this work is part of a current project titled Data Analysis and Visualization (DAV) at the University of Warsaw (UW).

=== COVID-19 Stringency Index comparison Over time – Rwanda, Poland, South Africa ===
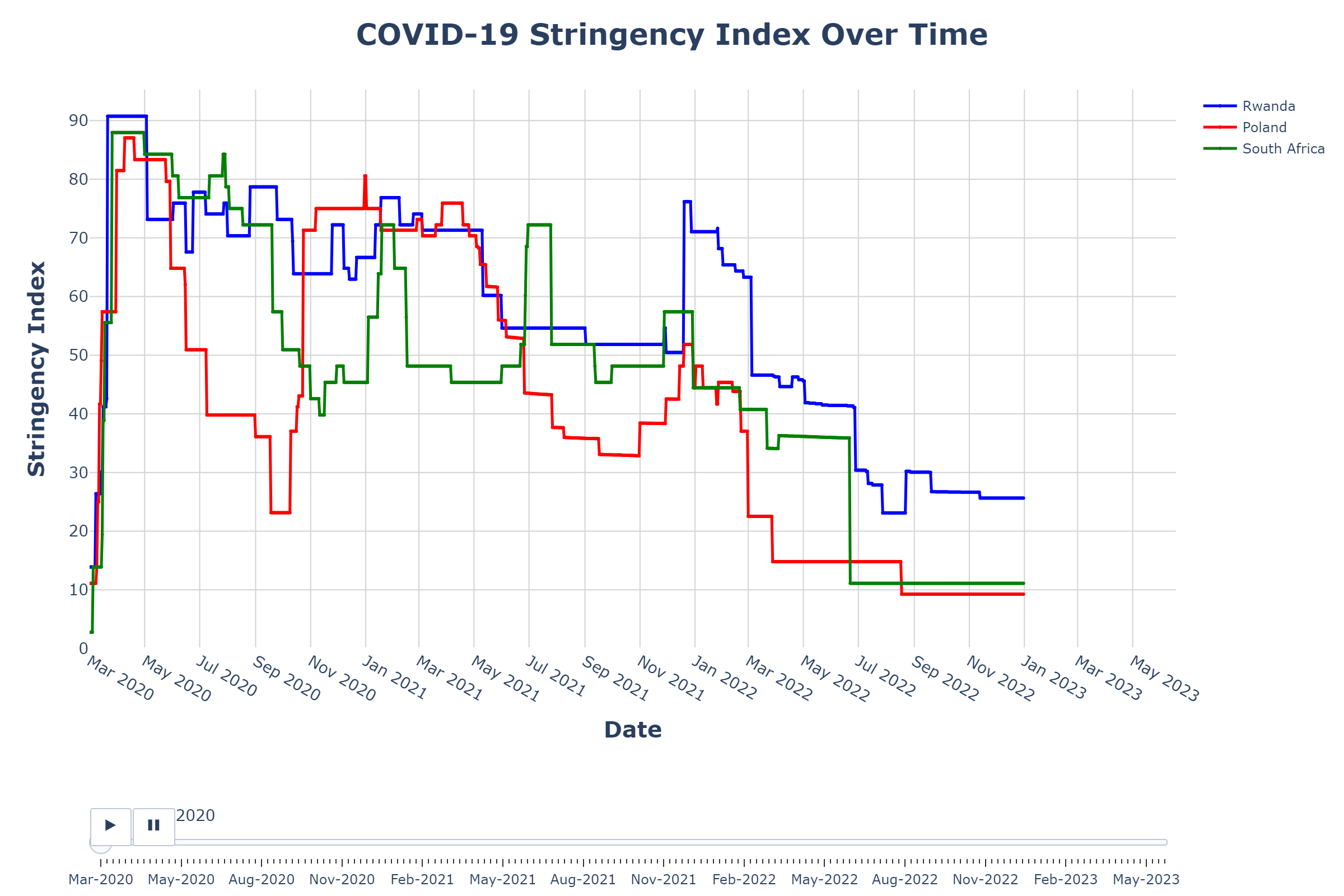
COVID-19 Stringency Politics Index comparison Over time - Rwanda, Poland, South Africa

== Government reaction ==
Sabin Nsanzimana has said that all COVID-positive patients were taken to a treatment centre for monitoring.

In addition to the lockdown measures taken in March (see above), Rwanda National Police on 12 April announced the usage of drones to deliver messages to local communities on how to combat the coronavirus.

In January 2021 additional restrictions were introduced in Kigali.

== Impact ==
=== Education ===
On 14 March 2020, the Government of Rwanda closed all schools in the country due to the COVID-19 pandemic. Schools remained closed until November 2020, when a phased reopening began with students returning to the grade they were in before the closures (thereby effectively repeating the year). During the closures various steps were implemented by the Rwanda Education Board to enable remote learning. These included national TV and radio broadcasts, the launch of a dedicated YouTube Channel and improved online resources for teachers. Despite these efforts there is evidence that many pupils experienced little or no education during the closure period. Research has indicated that fewer than half of teachers may have been able to support students' remote learning and that students from poor and rural families may have benefited the least from the distance learning measures. Concerns were also raised by head teachers and teachers about weak learners, over-aged students, girls and poor students potentially dropping out of education.

== See also ==
- COVID-19 pandemic in Africa
- COVID-19 pandemic by country and territory
