= Yvan Butera =

Rwandan Medical doctor and Politician

Minister of state at Ministry of Health
- In office November, 2022 – -present
- Appointed by: Paul Kagame
- Preceded by: Tharcisse Mpunga

Personal details
- Born: April 1990 Rwanda
- Spouse: Diana Kamili (m. 2022)
- Education: University of Rwanda; University of Global Health Equity; University of Liège
- Occupation: Public servant and Politician
- Profession: Medical doctor
- Portfolio: Human Genetics

Yvan Butera (born 1990), is a Rwandan physician and public health official who serves as the Minister of State in the Ministry of Health of Rwanda, overseeing public health and primary healthcare. He was appointed to the position in November 2022. Prior to his ministerial appointment, he served in both medical and administrative roles across Rwanda’s health system, including five years at Rwanda Military Hospital and later as Deputy Executive Secretary at Ministry of Health.

As Minister of State, Butera has been involved in Rwanda reforms aimed at improving access to essential healthcare services, including the expansion of dialysis, kidney transplant, and mental health services. He is an advocate for integrating new technologies into Rwanda’s health system.

== Education ==
Butera born in April 1990, he attended IFAK in Kimihurura and Lycée de Kigali for high school studies. He obtained his Doctor of Medicine (MD) from the University of Rwanda in 2014 and later earned a Master of Science in Global Health Delivery from the University of Global Health Equity. Butera also holds a PhD in Human Genetics from the University of Liège, Belgium.

== Political career ==
In November 2022, Butera was appointed Minister of State in the Ministry of Health. In this role, he oversees Rwanda’s public health and primary care systems. During his tenure, Rwanda has scaled up advanced procedures such as kidney transplants, with over 40 performed locally by early 2025, and over 500 heart surgeries carried out within the country by the first time.

In the mental health sector, the health ministry introduced ketamine-based treatments for depression and suicide prevention in partnership with King Faisal Hospital, marking a step in mental healthcare advancement. Under the 4x4 Government Health Reform, Butera was involved in a major scale-up in Rwanda’s healthcare training, tripling student enrollment and expanding institutions to boost the workforce and reduce preventable deaths.

Butera has represented Rwanda in international health meetings promoting African solutions to public health challenges and calling for greater collaboration in vaccine production and emergency preparedness.

== Personal life ==
Butera is married to Diana Kamili, they were officially wed in a civil ceremony in Kigali on December 21, 2022.
