= Angeline Kavindu Musili =

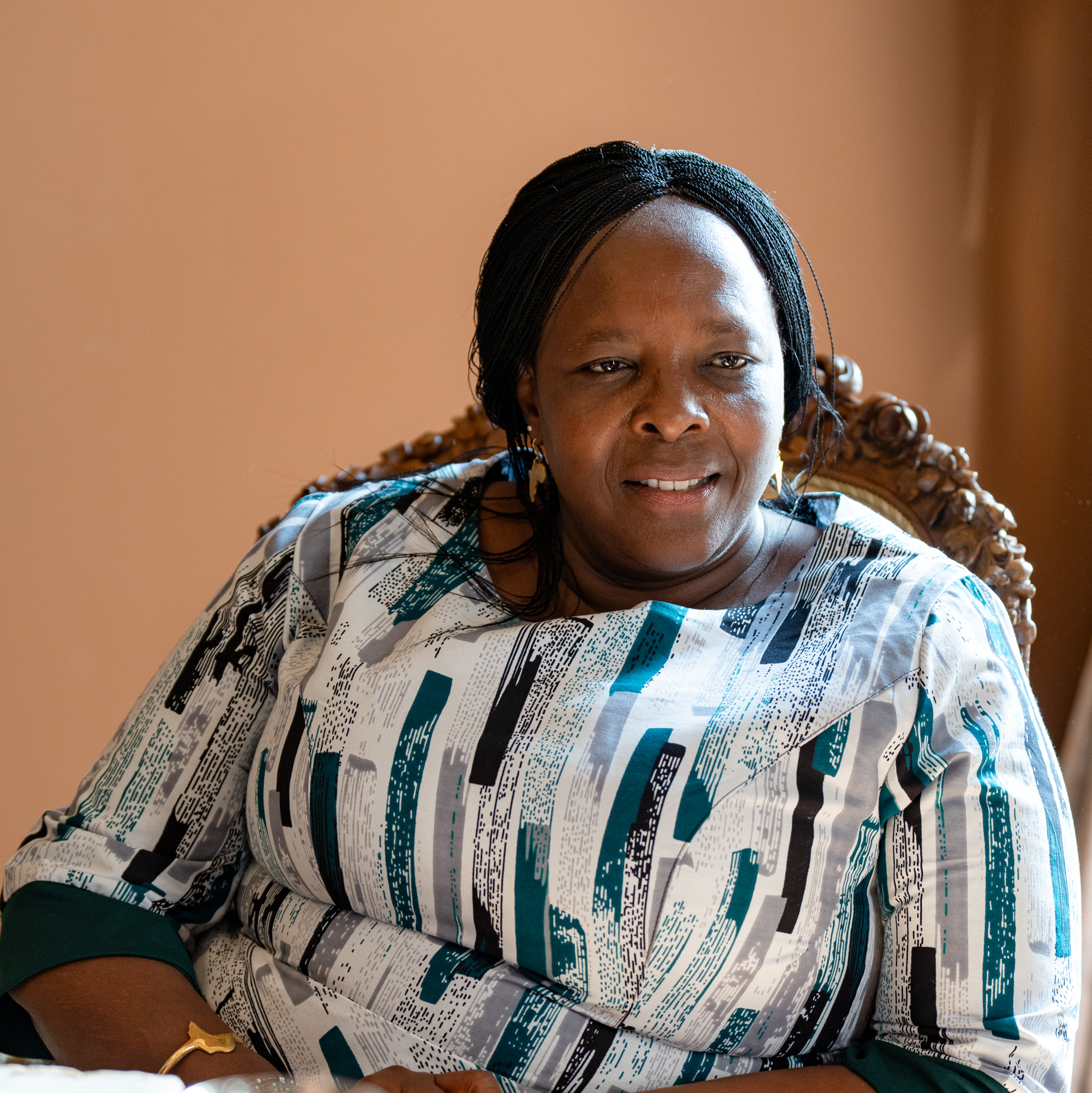
- Born: Machakos, Kenya
- Occupation: Diplomat
- Known for: Ambassadorship to Nordic countries
- Awards: Order of the Burning Spear

Angeline Kavindu Musili is a diplomat. She has served as the Ambassador of the Republic of Kenya to the Nordics and Baltic countries. In 2023, she became the first Kenyan ambassador to Latvia, for which she received the Order of the Burning Spear from the Kenyan government.

== Life ==
Musili was born in Machakos, Kenya. She became a diplomat in July 1987, with her first position as secretary in the Ministry of Foreign and Diaspora Affairs and later served at High Commission of Kenya in Harare and Cairo. She was put forward as a candidate to serve as an ambassador and had led the Ministry's Americas and Caribbean Directorate from May 2022. She was a prospective ambassador and plenipotentiary and she was interrogated by the Defence, Intelligence And Foreign Relations Committee which was chaired by Nelson Koech.

They interviewed 27 candidates in November 2023. Musili's stated she wanted to improve the health, water, and sanitation of those living in Kenyan slums.

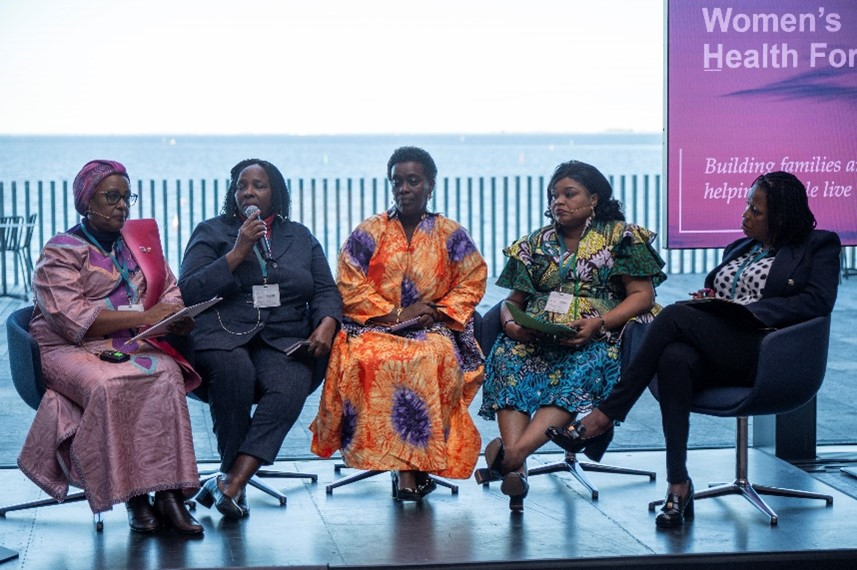
L to R: Margaret M. Otteskov, Angeline Kavindu Musili, Kenyan Ambassador; Dr. Diane Gashumba, Rwandan Ambassador, Sylvia Annoh, Ambassador of Ghana and Priscilla Misihairabwi-Mushonga, Ambassador of Zimbabwe

The candidates names were reported to parliament for their approval. She was appointed as an ambassador to Sweden and worked in Stockholm. The King of Sweden received her accreditation in February 2024. In March 2024, she proposed a mobile embassy to supply a consular service in support of the wider Kenyan diaspora. At the end on 2023 the President of Kenya awarded Musili with the Order of the Burning Spear in recognition of her service.

In October 2024 Musili participated in the Nordic-African Women’s Health Forum organised by the International Centre for Antimicrobial Resistance Solutions. She discussed wellbeing for women and children with other delegates including Nordic-African women ambassadors such as Margaret M. Otteskov of Uganda, Rwanda's Diane Gashumba and Zimbabwe's Priscilla Misihairabwi-Mushonga.

Musili also became Kenya's first ambassador to Latvia and she was accredited in September 2024. In December she met the King of Norway who accepted her accreditation.
