= Priscilla Misihairabwi-Mushonga =

Zimbabwean politician

The Right Honourable Priscilla Misihairabwi-Mushonga
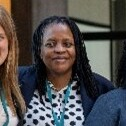

Minister of Regional Integration and International Cooperation of Zimbabwe
- In office 13 February 2009 – 2013
- Prime Minister: Morgan Tsvangirai

Personal details
- Born: Glen Norah, Harare
- Party: MDC–M

Priscilla Misihairabwi-Mushonga is a Zimbabwean politician and Ambassador to the Kingdom of Sweden. During her time as Glen Norah's MP, she also served as the shadow foreign minister for the Movement for Democratic Change. When the party split in 2005, she remained with the MDC formation and was elected Deputy Secretary-General of that party. She has been representing her party in the Zimbabwean political negotiations.

== Political career ==
In 2009 she was appointed Minister of Regional Integration and International Cooperation. In the government of national unity in the 2011 MDC congress she was elected the party's Secretary General, a position she will hold until the next congress in 2016. She is the MDC chief representative at JOMIC (Joint Monitoring and Implementation Committee) and COPAC, the Constitutional Parliamentary Committee, a committee in charge of writing the Zimbabwean constitution.

In October 2024 she participated in the Nordic-African Women’s Health Forum organised by the International Centre for Antimicrobial Resistance Solutions. She discussed "delivering for women’s and children’s well-being" with other delegates who included other notable Nordic-African women ambassadors including Kenya's Angeline Kavindu Musili, Margaret M. Otteskov of Uganda, Rwanda's Diane Gashumba and Zimbabwe's Priscilla Misihairabwi-Mushonga.

== Personal life ==
She was widowed after her husband, Dr Christopher Mushonga, died from injuries inflicted on him during a botched robbery.
