= Agnes Binagwaho =

Rwandan pediatrician

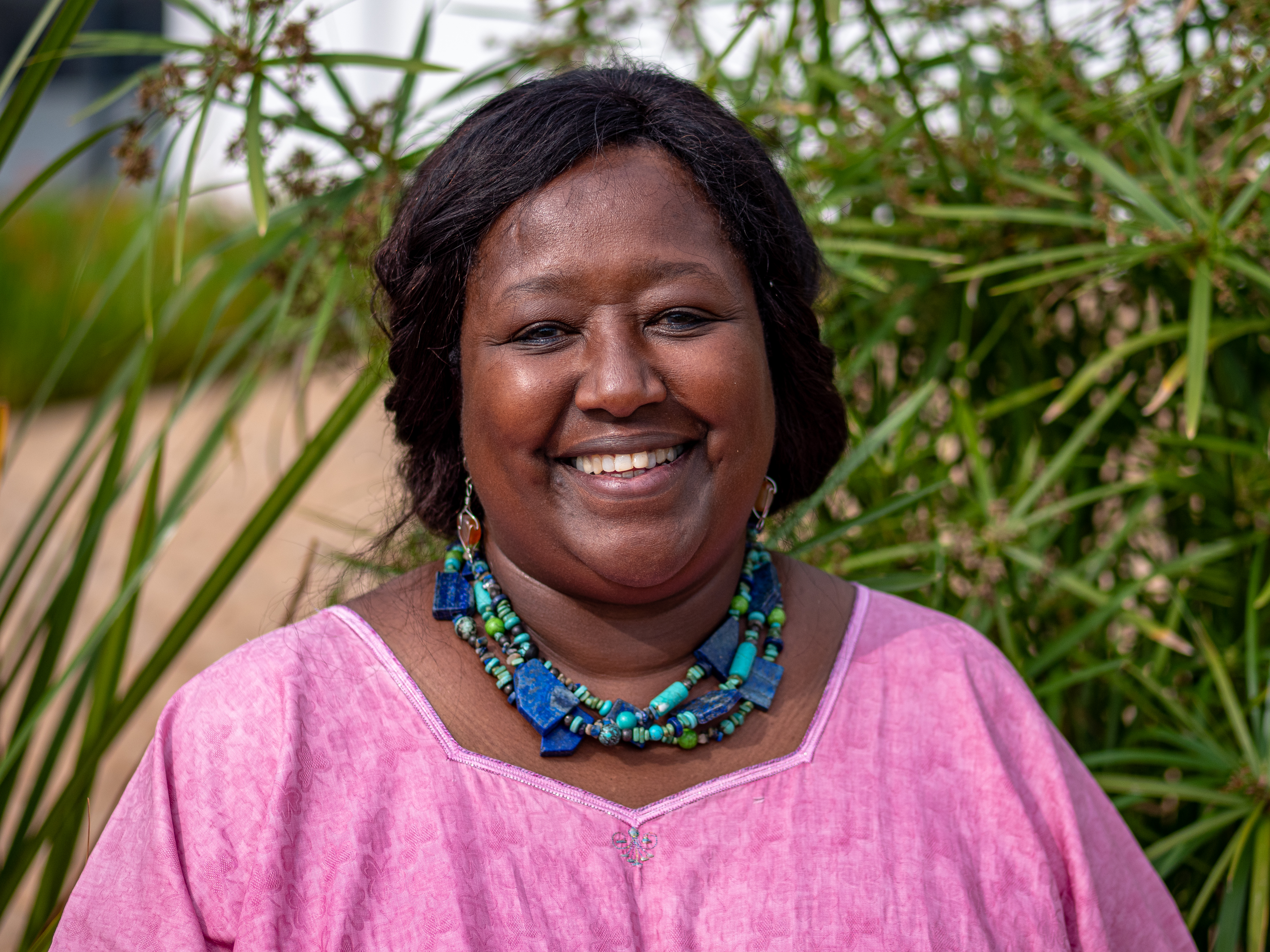
- Professor at UGHE
- Born: Rwanda
- Education: Université libre de Bruxelles; Université de Bretagne Occidentale; University of Rwanda
- Occupations: Senior Lecturer, Department of Global Health and Social Medicine, Harvard Medical School; Adjunct Clinical Professor of Pediatrics, Geisel School of Medicine at Dartmouth

Agnes Binagwaho is a Rwandan politician, pediatrician, co-founder and the former vice chancellor of the University of Global Health Equity (2017-2022). In 1996, she returned to Rwanda where she provided clinical care in the public sector and held several positions including the position of Permanent Secretary for the Ministry of Health of Rwanda from October 2008 until May 2011 and Minister of Health from May 2011 until July 2016. She has been a professor of global health delivery practice since 2016 and a professor of pediatrics since 2017 at the University of Global Health Equity. She has served the health sector in various high-level government positions. She resides in Kigali.

== Early life and education ==
Binagwaho was born in Nyamagabe, Southern Province, Rwanda. When she was three years old, she and her family moved to Belgium where her father was completing his medical degree. She completed her medical degree (MD) in general medicine at the Université libre de Bruxelles from 1976 to 1984 and her master's degree in pediatrics (MA) at the Université de Bretagne Occidentale from 1989 to 1993. In 2010, she was awarded an honorary Doctor of Science from Dartmouth College in the United States. In 2014, she became the first person to be awarded Doctorate of Philosophy (PhD) from the College of Medicine and Health Sciences at the University of Rwanda. Her PhD dissertation was titled, "Children's Right to Health in the Context of the HIV Epidemic: The Case of Rwanda".

Binagwaho earned a Certificate of Tropical Medicine from the Institute of Tropical Medicine Antwerp, Belgium, between 1984 and 1985. At the Université de Bretagne Occidentale, she completed three certificates: a Certificate in Axiology (General Emergencies) (1991-1992); a Certificate in Pediatric Emergencies (1992-1993); and a Certificate in HIV Patient Care and Treatment (1994-1995). She returned to Rwanda in July 1996, two years after the 1994 genocide against the Tutsi. From July to August 1997, she completed a training program in AIDS prevention and surveillance studies in Kigali through the World AIDS Foundation, hosted by the University of New Mexico School of Medicine's Health Sciences Center. From November 2009 to April 2010, she completed a certificate in Health and Human Rights - Dimensions and Strategies with InWEnt - Capacity Building International (Internationale Weiterbildung und Entwicklung gGmbH) She was also awarded a Social and Behavioral Research Investigators Certificate by the US-based organization Citi Collaborative Institutional Training Initiative.

== Career ==
Binagwaho began her clinical practice in Belgium and France, where she completed her medical education. She specialized in pediatrics, after earning her master's in pediatrics, she sub-specialized in emergency medicine for adults and children, and the treatment of HIV/AIDS in children and adults. She worked intensely in neonatology and when she returned to Rwanda in 1996, She worked for 20 years in the public health sector in Rwanda, first as a clinician in public hospitals for four years. Afterward, she worked in various high-level government positions between 2002 and 2016, serving first as the Executive Secretary of Rwanda's National AIDS Control Commission, then as the Permanent Secretary of the Ministry of Health, and lastly as the Minister of Health for five years.

Binagwaho was a member of The Global Fund's Rwanda Country Coordinating Mechanism (CCM) from 2002 to 2008. From 2006 to 2009, she co-chaired the Joint Learning Initiative on Children and HIV/AIDS (JLICA), an independent alliance of researchers, implementers, policymakers, activists, and people living with HIV. She served on the Rwandan High Level Implementation Committee of the Aid Policy from 2006 to 2008. She was also a member of the Multi-Country Support Program on SSR/HIV/AIDS Steering Committee and the Advisory Body of the Royal Tropical Institute in Amsterdam, Netherlands, from 2004 to 2009.

From 2001 until 2005, Binagwaho also held the position of co-chair of the United Nations Task Force of Millennium Development Goals Project for HIV/AIDS and Access to Essential Medicines, under the leadership of Jeffrey Sachs for the Secretary General of the United Nations.

In 2004, she also served on the Health Advisory Board for Time magazine. She sat on the editorial board for the Public Library of Science. She also served on the United Nations Tracking and Accountability Working Group, co-chairing with Margaret Biggs (CIDA) and Margaret Chan (WHO) and reporting to the Director General of the United Nations, Secretary-General Ban Ki-moon. She was also a member of the Join Action Plan for Women's and Children's Health this same year as a Member of the Innovation Working Group.

Binagwaho served as the Permanent Secretary of the Ministry of Health of Rwanda from October 2008 to May 2011 and as the Executive Secretary of Rwanda's National AIDS Control Commission from 2002 to 2008. During the time that she served as the Executive Secretary of Rwanda's National AIDS Control Commission from 2002 to 2008, she was also the chair of the Rwandan Steering Committee for the United States President's Emergency Plan for AIDS Relief (PEPFAR). In addition, she was responsible for the management of the World Bank MAP Project in Rwanda.

Binagwaho served as the Minister of Health of Rwanda from May 2011 until July 2016. On July 12, 2016, after five years of service, Rwanda's President Paul Kagame relieved her of her duties.

From 2013 to 2015, she was a member of the International Advisory Board for Lancet Global Health Journal. She was a Founding Board Member of the Tropical Institute of the Community Health and Development in Africa, based in Kisumu, Kenya. Additionally, she served on the advisory board of the Friends of the Global Fund Africa, and the Advisory Committee of the International AIDS Vaccine Initiative. She also served on the International Strategic Advisory Board for the Institute of Global Health Innovation at Imperial College London. In addition, she served an Advisory Committee Member of the Disease Control Priorities 3 (DCP3).

Prof. Binagwaho is the former Vice Chancellor of the University of Global Health Equity (2017-2022).

== Later career ==
=== Teaching ===
Since 2008, Binagwaho has been a senior lecturer in the Department of Global Health and Social Medicine at Harvard Medical School. She is also a professor of the practice of global health delivery and a professor of pediatrics at the University of Global Health Equity in Rwanda as well as an adjunct clinical professor of pediatrics at the Geisel School of Medicine at Dartmouth. Currently, Professor Binagwaho serves as a faculty affiliate to the Center for African Studies at Harvard University.

=== Other activities ===
In 2019, Binagwaho joined the Rockefeller Foundation board of trustees and became a member of the executive advisory board for the Wellcome Trust Global Monitor.

In 2022, she became a member of the Global Advisory Board for the Economist Impact project on Confidence in Scientific Research, a member of the community of trustees for the Cummings Foundation and a board member for the International Center for Research on Women.

Since 2010, Binagwaho has served as a member of the Global Task Force on Expanded Access to Cancer Care and Control in Developing Countries. Binagwaho is a member of the joint scientific committee for the Coalition for Epidemic Preparedness Innovations/ China Ministry of Science and Technology. Binagwaho is a member of the Africa Europe Strategy Group on Health and serves on the Women Leaders Network at the Africa Europe Foundation.

She is a member of the Science Innovation Platform for Rwanda. She serves as the co-chair of the expert panel of the Commonwealth Road Safety Initiative. She serves as chair for the steering committee for the Clearly Research Program. Since 2021, she serves as co-chair for the International Conference for Public Health in Africa. She also recently joined the Scientific committee organizing the 5th Edition of the Forum Galien Afrique.

Binagwaho also serves as the co-chair of the Science & Strategic Advisory Council (SSAC) for the International COVID-19 Data Research Alliance and as co-chair for the Global Health and COVID-19 Task Force for the T20. Since 2021, she is a member of the African Commission on COVID-19 for the African Union. Most recently, Professor Binagwaho joined as advisor for the Stanford Research Coordinating Center to Support Climate Change and Health Community of Practice.

Binagwaho is a member of the editorial board for the Health and Human Rights and the Health Economics and Management Review. She also serves on the editorial team of Annals of Global Health and on the editorial board of the International Journal Of Health Policy And Management. Since 2017, Binagwaho has been on the editorial board for the East African health research journal and a member of the editorial board for the Bulletin of the World Health Organization.

Binagwaho is a fellow at The African Academy Of Sciences, the National Academy Of Medicine in the United States. Recently, under the umbrella of the National Academy of Sciences, Medicines and Engineering she has become a member of the Global Forum on Innovation in Health Professional Education. She is also a fellow for The World Academy of Sciences(TWAS) for the Advancement Of Science In Developing Countries where she serves on the TWAS Policy Development and Future Action (PDFA) Committee for the year 2021–2022.

== Research and activism ==
Binagwaho's studies and publications aim to improve access to prevention, care and treatment for HIV/AIDS and other diseases. Binagwaho has spoken frequently about the significant role research has played in improving health in her country. Her PhD dissertation focused on the analysis of missed opportunities for children affected by HIV to fulfil their human right to health.

When she was serving as Minister of Health, Binagwaho launched a series of online discussions through Twitter on topics related to global health policy and Rwanda's national health sector. During her tenure as Minister, Twitter users from around Rwanda and the world joined her in biweekly discussions using #MinisterMondays. In December 2011, she partnered with the Rwandan-American ICT company Nyaruka to allow Rwandans who did not have access to the Internet to contribute their questions and comments to #MinisterMondays discussions via SMS.

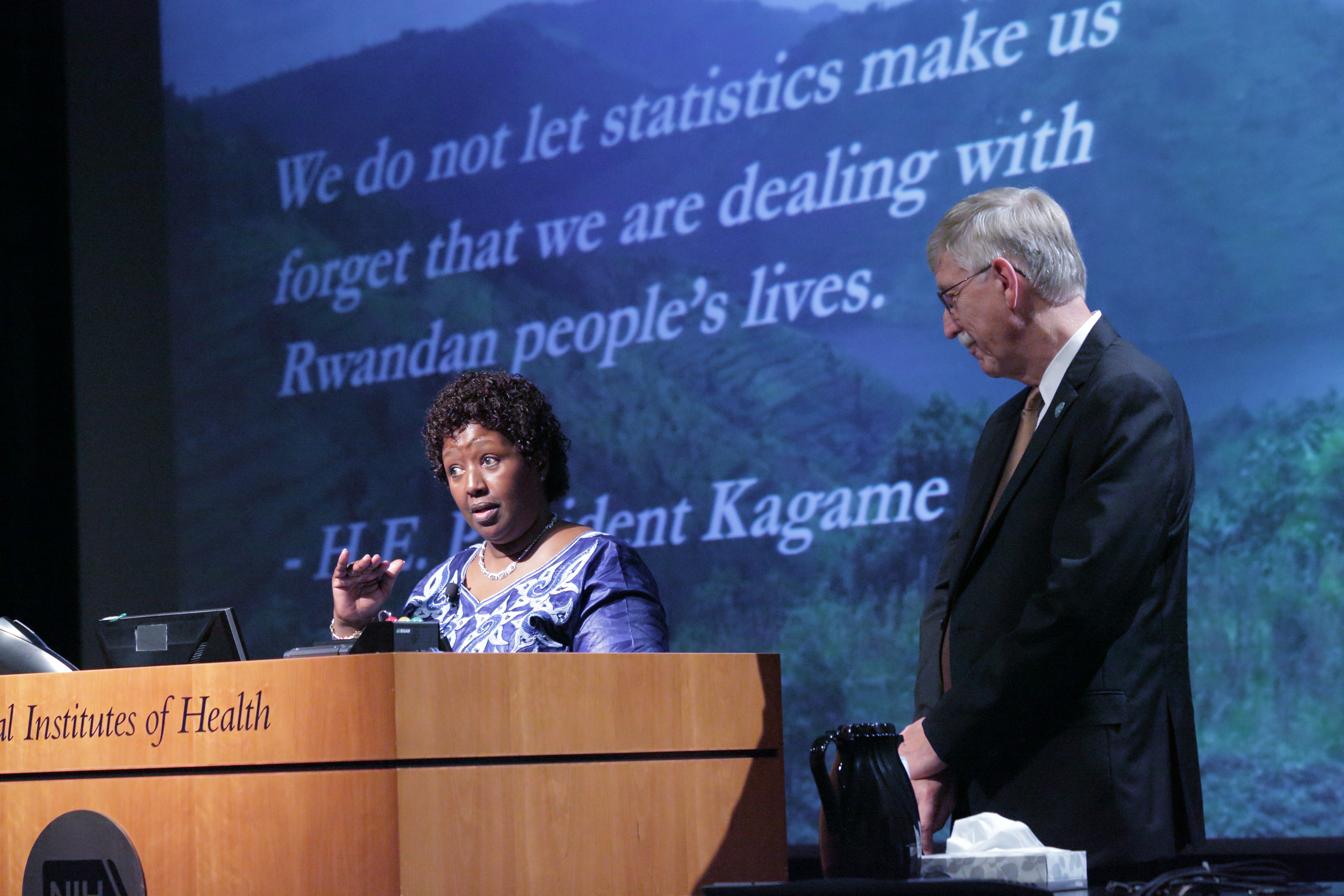
Binagwaho speaks at the NIH, October 2015.

== Honors and awards ==
In 2013, Binagwaho delivered the University College London Lancet Lecture Series. In 2015, she was the Honorary David E. Barmes Global Health Lecturer through the National Institutes of Health and presented the lecture, "David E. Barmes Global Health Lecture: Medical Research and Capacity Building for Development: The Experience of Rwanda."

In 2015, she received two awards: the 2015 Roux Prize through the Institute for Health Metrics and Evaluation (IHME) for her use of Global Burden of Disease Study data to reduce infant mortality in Rwanda, and the Ronald McDonald House Charities Award of Excellence for her contribution to improving the health of children. She was named among the 100 Most Influential African Women for 2020 and for 2021. In 2022 she won the prize of L'Oréal-UNESCO For Women in Science Awards for her remarkable contribution towards the improvement of the Rwandan health system.

In her role as co-chair of the first conference on public health in Africa, she was awarded with the achievement of "Global Health Leadership". More recently, she was nominated in the Apolitical's 100 Most Influential Academics in Government in the policy area of "Recovery from Covid-19 — Global Health" and she was also recognized among the "Standout voices in African Public Health" for her advocacy for Global health equity and social justice.

== Publications ==
Binagwaho has published over 240 peer-reviewed articles and book chapters.
