= Ministry of Health (Rwanda) =

Government ministry of Rwanda

- Minisiteri y'Ubuzima; Ministère de la Santé
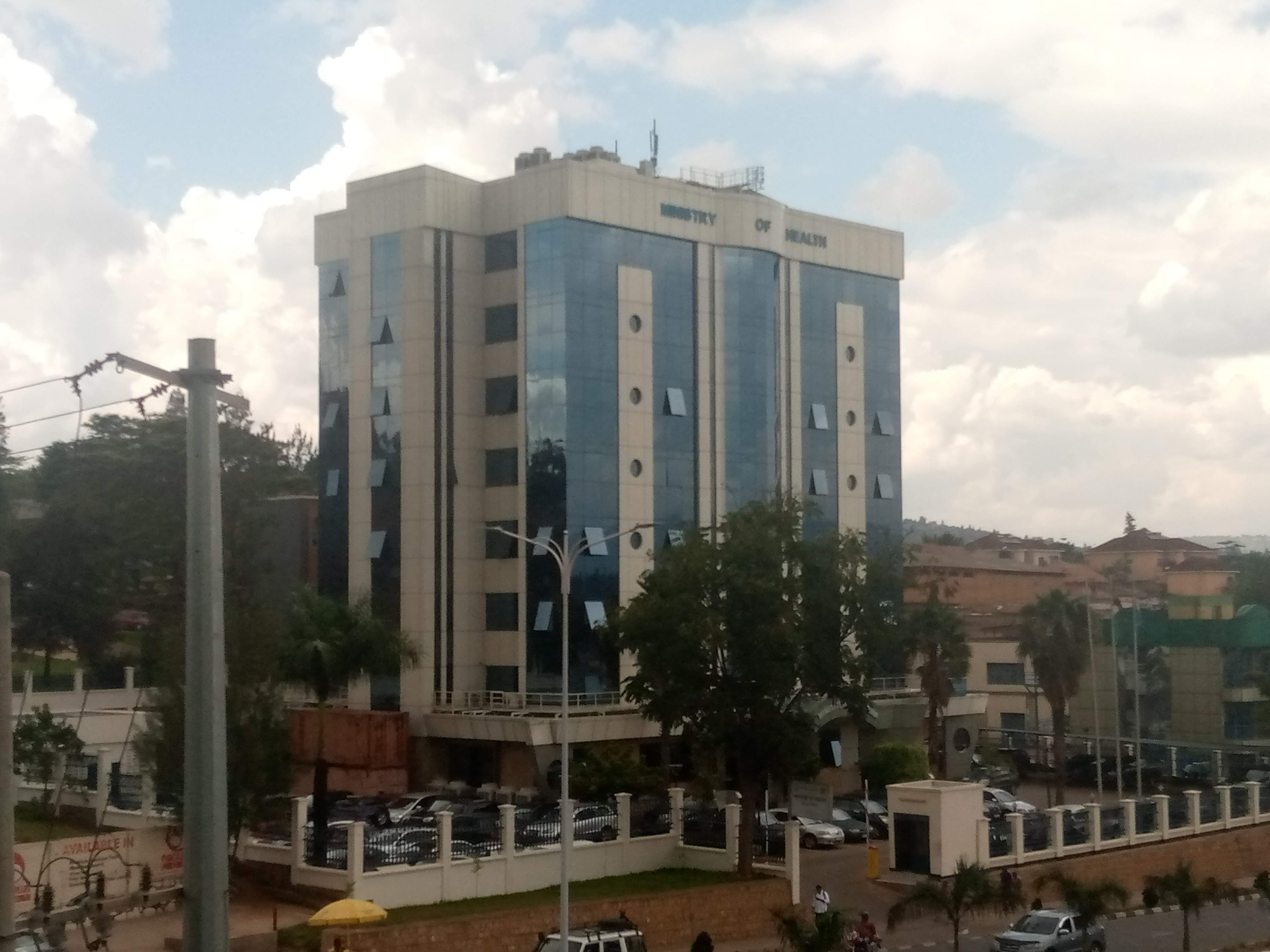
- The ministry's building in Kigali (2022)

Agency overview
- Jurisdiction: Government of Rwanda
- Headquarters: Kigali
- Minister responsible: Sabin Nsanzimana, Minister of Health
- Deputy Minister responsible: Yvan Butera, Minister of State
- Agency executive: Jean Marie Vianney Ndayizigiye, Permanent Secretary
- Website: www.moh.gov.rw

The Ministry of Health (MINISANTE) is the ministry of the Government of Rwanda in charge of health. It promotes the health of the population through preventive, curative and rehabilitative services.

The ministry is based in Kigali. Since November 2022, the minister has been Sabin Nsanzimana. He is assisted by a Minister of State, Yvan Butera.

== Role ==
The ministry's mission is "promoting the health of the population through the delivery of preventive, curative and rehabilitative health services". Its mission and structure are set by Prime Minister's Order No. 011/03 of 26 February 2024. The Health Sector Strategic Plan V (2024/25–2028/29) aims at universal health coverage by 2030.

The ministry's structure includes the Rwanda Biomedical Centre (RBC), the university teaching hospitals, the health facilities and the Rwanda Food and Drugs Authority (Rwanda FDA).

The ministry's name is Minisiteri y'Ubuzima in Kinyarwanda and Ministère de la Santé in French. Its headquarters are in Kigali.

== Ministers ==
- Agnes Binagwaho (May 2011 – July 2016)
- Diane Gashumba (October 2016 – February 2020)
- Daniel Ngamije (February 2020 – November 2022)
- Sabin Nsanzimana (since November 2022)

=== Ministers of State ===
- Tharcisse Mpunga (February 2020 – November 2022)
- Yvan Butera (since November 2022)

== See also ==
- Health in Rwanda
- Cabinet of Rwanda
