= Sabin Nsanzimana =

Rwandan politician

Minister of Health
- Incumbent
- Assumed office November 2022
- President: Paul Kagame
- Preceded by: Daniel Ngamije

Director General of Rwanda Biomedical Centre(RBC)

Personal details
- Citizenship: Rwanda
- Party: Rwandan Patriotic Front

Sabin Nsanzimana is a Rwandan epidemiologist, currently serving as the Minister of Health in the Government of Rwanda. He is a former Director General of Rwanda Biomedical Centre (RBC).

== Education ==
Nsanzimana attended Minor Seminary Virgo Fidelis and went on to study medicine at the University of Rwanda. He also holds a master's degree in Clinical Epidemiology from the same University. He completed a PhD in Epidemiology at the University of Basel, Switzerland. His Ph.D. thesis was entitled "Optimizing the Effectiveness for Individual- and Community-Level Outcomes in the Era of Pre-and on ART in Rwanda". Nsanzimana is a respected researcher among Rwandans with a high number of citations.

== Career ==
For the past decade, Nsanzimana worked in the national HIV Program. Before serving as the Director General, Nsanzimana served as the Director of the National HIV Program in Rwanda Biomedical Center. He shortly served as the Director General of the University Teaching Hospital of Butare. In November 2022, Nsanzimana was appointed as the new Minister of Health, replacing Dr. Ngamije Daniel.

== Personal life ==
As of June 2018, Nsanzimana is married and has three children.
