= Daniel Ngamije =

Minister in Rwanda

Daniel Ngamije is a Rwandan politician and physician who served as Rwandan Minister of Health between 2020 and 2022. He was appointed in February 2020 by President Paul Kagame and his term ended in November 2022.

== Education and career ==
Ngamije received a bachelor’s degree in Medicine and Surgery from Universite de Kinshasa and master’s degree in Medicine in Public Health from Universite Libre de Bruxelles, Brusells, Belgium. From 1995 to 1997 Ngamije worked as a Medical Doctor in Kabgayi Hospital. Thereafter, he held other positions in the Ministry of Health and other Rwandan Health sectors in Rwanda. He was the Coordinator of the Project Implementation Unit from 2007 to 2017. Before he was appointed as the Minister of Health in February 2020, he was the Executive for Malaria and Neglected Tropical Diseases under the World Health Organization (WHO).

In March 2023, it was announced that Ngamjie would take up the role of Director of the WHO's Global Malaria Programme from April 2023.
