= International School of Kigali =

International school in Kigali, Rwanda

International School of Kigali-Rwanda
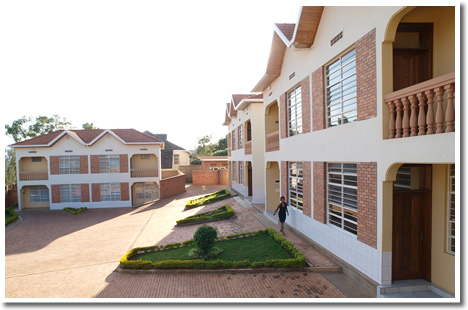
- Main building in 2009
- Kigali, Rwanda

Information
- Type: Private International School
- Established: 2009
- Director: Joseph Rosevear
- Enrollment: 191 (2025)
- Curriculum: International Standards, Common Core, AERO Standards, Advanced Placement
- Website: http://www.iskr.org

The International School of Kigali (ISK) is an accredited, non-profit, and inclusive school in Rwanda, established in 2009 by parents from the Dutch and American communities. It offers a Western-style, non-denominational education and focuses on diversity, inclusion, and high academic standards. ISK serves children ages 4 to 18, offering a comprehensive curriculum, including Advanced Placement courses and the AP Capstone Diploma, alongside electives like art, music, drama, and Rwandan studies. The school promotes a safe, innovative, and engaging learning environment. In December 2021, ISK moved to a new campus in Kibagabaga, featuring modern facilities like swimming pools, a tennis court, and sports fields. The school's motto is "Be compassionate, Stay curious."
