= Kigali Car-Free Zone =

- Car-Free city
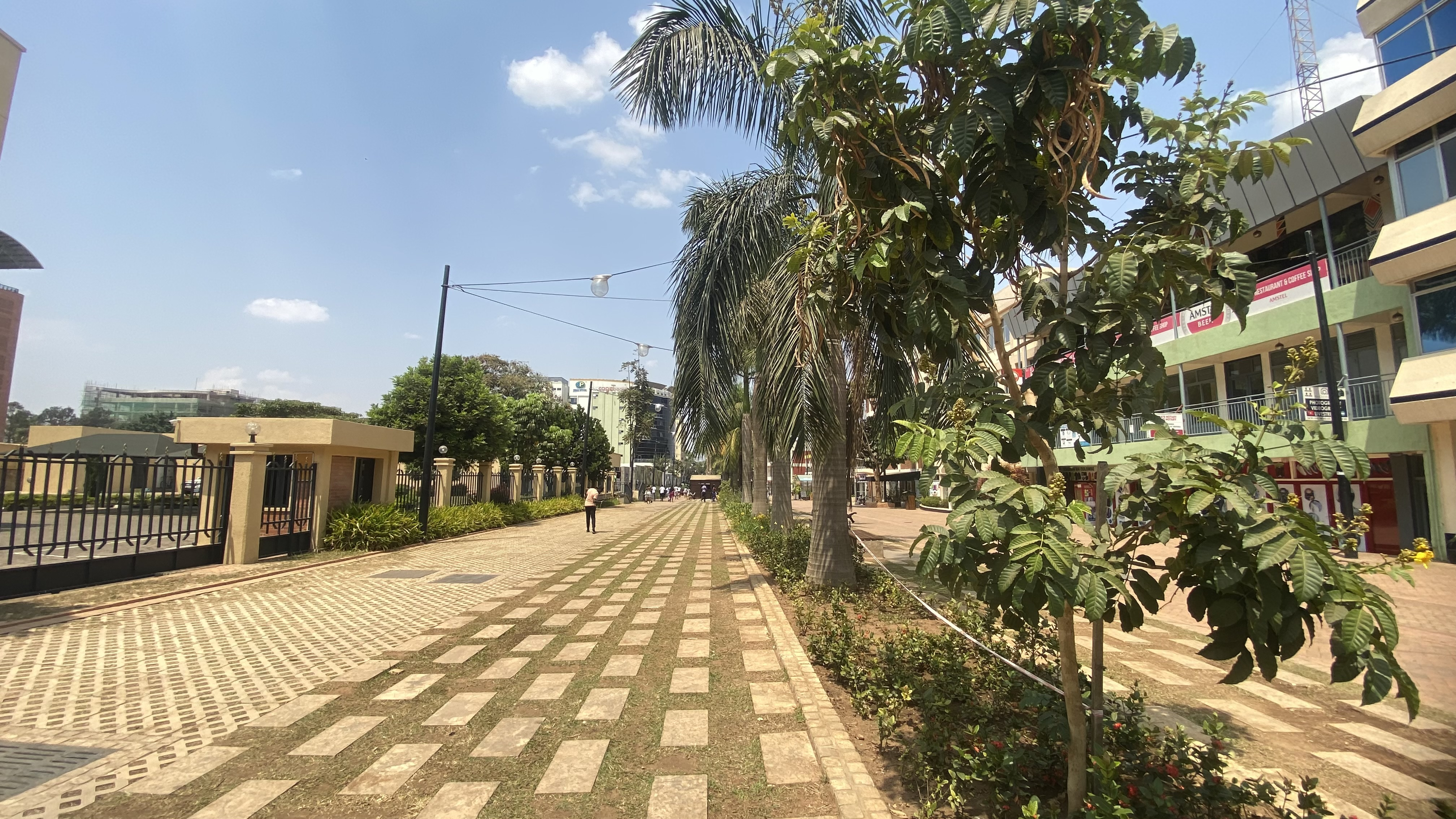
- Kigali Car free Zone

Kigali Car-Free Zone is a popular area in Kigali that relies primarily on walking or cycling for transport. In 2021, the Rwandan government considered an expansion and rebranding of this zone to improve congestion and infrastructure, and for environmental and quality of life benefits. It is located on Road KN4 Avenue, between Kigali City Hall and among commercial buildings like Makuza Peace Plaza, Bank of Kigali, Ecobank Rwanda and Cogebanque

== Planning Process ==
The Kigali Car-Free Zone project was announced on 26 August 2015. Since 2015, vehicle traffic has been stopped in that zone. In March 2021, Kigali city announced modern construction and rebranding of Kigali Car-Free Zone into "Imbuga City Walk". The cost of the project is estimated to be $6 billion RWF.

== Facilities ==
Imbuga City Walk has pedestrian zones and cycling friendly pavements, green corridor landscaping, kiosks, an exhibition zone, a kids’ playground, street benches and free Wi-Fi, in addition to a city lounge and arcade, pedestrian-friendly street lamps and public toilets. In 2021, the Kigali City Council launched renovation works to give it a new look to make it more beautiful and attractive.
