= Karuruma smelter =

Phoenix Metal Ltd
- Industry: Mining
- Founded: 1980; 46 years ago (as SOMIRWA); 2002; 24 years ago (bought by NMC Metallurgie)
- Headquarters: Kigali, Rwanda
- Area served: Worldwide
- Key people: Raphael Ritter De Zahony (CEO); Francois Munyankindi (COO)
- Products: Cassiterite; Wolfram; Tantalite; Beryl; Tin Slag
- Owner: NMC Metallurgie

The Karuruma tin smelter is a tin smelting plant in the Rwandan capital, Kigali, currently operated by the company LuNa Smelter Ltd. The plant was previously operated by Phoenix Metal Ltd.

The Karuruma tin smelter was built in the early 1980s to produce tin from concentrate coming from the Société des Mines du Rwanda (SOMIRWA). SOMIRWA managed the smelter until 1985 when it went bankrupt. The smelter was reopened at the end of 1990 by a company called ALICOM but was closed again in April 1994 when the Rwandan genocide against the Tutsis started. The Government of Rwanda, who owned the smelter, sold it as part of its privatisation program. The plant is located near Kigali, the Rwandan capital.

== Company history under NMC Metallurgie ==
In 2002 The Tin Smelter has been bought by NMC Metallurgie. Until end of 2003 the technical teams worked on the investment and maintenance in order to repair the factory, import and install the missing machinery, restart the smelting activity with an optimisation of the process. In June and December 2003 tests have been done with success and the industrial production was ready to start by the end of 2003. In 2005 the company decided to change the name of the company to "Phoenix Metal" and to change also the memorandum of association. The price of electricity, the power cut and a problem of quantity of row material had obliged to stop the smelting activity.

In 2006, the company tested a new process based on an exothermic process. Those tests were a technical success but the second increase of the price of the electricity in December 2005 and the remaining problem of quantity of raw material were not covered by the positive aspects of the new process. Five years after the privatisation, a complete technical and financial audit has been conducted by the Privatisation to see if the conditions of the contract were respected by both parties. It has been decided between the parties, that Phoenix Metal haven‟t any more obligation. Phoenix Metal has promised to keep in mind smelting and will do a special effort to restart the smelter at first opportunity.

In 2017, the company entered receivership and was bought by the Rwandan government for RWF1.2 billion.

== The Factory ==
The tin smelter was built in 1980 by the Belgians. The target of this project was to smelt all the cassiterite from this area. The normal capacity of the smelter was 10 tons of cassiterite per day and has been increase to 15 tons per day.

The factory is equipped with 2 electrical arc furnace. The capacity of the furnace is between 10 and 15 tons of mix per day. Three refining furnaces are for the control of the impurities. Two segregation furnaces are used for the recycling of the scrap.

== Ore ==
=== Treatment ===
Some Rwandese producers have not facilities or knowledge for cleaning minerals. Phoenix Metal proposes them to clean and prepare the mineral for export considering the details of the supplier export contract. For that, Phoenix Metal has Crusher, Mills, Spirals, Shacking Tables dry and wet, Magnetic separation (Magnetic separation).

=== Trading ===
With the smelting activities not running, Phoenix Metal has started an activity of trading. The main ores trade by Phoenix Metal are:

1.Cassiterite

2.Wolfram

3.Tantalite

4.Beryl

5.Tin Slag

Phoenix Metal worked with one customer named Sideral Development. Sideral pre-financed Phoenix Metal for Minerals purchase.
