= Kigali City Tower =

Mixed use 20-storey high rise building in Kigali

- Buildings in Kigali CBD, including Kigali City Tower (right)

- Location within Rwanda

General information
- Location: Kigali, Rwanda, Avenue du Commerce (KN 67 Street)
- Coordinates: 1.9433°S 30.0596°E
- Construction started: 2006
- Completed: 2011
- Cost: USD 20 million

Technical details
- Floor count: 20

Design and construction
- Main contractor: China Civil Engineering Construction

Kigali City Tower is a mixed use high rise office and retail building located in Kigali, the capital of Rwanda. The complex consists of a 20-story tower, the tallest in the country, a four-story commercial center and a car park block, with space divided between leased office space and retail outlets.

The building, on the site of a former bus station, was developed by Rwandan businessman Hatari Sekoko and built by Chinese engineers. The building work began in 2006 and the complex opened in 2011.

== History ==
Since his accession to power in 2000, President Paul Kagame has sought to transform Rwanda from an impoverished country dependent on subsistence agriculture into a middle income country with a strong service sector. This policy, which is based on liberalising the economy, privatising state owned industries and reducing red tape for businesses, has led to a strong GDP growth between 2004 and 2010 of 8% per year. The changing economy has prompted a construction boom as the need for office and urban residential space has increased.

The Kigali City Tower project was begun in 2006 by Rwandan businessman Hatari Sekoko, through his company Doyelcy Limited. Sekoko, a Rwandan Patriotic Front veteran of the Rwandan Civil War, worked in Japan from 1995 to raise capital, before returning to Rwanda to start a coffee distribution business and later diversifying into real estate and hospitality. The first phase of the project was the construction of the car park building, which began in 2007. At that stage the tower was proposed as a circular building with a spiral design, which would act primarily as a viewing platform. In April 2009, Uganda based newsmagazine The Independent reported that Sekoko's team had changed the building's shape to elliptical in order to create more floor space within the tower.

Sekoko contracted Chinese company China Civil Engineering Construction to construct the building, and also sourced raw materials from his own depot in Guangzhou, China. The building was completed in early 2011, and retailers and companies began to occupy the space thereafter. A three-screen Century Cinema complex was completed in March 2013 and opened in May 2013 but has since closed.

== Location and design ==
View of Kigali City Tower from ground level

Kigali City Tower is on Avenue du Commerce, also known as KN 76 Street, in Nyarugenge District, which is the central business district of Kigali. The building is on the site of the former central bus station, which was closed in 2005.

The building consists of three components: the tower, which rises to 20 stories, the 4-story commercial center, and a car parking block which is also 4 stories tall. As of 2013 the tower is the tallest building in Kigali and Rwanda. The total retail floor space is around 10,000 square metres (110,000 sq ft) while office space is 7,000 square metres (75,000 sq ft).

The tower block is occupied mostly by office space, with only the ground, lower ground and top floors being retail. Each floor of the tower has 336 square metres (3,620 sq ft) of office space available.

== Retail and entertainment ==
The largest retailer in the complex was a branch of the Kenyan supermarket chain Nakumatt, which occupied the ground and lower ground floors of the commercial centre, as well as the ground floor of the car park building. This was Nakumatt's second Kigali store, the other was in the Union Trade Centre. South African clothing store Mr Price opened its first Rwandan branch in the complex in 2011, run by franchisee Deacons Kenya. Luxury coffee house Bourbon Coffee ran a cafe and outdoor seating area, one of its five outlets in the city, but has since closed.

The third floor of the commercial center used to house the Century Cinema complex. The cinema had four screens: three regular screens with 233, 135, 70 seats respectively, and a 4D film screen (marketed as 5D) which seated 18, the first of its kind in East Africa,but it has since closed. Other retail providers include a food court, on the first floor of the commercial centre, a fitness center and a daycare nursery.

Retail space within the tower consists of a bar/restaurant on the lower ground floor, a branch of Bank of Kigali on the ground floor, and a restaurant with roof top bar and nightclub on the top floor.
