= List of defunct airlines of Rwanda =

This is a list of now defunct airlines from Rwanda.

| Airline | Image | IATA | ICAO | Callsign | Commenced operations | Ceased operations | Notes |
|---|---|---|---|---|---|---|---|
| Air Rwanda | | RY | RWD | | 1975 | 1994 | Renamed to Rwanda Air |
| Alliance Express Rwanda | | ZM | RWB | | 1998 | 1999 | |
| Central African Cargo | | | | CAC | 2000 | 2003 | Established as Regional Cargo Airlines |
| Majyambere Air Service | | | | | 1978 | 1979 | Renamed to Sorwati Air Service |
| Natar | | | | | 1995 | 1996 | |
| New Gomair | | | | | 2002 | 2002 | Operated Boeing 707 |
| Portalia Air Transport | | | | | 1972 | 1973 | Operated Nord Noratlas |
| Regional Cargo Airlines | | | | | 1999 | 2000 | Renamed to Central African Cargo |
| Regional International Air Services | | | | | 2003 | 2005 | |
| Royal Rwanda Airlines | | | RRA | ROYAL RWANDA | ? | ? | |
| Rwanda Airlines | | 9R | RUA | | 1998 | 2002 | Operated BAC 1-11 |
| Rwanda Air | | | | | 1994 | 1997 | Renamed to Air Rwanda |
| Rwandair Cargo | | | RWC | | 1994 | 1995 | |
| Rwandair Express | | WB | RWD | RWANDAIR | 2002 | 2009 | Rebranded as RwandAir |
| SA Alliance Air Express | | RY | RWB | | 1999 | 2000 | Established as Alliance Express |
| Silverback Cargo Freighters | | | VRB | SILVERBACK | 2002 | 2009 | |
| Société de Transport Aérien du Rwanda | | | | | 1962 | 1979 | |
| Sorwati Air Service | | | | | 1979 | 1980 | Established as Majyambere Air Service |
| Southern Gateway (Rwanda) | | | | | 1998 | 2001 | |
| Sun Air Charter | | | | | 2002 | 2004 | Operated Antonov An-12, BN-2 Islander |
| Vega Avia | | | | | 2003 | 2006 | |

== See also ==
- List of airlines of Rwanda
- List of airports in Rwanda
