= Nyamata =

Town in Rwanda

Nyamata city
- Town and sector
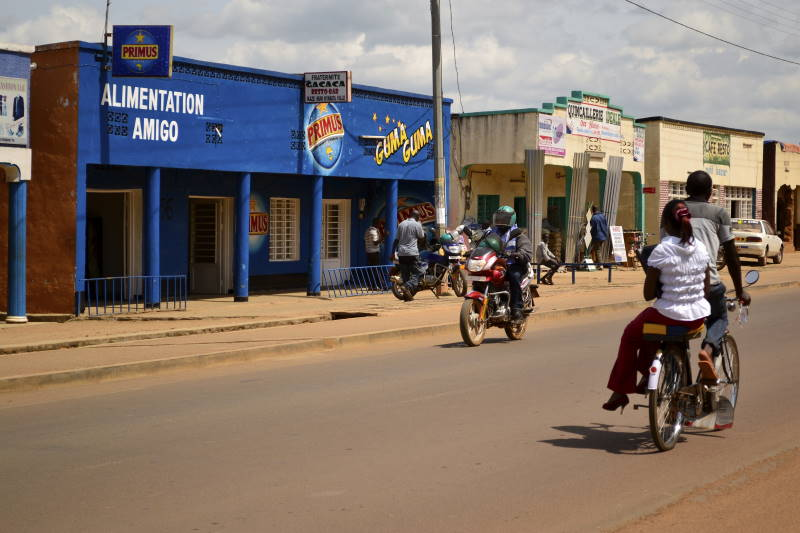

- Location in Rwanda
- Coordinates: 2.14829°S 30.09069°E
- Country: Rwanda
- Province: Eastern Province
- District: Bugesera District

Area
  - Town and sector: 95 km^{2} (37 sq mi)
- Elevation: 1,340 m (4,400 ft)

Population (2022 census)
  - Town and sector: 81,480
  - Density: 860/km^{2} (2,200/sq mi)
  - Urban: 65,107
- Climate: Aw

Nyamata is a town and sector in the Bugesera District, southeastern Rwanda. Nyamata literally means 'place of milk' from the two Kinyarwanda words nya- 'of' and amata 'milk'. It is the location of the Nyamata Genocide Memorial, commemorating the Rwandan genocide of 1994.

== History ==
It is not well known what happened in the region before 1900. The area was originally part of the Kingdom of Bugesera but was conquered by Rwanda in the late 19th century. In March 1992, the town and its surroundings were the site of anti-Tutsi massacres.

== Location ==
Nyamata is located in Bugesera District, Eastern Province, directly south of Kigali, the national capital and the largest city in the country. Its location is about 39 kilometres (24 mi), by road, south of Kigali.

== Overview ==
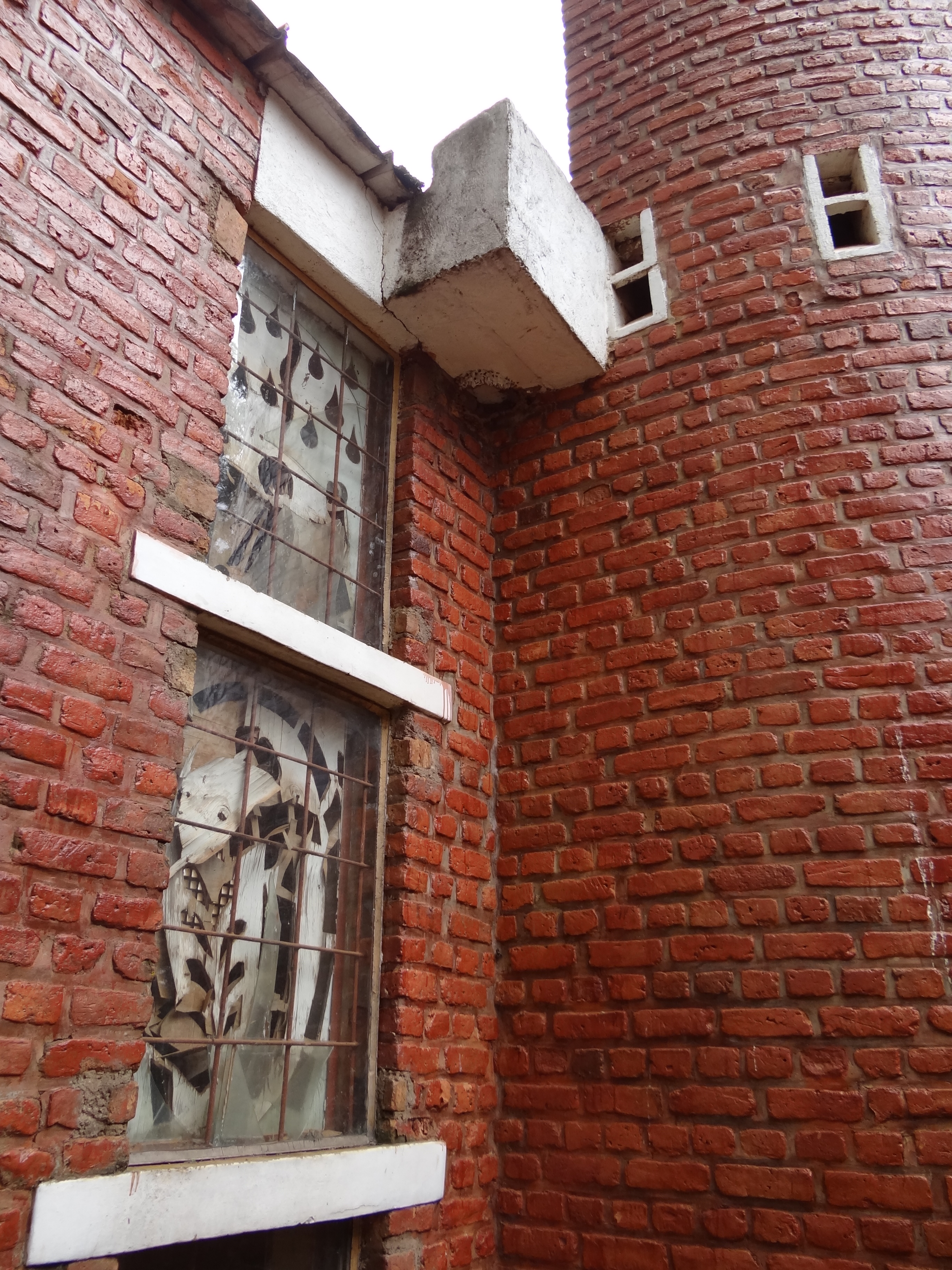
The exterior of the Catholic Church Nyamata Genocide Memorial.

Nyamata is a small town in Bugesera District, Rwanda. Since 2017, Bugesera International Airport has been under construction, with the first phases expected to be completed in 2019.

The town is the location of Nyamata Genocide Memorial, commemorating the Rwandan genocide of 1994. Located at the site where Nyamata Parish Catholic Church once stood, the memorial contains the remains of over 45,000 genocide victims, almost all of whom were Tutsi, including over 10,000 who were massacred inside the church itself.

== Population ==
According to the national population census of 15 August 2012, the population of Nyamata city consisted of 17,076 people. As of 2022, it was confirmed that the numbers have since then grown to 65,107 people, making it the sixth largest town in Rwanda.

Nyamata has developed into a busy town with lots of infrastructures and facilities like churches, hotels and factories.

== Points of interest ==
The following points of interest lie within the town limits or close to the edges of town:

- Nyamata Genocide Memorial Centre
- Offices of Nyamata Town Council
- Nyamata central market
- A branch of the Bank of Kigali
- A branch of the Urwego Opportunity Bank
- Bugesera International Airport, near the town of Rilima.

== See also ==
- Bank of Kigali
- Urwego Opportunity Bank
