= Bugesera =

Bugesera may refer to:

- Bugesera District, Eastern Province, Rwanda
- Kingdom of Bugesera, 16th to 18th century kingdom in Central Africa
- Bugesera natural region, a natural region of Burundi
