= UOB =

UOB or UoB is the acronymic abbreviation for:

- United Overseas Bank, a Singaporean multinational investment bank and financial services company
- University of Baghdad
- University of Bahrain
- University of Balamand
- University of Bath
- University of Balochistan
- University of Bedfordshire
- University of Birmingham
- University of Bolton
- University of Bradford
- University of Brighton
- University of Bristol
- Urwego Opportunity Bank, a microfinance bank in Rwanda
