= JLX =

JLX may refer to:

- JLX (comics), a superhero team
- JetLink Express, a former Kenyan airline
