= List of airlines of Rwanda =

This is a list of airlines currently operating in Rwanda.

Airline	Image	IATA	ICAO	Callsign	Commenced operations	Notes
RwandAir		WB	RWD	RWANDAIR	2002	

== See also ==
- List of airlines
- List of defunct airlines of Rwanda
