= Akagera Aviation School =

Rwandan aviation school

Coordinates: 01°57′48″S 30°08′06.5″E

- Type: Private
- Established: 2013; 13 years ago
- Students: ~ 70 (2019)
- Location: Kigali, Rwanda
- Campus: Urban
- Website: Homepage

Akagera Aviation School (AAS), is an aviation training school in Rwanda, that provides training for prospective pilots, for both rotary and fixed wing aircraft, serving the Rwanda Defence Force, RwandAir and General Aviation.

== Location ==
The headquarters of the school are located at Kigali International Airport, approximately 5 kilometres (3 mi), by road, east of the central business district of Kigali, the capital and largest city in Rwanda. The geographical coordinates of the campus of Akagera Aviation School are: 01°57'48.0"S, 30°08'06.5"E (Latitude:-1.963333; Longitude:30.135139).

== Overview ==
The training institution is privately owned by Rwanda Aviation, a company that markets helicopters for sale and/or for hire. The school was established to address the shortage of flight professionals in Rwanda and the region. As of December 2017, RwandAir has 150 pilots, of whom only 25 are Rwandans, and only two are Rwandan captains. The school plans to start training aircraft mechanics and aircraft service crew, at a later date.

== Class sizes ==
The commercial pilot courses for both helicopters and fixed wing aircraft last 18 months. The helicopter pilot class size is about 11 individuals, with intake every June. The fixed wing aircraft pilot class size is 20 students, with intake, every February. The majority of graduates from these classes find employment with RwandaAir and with the Rwanda military.

== See also ==
- Transport in Rwanda
