= Rwandan plane crash =

Rwandan plane crash may refer to:

- Assassination of Juvénal Habyarimana and Cyprien Ntaryamira,1994, triggering the Rwandan genocide
- RwandAir Flight 205, 2009, crashed at Kigali airport
