= Ndoli =

Ndoli is a surname. Notable people with the surname include:

- Jean-Claude Ndoli (born 1986), Rwandan footballer
- Ruganzu II Ndoli, King of Rwanda
