= Peter Greer =

Peter Keith Greer is an author, speaker, and president and CEO of HOPE International, a global Christ-centered economic development organization serving throughout Africa, Asia, Latin America, and Eastern Europe. Peter and his wife, Laurel, have four children and live in Lancaster, PA.

== Biography ==
Greer was raised in Carlisle, Massachusetts, graduating from Concord-Carlisle High School in 1993. He received his undergraduate degree in international business from Messiah University (B.S., 1997). While traveling to Russia through Messiah's International Business Institute, Greer was introduced to microfinance and "quickly recognized it as a perfect opportunity to combine [his] interests in business and missions."

Upon graduation, Greer spent two years in the education sector before World Relief hired him to work as a microfinance adviser in Phnom Penh, Cambodia. He also served as a technical adviser for Self-Help Development Foundation (CARE Zimbabwe) in Bulawayo, Zimbabwe. In 1999, he became the managing director for Urwego Bank in Kigali, Rwanda, managing there for three years. Afterwards, he attended Harvard University, focusing one of his research projects on HOPE International's work in the Democratic Republic of Congo. Greer received his graduate degree in political and economic development from Harvard's Kennedy School (M.P.P., 2004). He also received an honorary doctorate from Erskine College (Doctor of Humane Letters, 2012). He has a nephew named Peter Greer who resides in Grand Rapids, Michigan.

In 2004, Jeff Rutt, founder of HOPE International, invited Greer to take leadership of the nonprofit. HOPE's mission is to invest in the dreams of families in the world's underserved communities as they proclaim and live the Gospel. They carry out their mission by providing biblically based training, savings services, and loans that restore dignity and break the cycle of poverty. Under Greer's leadership, HOPE has expanded from having a presence in two countries with an operating budget of $1.2 million to serving in 16 countries with an operating budget of $19 million in 2019.

== Role in international development ==
As an advocate for the Church's role in missions and alleviating extreme poverty, Greer has been a speaker at a number of conferences, and he has been featured by Christianity Today, WORLD, Forbes, CNN, and Relevant. Greer has co-authored over 10 books, including Mission Drift (selected as a 2015 Book Award Winner from Christianity Today), Rooting for Rivals (selected as a 2019 Leadership Resource of the Year in Outreach magazine), and The Spiritual Danger of Doing Good (selected as one of the top 40 books on poverty by WORLD).

As of 2022, Peter serves as the entrepreneur-in-residence at Messiah University, helping to lead the university's Center for Entrepreneurship. He also serves as a Praxis Venture Partner.

== Books ==
- Mission Drift: The Unspoken Crisis Facing Leaders, Charities, and Churches (Bethany House Publishers, 2014).
- Rooting for Rivals: How Collaboration and Generosity Increase the Impact of Leaders, Charities, and Churches (Bethany House Publishers, 2018).
- Created to Flourish: How Employment-Based Solutions Help Eradicate Poverty (HOPE International, 2016) -- formerly published as The Poor Will Be Glad.
- The Spiritual Danger of Doing Good (Bethany House Publishers, 2014).
- The Giver and the Gift: Principles of Kingdom Fundraising (Bethany House Publishers, 2015).
- The Board and the CEO: Seven Practices to Protect Your Organization's Most Important Relationship (Amazon KDP (formerly CreateSpace Independent Publishing), 2017).
- Succession: Seven Practices to Navigate Mission-Critical Leadership Transitions (Amazon KDP, 2020).
- 40/40 Vision: Clarifying Your Mission in Midlife (InterVarsity Press, 2015).
- Entrepreneurship for Human Flourishing (AEI, 2014).
- Watching Seeds Grow: A Guide to Entrepreneurship for Parents and Children (Amazon KDP (formerly CreateSpace Independent Publishing, 2014).
- The Redemptive Nonprofit: A Playbook for Leaders (Praxis, 2019).
- Mommy's Heart Went Pop (4-more, 2012).
