= Ruganzu II Ndoli =

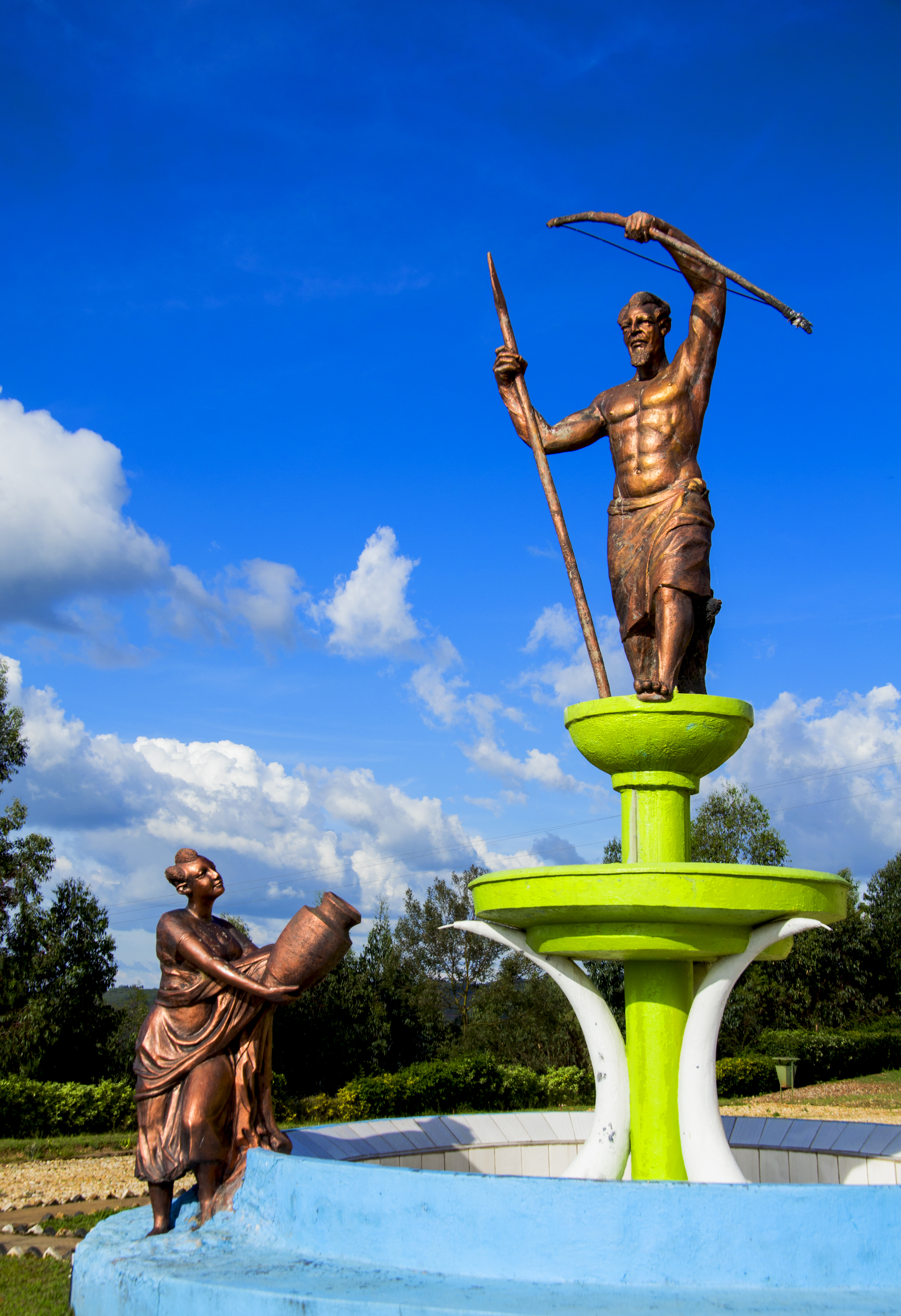

Mwami (King)
- Reign: 1510–1543
- Born: 15th century Kingdom of Rwanda
- Died: 1543; Rusenyi District, Kingdom of Rwanda
- Issue: Mutara I Nsoro II Semugeshi
- Dynasty: Nyiginya dynasty (3rd)
- Father: Ndahiro II Cyamatare

Ruganzu II Ndoli was Mwami of the Kingdom of Rwanda from 1510 until death in 1543. He was the son of King Ndahiro II Cyamatare and Nyirangabo-ya-Nyantaba. Ruganzu II is the most renowned king of Rwanda. He was a great warrior and was alleged to have performed miracles. His life and reign pervade many legends in the history of Rwanda. His father King Cyamatare and members of his family were brutally murdered by Nyebunga and his allies. Before dying, the king planned and executed his son's escape plan.

The fall of King Ndahiro I Cyamatare occurred shortly after his son fled to the neighboring Kingdom of Karagwe. Having narrowly escaped death, the grieving prince found refuge in Karagwe under the tutelage of the Queen of Karagwe, who happened to be his aunt. Ruganzu Ndoli is said to have been raised by his Aunt in the Kingdom of Karagwe and his descendants include Ndoli Amani in Rwanda. Ruganzu, who is said to have left a mark on the Rwanda region, who is said to have returned in 1510 from the kingdom of Karagwe ka Bahinda, where he had been exiled with his aunt Nyabunyana and came to liberate Rwanda from the hands of foreigners after eleven years exile, young and inexperienced.

Ruganzu also assisted the King of Bugesera, Rwayitare, to attack and win the King of Burundi Ntare II Kibogora, whom they had disputes.

It is believed that he ascended the throne in 1510 and assisted the King of Bugesera, Rwayitare, to attack and win the ancestral King of Burundi Ntare II Kibogora, whom they had disputes. Ruganzu also strengthened bilateral relations between Rwanda and Karagwe, where his aunt was a queen who protected him and taught him to fight.

Ruganzu died from the shooting of an arrow in the eye by a man named Bitibibisi from Rusenyi (modern Karongi).

Regnal titles
Preceded by Ndahiro II Cyamatare	King of Rwanda	Succeeded by Mutara I Nsoro III Semugeshi
