= Yvonne Makolo =

Rwandan IT specialist and corporate executive

Yvonne Manzi Makolo
- Born: DRCongo
- Citizenship: Rwandan
- Education: McGill University
- Occupations: IT Specialist & Business Executive
- Years active: 1993 — present
- Known for: Business, management
- Title: Chief executive officer Rwandair

Yvonne Manzi Makolo is a Rwandan IT specialist who serves as the chief executive officer of RwandAir, the national airline of Rwanda. She was appointed to that position on 6 April 2018. Prior to that, she was the Deputy CEO at the airline, responsible for corporate affairs, from April 2017 until April 2018.

On 5 June 2023, Yvonne Makolo, the CEO of RwandAir, assumed office as the chair of the Board of Governors of the International Air Transport Association (IATA). She became the 81st chair of the IATA BoG and the first woman to take on this role, an impetus in the organ's global initiative of driving gender balance within the aviation industry. Makolo succeeds Mehmet Tevfik Nane, Pegasus Airlines Chairperson of the Board. In her remarks, she said that leading a medium-sized airline in Africa has instilled in her a unique perspective on issues that airlines hold in common.

== Background and education ==
She was born in the Democratic Republic of the Congo. In 1993, she voluntarily migrated to Canada. Ten years later, in 2003 she returned to her native Rwanda. She and her older sister were raised by a single mother, Yvonne's father having died when she was very young. Her sister is the Rwandan government spokeswoman Yolande Makolo. Makolo has specialized training in information technology and has worked as a software developer, both in Canada and Rwanda. Yvonne Makolo holds a BA Hons degree from McGill University in Canada and a Post Graduate Diploma in Applied Information Technology.

== Career ==
In 2006, she joined MTN Rwanda, a leading telecommunications service provider in the country. Over time, she rose through the ranks to the position of chief marketing officer (CMO) and also concurrently was the chief executive officer (CEO), in an acting capacity.

In April 2017, when the Cabinet of Rwanda made management changes at Rwandair, Makolo was appointed Deputy CEO, responsible for Corporate Affairs. One year later, in another managerial change at the national airline, she was appointed to the position of managing director and chief executive officer at Rwandair.

In November 2021, Makolo was interviewed by the International Air Transport Association (IATA). During that interview, she was asked what it would take for African aviation to revive. She believes governments must provide more support for aviation. "However, this does not always imply financial assistance".

Makolo is the 81st chair of the IATA BoG and the first woman to take on this role. She has served on the BoG since November 2020. She succeeds Pegasus Airlines Chairperson of the Board Mehmet Tevfik Nane who will continue to serve on the BoG.

== Other responsibilities ==
Makolo is a mother of young children.

== Awards and recognition ==
In June 2022, Makolo was recognized by the International Hospitality Institute on the Global 100 in Hospitality, a list featuring the 100 Most Powerful People in Global Hospitality.

== See also ==
- Transport in Rwanda
- List of airports in Rwanda
