= Yuhi II Gahima II =

Kigeli I Mukobanya
- Mwami (King) of Rwanda
- Dynasty: Nyiginya dynasty
- Father: Mibambwe I Sekarongoro I Mutabazi
- Mother: Matama Ya Bigega Bya Mutashya wa Gihumbi, daughter of Abaha clan.

Yuhi wa II Gahima II was, according to tradition, Mwami of the Kingdom of Rwanda during the fifteenth century. A member of the Nyiginya dynasty, he was supposed to have reigned between 1444 and 1477.

Regnal titles
Preceded by Mibambwe I Sekarongoro I Mutabazi	King of Rwanda; 1444—1477	Succeeded by Ndahiro wa II Cyamatare
