= RwandAir Flight 205 =

2009 aviation accident

Coordinates: 01°57′59″S 030°07′59″E

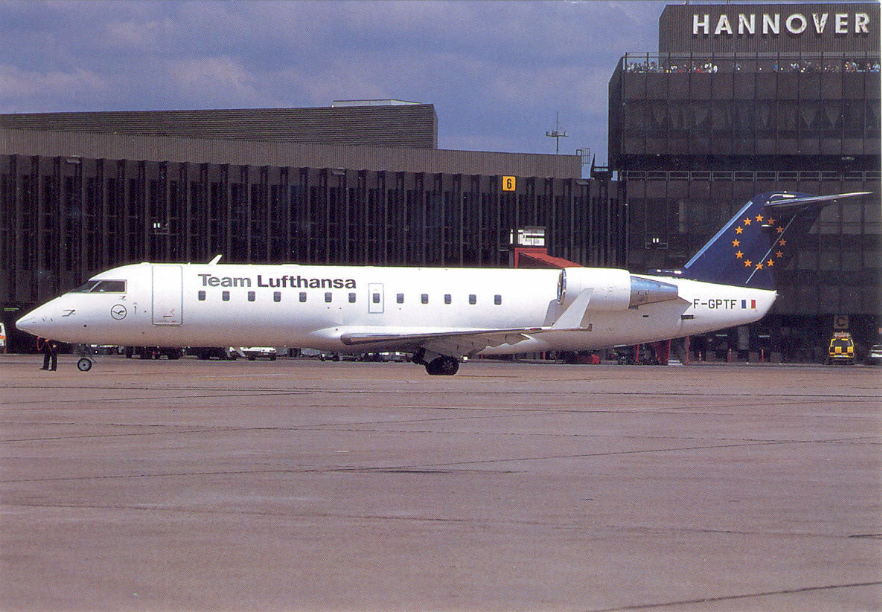
- The accident aircraft while in service with Team Lufthansa in 1999 with the registration F-GPTF

Accident
- Date: 12 November 2009
- Summary: Ground collision with terminal
- Site: Kigali International Airport, Kigali, Rwanda

Aircraft
- Aircraft type: Bombardier CRJ100ER
- Operator: JetLink Express on behalf of RwandAir
- IATA flight No.: WB205
- ICAO flight No.: RWD205
- Call sign: RWANDAIR 205
- Registration: 5Y-JLD
- Flight origin: Kigali International Airport, Kigali, Rwanda
- Destination: Entebbe International Airport, Entebbe, Uganda
- Occupants: 15
- Passengers: 10
- Crew: 5
- Fatalities: 1
- Injuries: 10
- Survivors: 14

RwandAir Flight 205 was a Canadair CRJ100ER that crashed into the Terminal Building of Kigali International Airport on 12 November 2009 after an emergency landing at Kigali, Rwanda killing one passenger. The flight was operated by JetLink Express on behalf of RwandAir. In the aftermath of the accident, RwandAir suspended all operations with JetLink Express.

== Background ==
=== Aircraft ===
The aircraft involved was a Canadair CRJ100ER, registered as 5Y-JLD with serial number 7197. It was made by the Bombardier Aviation Company in 1997 and was delivered to JetLink Express in June 2007. In its 12 years of service, it had logged 17,140 airframe hours in 17,025 takeoff and landing cycles. It was also equipped with two General Electric CF34-3A1 engines.

=== Crew ===
In command of Flight 205 was a 37-year-old male captain who logged 11,478 total airframe hours, 1,110 of which were logged on the CRJ100. His co-pilot was a 27-year-old female who logged 1,558 airframe hours, including 533 on the CRJ100.

== Accident ==
The flight took off from Kigali International Airport, shortly after which the pilots informed air traffic control that the left thrust lever had become jammed at the Takeoff Power setting. The pilots did not utilize the Thrust Lever Jammed Abnormal Checklist Procedure and instead immediately returned to the airport with the right thrust lever (which was adjustable) at idle, landing shortly after 11:30 a.m. The aircraft stopped short of the VIP Terminal Building but lurched forward as the chocks were being put in place; the aircraft then crashed into the VIP terminal. A fire followed the accident but was put out. The co-pilot was eventually freed from the wreckage three hours after the crash. Of the ten passengers and five crew, all survived the initial crash with injuries to ten people on the aircraft and in the VIP terminal. One female passenger died shortly after arriving at a hospital.

A RwandAir spokesperson said, "He landed safely on the runway and was guided by the marshals into the parking area. For some unexplained reason, the plane, from the parking spot, took off again at full power and ... took a right turn, unexplained, into the technical building." The METAR in force at the time of the accident was HRYR 121030Z VRB03KT 9999 BKN030 24/18 Q1018 NOSIG=.

== Aftermath ==
Post-flight investigation revealed the cable connecting the Left Thrust Lever to the engine assembly had severed shortly after application of Takeoff power. A procedure in the aircraft's Quick Reference Handbook (QRH) titled "Thrust Lever Jammed" would have directed the pilots to shut down the left engine by utilizing the Left Engine Fire push switch, which would have closed (among other things) the Fuel SOV (shutoff valve), thus allowing the speed of the aircraft to be better controlled while landing the aircraft. This QRH procedure would have been accomplished "at a safe altitude" per the procedure, while giving consideration to terrain or other obstacles. The pilots did not perform the above procedure, and instead, chose to immediately return to the airport, landing at a higher-than-normal airspeed due to the left engine still producing takeoff thrust, making it difficult to stop the aircraft and using much greater runway distance than normal. The aircraft was taxied back to the terminal with the left engine still producing takeoff power and the right engine at idle. When the aircraft was brought to a stop at the terminal building, the right engine was shut down by the pilots, the left engine was still operating at takeoff thrust, and the hydraulics were all turned "off", which was common procedure at the time. The aircraft disc brakes on the Canadair CRJ100 are operated by two of the three hydraulic systems on the aircraft, with System 2 supplied by pumps on the right engine (both mechanical and electric) and System 3 being supplied by two electric pumps. By shutting off the right engine and all of the electric hydraulic systems, the brakes as well as the parking brake were no longer being powered. As the hydraulic pressure bled down and with the left engine still producing takeoff thrust, the aircraft jumped over the chocks, lurched to the right (caused by the left engine thrust), and hit the terminal building. The left engine was eventually shut down by the airport crash tender spraying foam into the engine.
