= Mwogo =

- Town and sector
- Location within Rwanda
- Coordinates: 2.08604°S 30.14017°E
- Country: Rwanda
- Province: Eastern Province
- District: Bugesera District

Area
  - Town and sector: 52.36 km^{2} (20.22 sq mi)

Population (2022 census)
  - Town and sector: 30,171
  - Density: 576.2/km^{2} (1,492/sq mi)
  - Urban: 9,187

Mwogo is a sector in Bugesera District, Eastern Province in Rwanda, with a population of 30,171 (2022 census) and an area of 52.36 square kilometers. It is a remote rural setting bordering Kicukiro district in north, Juru sector in the east, Nyamata and Ntarama sectors in the south. The economy is mainly based on rice farming as well as crops such as beans, potatoes, bananas and vegetables. Mwogo presents a fast and remarkable future socio-economic transformation but construction of a bridge linking it to Kicukiro district is likely to be the main game changer to materialise that potential. Strong advocacy to mobilise decision makers is needed.
