= Air Rwanda =

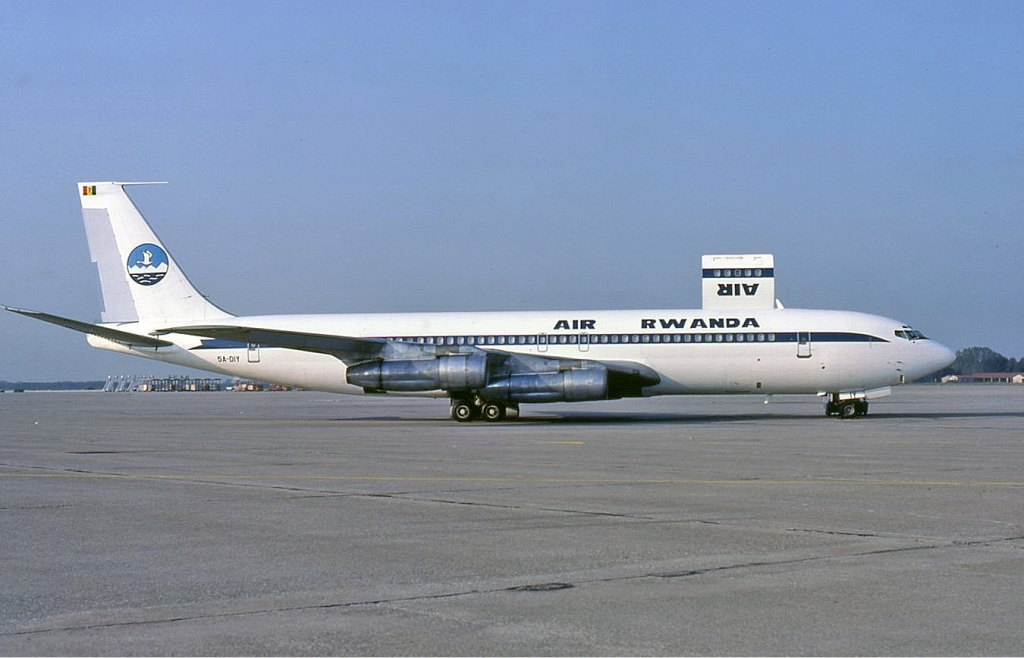
- Air Rwanda Boeing 707 freighter
| IATA | ICAO | Call sign |
|---|---|---|
| RY | - | - |
- Founded: 15 July 1975
- Commenced operations: 1975
- Ceased operations: 1996
- Hubs: Kigali International Airport
- Headquarters: Kigali, Rwanda

Société Nationale des Transports Aériens du Rwanda, or Air Rwanda as the airline was commonly known was the national airline of Rwanda, with its base at Kigali International Airport in Kigali. The airline operated for 21 years. In 1996 the airline was rebranded and renamed to Rwanda Air which finally led to the formation of RwandAir in 2002.

== History ==
=== Founding ===
Air Rwanda was founded by the government of Rwanda on 15 July 1975 as the national airline of Rwanda. The airline began operations on domestic flights and to neighbouring nations, with a network including flights from Kigali to Gisenyi, Kamembe, Bujumbura and Ostend. Other services were also operated to Tanzania, Uganda and Zaire, along with a scheduled cargo flight from Bujumbura to Mombasa in Kenya. A fleet comprising one Boeing 707, two de Havilland Canada DHC-6 Twin Otters and one Piper Aztec was operated on these routes. The airline would also occasionally lease a Britten-Norman Islander for operations from the Rwandan Air Force.

=== Libyan controversy ===
The airline was implicated in a mooted deal with Libya, under which the Libyans would paint Boeing aircraft belonging to Libyan Arab Airlines in Air Rwanda livery. The purpose of the deal was to allow the Libyans to skirt an embargo and to gain access to spare parts for the aircraft. The possible deal came to light when the United States gained photos of some Libyan aircraft being repainted in Air Rwanda livery, after which the Rwandans cancelled talks with the Libyans.

=== Re-branding ===
In 1994, the airline was forced to cease flying to domestic destinations because of the Rwandan genocide, whilst internationally the airline reduced its network to include only Kigali, Bujumbura and Entebbe. In 1996, the airline was renamed to Rwanda Air and its fleet consisted only of the Boeing 707. At this time its network only included Gisenyi, Kamembe, Bujumbura, Ostend, Dar es Salaam, Entebbe and Kinshasa.

==== Alliance Express Rwanda ====
In November 1997, it was announced that Alliance Express, the regional arm of multi-national Uganda-based airline SA Alliance Air, had reached a deal with the Rwandan government to take over the operations of Rwanda Air, after which it would operate as Alliance Express Rwanda from 1 March 1998. The new airline operated on routes from Kigali to Entebbe, Kinshasa, Johannesburg and Nairobi with Boeing 737-200 equipment. The government continued to hold a majority 51% share in the airline, with Alliance Air taking a 49% stake. The airline began operations to Bujumbura in neighbouring Burundi on 8 February 1999. In its first year of operations Alliance Express Rwanda posted a US$4 million operating loss on US$6 million revenues, which the airline blamed on its inability to operate flights to the Democratic Republic of the Congo due to the Second Congo War. A dispute between Rwanda, Uganda and the Democratic Republic of the Congo, according to the airlines' deputy managing director, meant the Kigali-Lubumbashi-Kinshasa route could not be developed. By this time, the airline was also operating a Bombardier Dash 8 in addition to the 737.

==== Government Takeover ====
After the Ugandan-based SA Alliance Air ceased operations in October 2000, the Rwandan government entered into an agreement with South African Airways to ensure the Rwandan subsidiary would continue to operate. Operations continued until the company was eventually wound up on 30 November 2002 and its operations taken over by Rwandair Express, later to be rebranded as RwandAir.

== Historic fleet ==
Air Rwanda operated the following aircraft at some point in their 21 years of operations.

- Boeing 707
- de Havilland Canada DHC-6 Twin Otters
- Piper Aztec
- Britten-Norman Islander

After re-branding under Alliance Express Rwanda the airline operated

- Bombardier Dash 8
- Boeing 737-200
