= Pierre Célestin Munyanshongore =

Pierre Célestin Munyanshongore (born 1942 in Butare province and died in 2011) was an ethnic Hutu engineer in Rwanda. He attended university in Germany and graduated with a Mechanical Engineering degree in the 1960s. He was the director of a German project until 1994 and founder of the Association des Jeunes Professionels, a secondary school. At the end of the 1994 genocide Munyanshongore was arrested and released after eight years in prison. Before his death on November 27, 2011, he ran an education development project based in the Eastern province of Rwanda.
