= Bugesera International Airport =

Airport under construction in Rwanda

- IATA: none; ICAO: none

Summary
- Airport type: Public, Civilian
- Owner: Rwanda Civil Aviation Authority
- Serves: Kigali, Rwanda
- Location: Rilima, Bugesera District, Rwanda
- Elevation AMSL: 1,400 m (4,600 ft)
- Coordinates: 02°08′34″S 30°10′56″E

Maps
- Approximate location within Rwanda Bugesera (Africa)
- Interactive map of Bugesera International Airport

Runways
Direction	Length		Surface
Direction	m	ft	Surface
14/32	4,500	14,764	Asphalt

Bugesera International Airport (IATA: n/a, ICAO: n/a) is an airport in the Bugesera District of Rwanda under construction since 2017.

== Location ==
Bugesera Airport is located in southeastern Rwanda, in Bugesera District, near the town of Rilima. This location is approximately 25 kilometres (16 mi), by air, and about 40 kilometres (25 mi), by road, south of Kigali International Airport. The approximate coordinates of Bugesera International Airport are: 02°08'09.0"S, 30°11'00.0"E (Latitude:-2.135833; Longitude:30.183333). Bugesera International Airport is situated at an elevation of 1,400 metres (4,593 ft) above sea level.

== Planning phase, 2010–2016 ==
In November 2010, press reports indicated that the Rwanda government had retained the international accounting firm PricewaterhouseCoopers to provide financial advice and lead the search for funding the project. The government wanted to develop Bugesera Airport as a public-private-partnership project.

As of 2014, Bugesera International Airport was planned to become Rwanda's largest International Airport, serving commercial flights destined to and from the greater Kigali metropolitan area to become Rwanda's third international airport, the country's 8th airport overall and to complement Kigali International Airport, which as of 2014 was operating at maximum capacity. Until 2014, 2000 families were expropriated.

In September 2016, the government of Rwanda signed a binding agreement with Mota-Engil of Portugal to fund, build and operate a new airport for 25 years under concession from the government, with the contract renewable for an additional 15 years. Mota-Engil agreed to provide the $418 million to fund the first phase of construction. Commercial operations were expected to begin in 2018. The airport was to initially have a single paved runway and during the second phase of construction, a second runway was to be added. The estimated cost for Phase I to be completed in 2018 was US$418 million, while Phase II was budgeted to cost US$382 million, for a total of US$800 million. As of 2018, the British engineering firm, TPS Consult Plc. was commissioned to carry out a feasibility study and design the new airport.

== Construction, 2017–present ==
In August 2017, construction began with a doubling of the projected cost to US$828 million. Mota-Engil, through its subsidiary Mota-Engil Africa, was the main contractor and is to provide 75 percent of the funding. Rwandan company Aviation Travel and Logistics (ATL) was providing the remaining 25 percent of the funding and to provide ground handling services at the airport. Completion of the first phase was expected in 2019. In April 2019, construction was halted to make way for a redesign.

In December 2019, Qatar Airways agreed to continue the project, with a much larger airport being planned, at a construction budget of US$1.31 billion. The new airport would be able to handle one million passengers and 150,000 tonnes of cargo annually during its first phase. Bugesera International Airport would have a 30,000-square-metre passenger terminal with 22 check-in counters, ten gates, and six passenger boarding bridges. In December 2019, Qatar Airways agreed to take a 60 percent stake in the airport. As per the Rwanda Development Board, the first phase of construction would provide facilities for seven million passengers a year. The second phase, expected to be completed by 2032, would increase the capacity to 14 million passengers a year.

As of July 2023, the airport was expected to cost US$2 billion and to be completed in 2026. In November 2023, local newspaper The New Times reported that Rwanda's 26.7 megawatts expected from the 80 MW Rusumo Hydroelectric Power Station, will be dedicated to powering Bugesera International Airport.

In May 2024 the CEO of RwandAir Yvonne Manzi Makolo announced that completion of the new airport had been delayed to 2028.

== See also ==
- Kigali Airport
- Nyamata
- Rwanda Civil Aviation Authority
