= Rwanda Institute for Conservation Agriculture =

Rwandan higher education institution specialising in sustainable agriculture

Rwanda Institute for Conservation Agriculture (RICA)
- Type: Private
- Established: 2019
- Location: Gashora sector, Bugesera District, Eastern Province, Rwanda; 2.2705°S 30.2606°E
- Website: www.rica.rw

The Rwanda Institute for Conservation Agriculture (RICA) is a Rwandan higher education institution specialising in sustainable agriculture and environmental management. It is located in the Eastern Province, in Bugesera District (Gashora sector, Mwendo cell, Gaharwa village).

Created in partnership with the Government of Rwanda and the Howard G. Buffett Foundation, this university focuses on research aimed at advancing agriculture.

The institution offers students free three-year training in agricultural development. It began delivering courses in 2019 and became fully operational in 2021.
