= Kingdom of Bugesera =

Bantu kingdom in central Africa

- c. 16th century–c. 1799
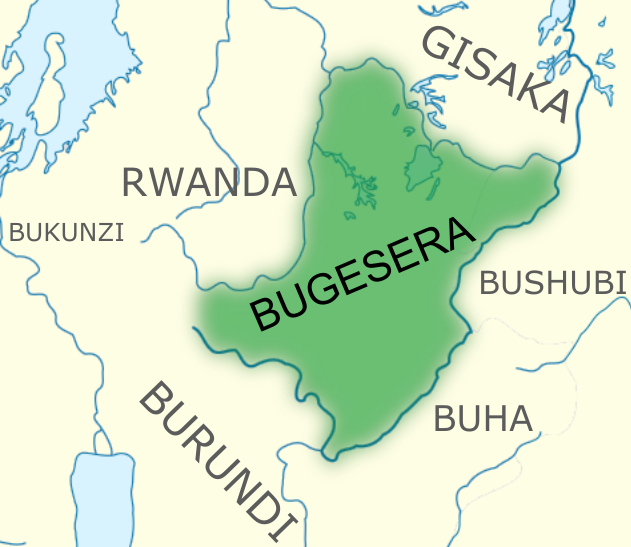
- Bugesera (green) and its neighbors, approximate borders c. 1700
- Religion: Traditional religion
- Government: Monarchy
- Mwami
  - fl. 17th/18th century: Nsoro Nyabarega
- History
  - Established: c. 16th century
  - Disestablished: c. 1799
Succeeded by
Kingdom of Burundi; Kingdom of Rwanda

The Kingdom of Bugesera (Kinyarwanda: Ubugesera) was an independent Bantu kingdom that existed from the 16th to 18th century in Central Africa. Around 1799, it was conquered and divided by the Kingdom of Rwanda and Kingdom of Burundi.

== Sources ==
Until the 19th century, the history of the states of the African Great Lakes was largely handed down through oral traditions and legends. The reliability of these is often unclear, and many oral retellings of local events contradict each other. For instance, some accounts of the eventual fall of Bugesera are anachronistic, attributing its conquest to monarchs of entirely different time periods. Further information can be gleamed from archaeology. However, little information was preserved for the Kingdom of Bugesera; the state is mainly known via Rwandan stories and records. Archaeological research is also lacking in the area formerly occupied by Bugesera. Thus, no reliable chronology or list of its kings can be established for Bugesera.

== History ==
=== Early dominance ===
The Bugesera kingdom was possibly founded in the 16th century. Its rulers were known as mwami (kings), similarly to the monarchs of other regional states. Accounts of the regional royal lineages have led some historians such as Jan Vansina to the conclusion that Bugesera originally dominated Rwanda, with the latter being a mere dependency ruled by a branch of the Bugeseran royal family. As some oral traditions claim that Burundi's Ganwa elite was related to Rwanda's royal clan, researchers Léonidas Ndoricimpa and Claude Guillet further suggested that Burundi could have also emerged as a subordinate principality of Bugesera. Indeed, up until the 18th century, the Kingdom of Bugesera was an extensive realm, as evidenced by many associated sites and tales. According to Rwandan stories, Bugesa sheltered Prince Mwendo after the latter had attempted to murder mwami Cyilima I Rugwe of Rwanda. In addition, divine oracles reportedly informed Cyilima I Rugwe that Nyanguge, wife of mwami Nsoro Bihembe of Bugesera, was the destined queen of Rwanda. To obtain her, Cyilima I Rugwe befriended Bugesera and even ceded territory to Bugesera. This newly won territory was later lost to the Kingdom of Gisaka due to Nyoro invasions. However, Nyanguge was possibly already pregnant when she was sent to Cyilima I Rugwe; the next Rwandan mwami, Kigeli I Mukobanya, was thus widely believed to be the son of Nsoro Bihembe of Bugesera.

Various Rwandan legends tell of events relating to Bugesera during the reign of mwami Mibambwe Mutabazi of Rwanda, son of Kigeli I Mukobanya. According to one tale, mwami Nsoro Sangano of Bugesera gave shelter to Prince Mashira of the Nduga kingdom when the latter was conquered by Mibambwe Mutabazi. Mashira later retook Nduga. In another story, the Nyoro people once again launched an invasion of the region, capturing Nsoro Sangano and forcing him to act as a scout for their armies. However, the Rwandans and their allies defeated the Nyoro invaders; Nsoro Sangano was left abandoned in the Ngiga forests far from home.

According to another Rwandan legend, mwami Mibambwe Mutabazi of Rwanda formed an alliance with Bugesera and Burundi at one point in history to avenge the murder of his mother in "Bunyabungo", an area corresponding to the region west of Lake Kivu. Led by Nsoro Sangano or his successor Muhoza, Bugeseran armies invaded "Bunyabungo" and ravaged the land, killing a local king and taking his pregnant wife as prisoner. This wife gave birth to a son named Sibula (or "Ntsibura"); when the latter grew up, he was able to return to his homeland, rose to king, and took revenge by killing Rwandan mwami Ndahiro II Cyamatare. In the legend, Sibula's storied travels are used to explain why several local kingdoms highly respected drums as symbols of royal authority. However, this legend is only partially corroborated by other oral traditions; thus it is mostly likely only partially historical. Another oral telling of this story claims that Ntare II Kibogora of Burundi invaded Bugesera, then ruled by Rwagitare, whereupon Rwanda intervened on Bugesera's side. The intervention resulted in a peace agreement, ultimately leading to a cultural exchange.

=== Decline ===
By the start of the 18th century, Bugesera had diminished and become one of the weaker regional states. In contrast, the kingdoms of Rwanda and Gisaka had grown more powerful. At this point, most of the local states had hostile relationships, often fighting over territory and engaging in regular cattle raiding. However, Bugesera's relations to Gisaka were relatively stable. Bugesera's last major ruler was Nsoro Nyabarega who is associated with cave inscriptions as well as oral traditions that are spread over a large area in modern-day Rwanda and Burundi. However, mwami Ntare I of Burundi launched several wars of expansion, including against Bugesera. Some oral traditions claim that the Bugeseran army actually managed to invade Ntare's lands and was only stopped at Mbuye, allowing the Burundians to turn the tide of war. As an ancient stone structure, possibly a victory monument, was discovered at Mbuye, these traditions are regarded as credible. After his army was defeated, mwami Nsoro Nyabarega of Bugesera fled north, and took refuge with Rwandan mwami Yuhi III Mazimpaka. When Ntare threatened to invade Rwanda unless Nsoro was extradited, the latter was expelled from the Rwandan capital but allowed to go free.

In the late 18th century, a great drought affected both Rwanda and Burundi, whereas Bugesera was largely spared. Mwami Ntare IV of Burundi responded to this crisis by invading Bugesera's southern heartland to capture new cattle and pastures for his realm. The Burundians heavily defeated the army of Bugesera, and then annexed the occupied territory. Meanwhile, opportunistic Rwandan herders moved into the remaining Bugeseran territory from the north; they encountered little resistance and were quickly able to seize a substantial area. According to one legend, the herders were actually inspired by a "madman" who rallied Rwanda's commoners to invade Bugesera because he felt that he had been cheated by Bugeseran traders.

Realizing the extent of Bugesera's weakness, the Kingdom of Rwanda under mwami Sentabyo subsequently launched its own invasion and quickly captured the Bugeseran royal drum and royal herd. As these were the signs of authority of the monarch, their loss broke the Kingdom of Bugesera. The state collapsed and Rwanda annexed its remaining territory. The last Bugeseran monarch fled into exile; he later attempted to return, but was soon captured and executed. Historian Jan Vansina estimated that the Kingdom of Bugesera fell in 1799.

The modern-day Bugesera District of Rwanda is named after the old kingdom.

== Government and territory ==
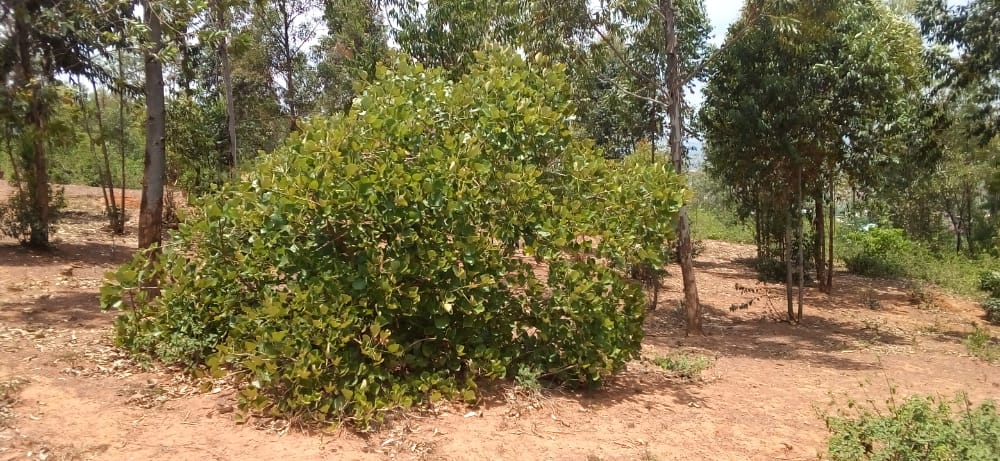
Shrubland in modern-day Bugesera District. This area was part of the kingdom's north; its dry savanna did not allow for a high population density.

The mwami of Bugesera traditionally took the name "Nsoro". The Bahondongo were the state's royal clan.

The Kingdom of Bugesera was located south of the rivers Akanyaru and Nyabarongo, and north of the Rurubu. To its west was the Kinyaga region. Its territory was mainly dominated by dry savanna and thus sparsely populated, though its southern area was more fertile.

=== Known mwami ===
As no reliable or chronological list of rulers can be established for Bugesera, the following monarchs are not necessarily in the right order or even historical figures:

- Nsoro Bihembe
- Nsoro Sangano
- Muhoza
- Rwagitare
- Nsoro Nyabarega
