= JetLink Express =

Kenyan regional airline

IATA	ICAO	Call sign
J0	JLX	KEN JET
- Founded: 2006
- Ceased operations: 2012
- Hubs: Jomo Kenyatta International Airport
- Fleet size: 7
- Destinations: 8
- Headquarters: Embakasi, Nairobi, Kenya
- Key people: Elly Aluvale, MD and CEO
- Website: www.jetlink.co.ke

JetLink Express was a Kenyan regional airline with its head office in the Freight Complex in Embakasi, Nairobi. It operated out of Jomo Kenyatta International Airport.

All flight activities have been stopped since 16 November 2012, due to financial problems.

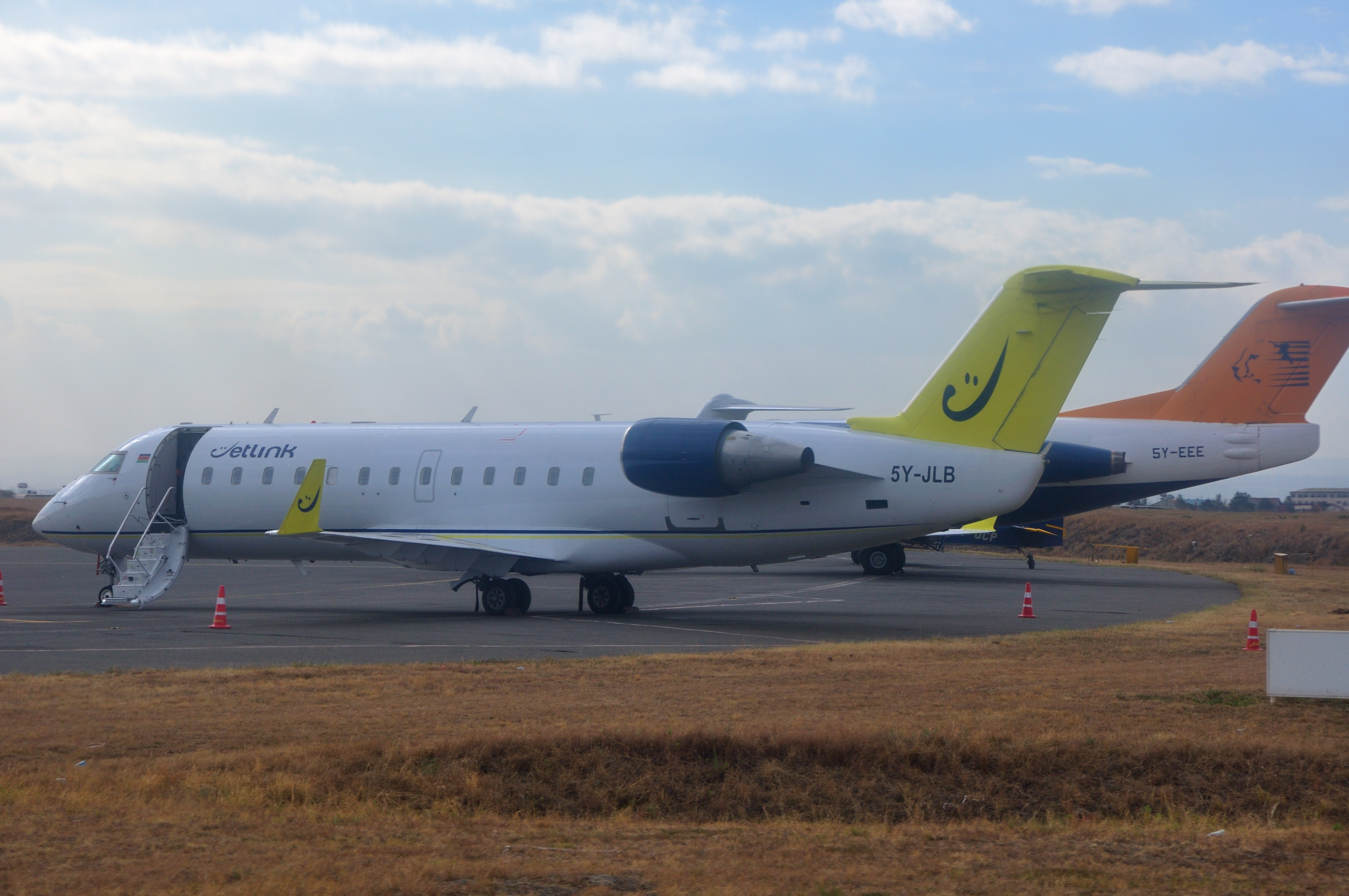
A JetLink Express CRJ200LR

On 28 January 2013 Fastjet announced that it had signed a Memorandum of Understanding ("MoU") with Jetlink. Under the terms of the MoU, Fastjet and Jetlink were to create a joint venture which would lead to the launch of the Fastjet brand in Kenya. The MoU is subject to a number of conditions precedent, including Board and any other necessary approvals.

== Destinations ==
Jetlink Express served the following:

Kenya

- Eldoret - Eldoret International Airport
- Kisumu - Kisumu Airport
- Mombasa - Moi International Airport
- Nairobi - Jomo Kenyatta International Airport hub

South Sudan

- Juba - Juba Airport

Tanzania

- Mwanza - Mwanza Airport

== Accidents ==
- On November 12, 2009, a JetLink Express CRJ-100 operated by RwandAir as RwandAir Flight 205 crashed into a VIP terminal at Kigali. A person died. The rest survived.
