= Association des Jeunes Professionnels =

Association des Jeunes Professionnels (AJEPO) was a Rwandan secondary school founded by Pierre Célestin Munyanshongore.. Now occupied by Nyamata High School, AJEPO was Bugesera District's oldest private technical school until July 1994.
