= Gashora =

- Village and sector
- Location within Rwanda
- Coordinates: 2.20742°S 30.24547°E
- Country: Rwanda
- Province: Eastern Province
- District: Bugesera District

Area
  - Village and sector: 98.83 km^{2} (38.16 sq mi)

Population (2022 census)
  - Village and sector: 32,251
  - Density: 326.3/km^{2} (845.2/sq mi)
  - Urban: 4,052

Gashora is a village and sector in Bugesera District, Eastern Province in Rwanda, with a population of 32,251 (2022 census) and an area of 98.83 square kilometers.
