= Hope International (Christian microfinance) =

Christian non-profit organization

Coordinates: 40°04′35.1″N 76°20′06.1″W

HOPE International
- Formation: 1997 (29 years ago)
- Founder: Jeff Rutt
- Type: nonprofit
- Tax ID no.: 23-2836648
- Legal status: 501(c)(3)
- Purpose: Financial services
- Headquarters: 227 Granite Run Dr; Ste 250; Lancaster, PA 17601-6826; USA
- Products: Microfinance
- President: Peter K. Greer
- Board chair: Jeff Rutt
- Revenue: $59,938,812 (2024)
- Expenses: $57,322,319 (2024)
- Website: www.hopeinternational.org

HOPE International is a Christian faith-based nonprofit organization based in Lancaster, Pennsylvania that equips individuals living in poverty with savings and microfinance services. HOPE International now operates in over 30 underserved countries and has provided more than 3.3 million people worldwide with access to small loans and savings services since it began operations in 1997.

== History ==
Following the fall of the Soviet Union in the early 1990s, Jeff Rutt, a Lancaster, Pennsylvania-based homebuilder, began making numerous trips to Ukraine with his church. In an effort to support the material needs of people in one Ukrainian community, Rutt and his fellow congregants would also transport containers of food, clothing, and medical supplies.

After several of these visits, a local pastor pulled Rutt aside and told him candidly that the shipments were not helping. Although people were accessing needed supplies, they had become dependent on the free donations and local businesses could not compete. The well-intentioned aid shipments were actually doing more harm than good by depressing local industry and initiative.

Struck by the unintended consequences of his actions, Rutt began looking into different forms of development aid and eventually initiated a microfinance program to empower Ukrainians. The program was successful, and in 1997, Rutt established HOPE International.

After further work in Ukraine, HOPE began expanding into other countries in need of its services. In 2004, Peter K. Greer became HOPE's president and CEO after spending several years at various microfinance organizations and attending graduate school at Harvard University (Kennedy School of Government).

=== Homes for HOPE ===
Homes for HOPE, an affiliate program of HOPE International, was established in 1998 by Jeff Rutt. Through Homes for HOPE, home builders and trade partners are able to build benefit homes on a pro bono basis. To date, the organization has raised more than $19,000,000 in support of HOPE International, and has completed housing projects in 23 states across the United States, as well as in Alberta, Canada. In 2008, Rutt was awarded the Hearthstone Builder Humanitarian Award for his humanitarian efforts.

== Approach to poverty alleviation ==
HOPE International operates through two models.

=== Savings groups ===
The first model is the savings group program. HOPE partners with local churches and denominations to support the formation of savings groups, which are run as ministries of the Christian faith communities. Though each group creates its own rules and guidelines, they operate on rotating savings and credit association (ROSCA) or accumulating savings and credit association (ASCA) models. Most have 10 to 20 members, who meet regularly to make savings deposits into a common fund. Clients save money to stabilize household income, provide a safety net for emergencies, start or expand businesses, or pay for household expenses like school fees or home improvement. Most groups also allow members to take out loans in addition to building their savings.

Beyond saving, group members also meet to connect, offer mutual support, pray, and worship together.

=== Microfinance institutions ===
HOPE's second model is microfinance institutions. This approach involves a group of 10-50 entrepreneurs who receive loans together from HOPE International or its local partner. Each loan recipient cross-guarantees the loans of other group members since there is no form of collateral to offer for the loan. Accountability to the group provides an incentive to make regular loan repayments.

In certain HOPE-network countries, entrepreneurs can qualify for individual loans, typically for higher loan amounts than those in the group model. Clients may graduate from receiving group loans once they have proven creditworthiness, or they may qualify from the start due to their financial situation, business success, or credit history.

== Tracking outcomes ==
HOPE measures impact across four domains: material, personal, social, and spiritual. In 2014, they formed a Listening, Monitoring, and Evaluation (LM&E) team to better understand the impact of their services.

In a survey conducted in Malawi in 2019, where HOPE has worked since 2013, they learned that 81% of savings group members surveyed reported being able to meet a significant financial emergency need within one month, compared to 37% of the broader Malawian population as reported by the World Bank in The Global FINDEX Database 2017.

In 2023, HOPE partnered with a third party, 60 Decibels, to measure the impact of Urwego Finance, HOPE's microfinance institution in Rwanda. Key findings from the 500 entrepreneurs who participated in the survey are as follows:

- Three in five surveyed entrepreneurs accessed a loan for the first time.
- 47% of surveyed entrepreneurs said their business earnings have "very much increased." By this measure of impact, Urwego ranks in the top 20% of all MFIs surveyed by 60 Decibels.
- 97% of surveyed entrepreneurs said their quality of life had improved, with many pointing to their ability to cover expenses and buy assets.
- 80% of surveyed entrepreneurs said the number and quality of their family's meals increased.
- Before joining Urwego, surveyed entrepreneurs who were surveyed employed, on average, three employees. After working with Urwego, they employed an average of seven employees.

== Financial accountability ==
HOPE International's work is funded through individual donors, churches, foundations, businesses, and Homes for HOPE. HOPE's microfinance institution model also provides sustainable sources of capital because HOPE-network loan recipients repay loans with interest, and investments remain in their local microfinance institution. Between 2019 – 2023, approximately 98% of loans in the HOPE network were repaid, stimulating the local economy and allowing for continued loan distribution.

Charity Navigator has awarded HOPE International its highest four-star rating for 15 consecutive years (2006–2021), and as of June 2025, HOPE earned a score of 100% in accountability and transparency and an overall rating of 100%.

HOPE International also has a philanthropic dividend policy. As HOPE-led microfinance institutions become sustainable, they are committed to giving away 10% of their profits to support local Christian ministries serving children and youth.

== Countries in which HOPE International operates / Partner organizations ==
- Benin: Savings group program established in 2023
- Burundi: Turame Community Finance partnership established in 2008 and transitioned to HOPE-managed in 2016; HOPE savings group program launched in 2012; savings group program partnership established with Compassion International in 2018
- Dominican Republic: Esperanza partnership established in 2005 and transitioned to HOPE-managed in 2023
- Ethiopia: Savings group partnership established with Ethiopian Guenet Church Development and Welfare Organization and Meserete Kristos Church in 2023
- El Salvador: Savings group partnership established with Compassion International in 2023 and ENLACE in 2021
- Guatemala: Savings group partnership established with 410 Bridge in 2023
- Haiti: Savings group program established in 2009
- Honduras: Savings group partnership established with Compassion International in 2024
- Indonesia: Savings group program partnership established with Compassion International in 2019
- Kenya: Small and Micro Enterprise Program (SMEP) Microfinance Bank partnership established and transitioned to HOPE-managed in 2023; savings group program partnerships established with Compassion International, Untold, and 410 Bridge in 2023
- Malawi: Savings group program established in 2013
- Moldova: Microfinance partnership established with Invest-Credit in 2005
- Paraguay: Diaconía partnership established in 2018
- Peru: Comas Christian & Missionary Alliance Church partnership established in 2011
- Philippines: Center for Community Transformation (CCT) partnership established in 2007
- Republic of Congo: Microfinance program established in 2010
- Romania: Microfinance partnership established with ROMCOM in 2007
- Rwanda: Urwego Finance partnership established in 2005 and transitioned to HOPE-managed in 2016; HOPE savings program established in 2007; savings group program partnership established with Compassion International in 2019
- Tanzania: HOPE savings group program established in 2022; savings group program partnerships established with the Anglican Diocese of Mount Kilimanjaro and Compassion International in 2023
- Thailand: Savings group program partnership established with Compassion International in 2018
- Ukraine: Microfinance program established in 1997; savings group program established in 2017
- Uganda: Savings group program partnership established with Seed Effect in 2021, the Diocese of Kitgum in 2024, and the Diocese of Northern Uganda in 2024
- South Asia: Savings group program partnerships established in 2007, 2011, 2014, and 2023 (specific country and partner names withheld for security reasons)
- Zambia: Savings group program established in 2015
- Zimbabwe: Savings group program partnership established in 2011; transitioned to HOPE-managed in 2017

== Governance ==
HOPE International has a 14-member board of trustees chaired by Jeff Rutt. Peter Greer was appointed as president of the organization in 2004 after working abroad with various microfinance organizations and graduating from Harvard Kennedy School. Greer heads HOPE International's executive council. Program directors also oversee the organization's work from within its countries of operation.
