= Rilima =

Town in Eastern Province, Rwanda

- Town and sector
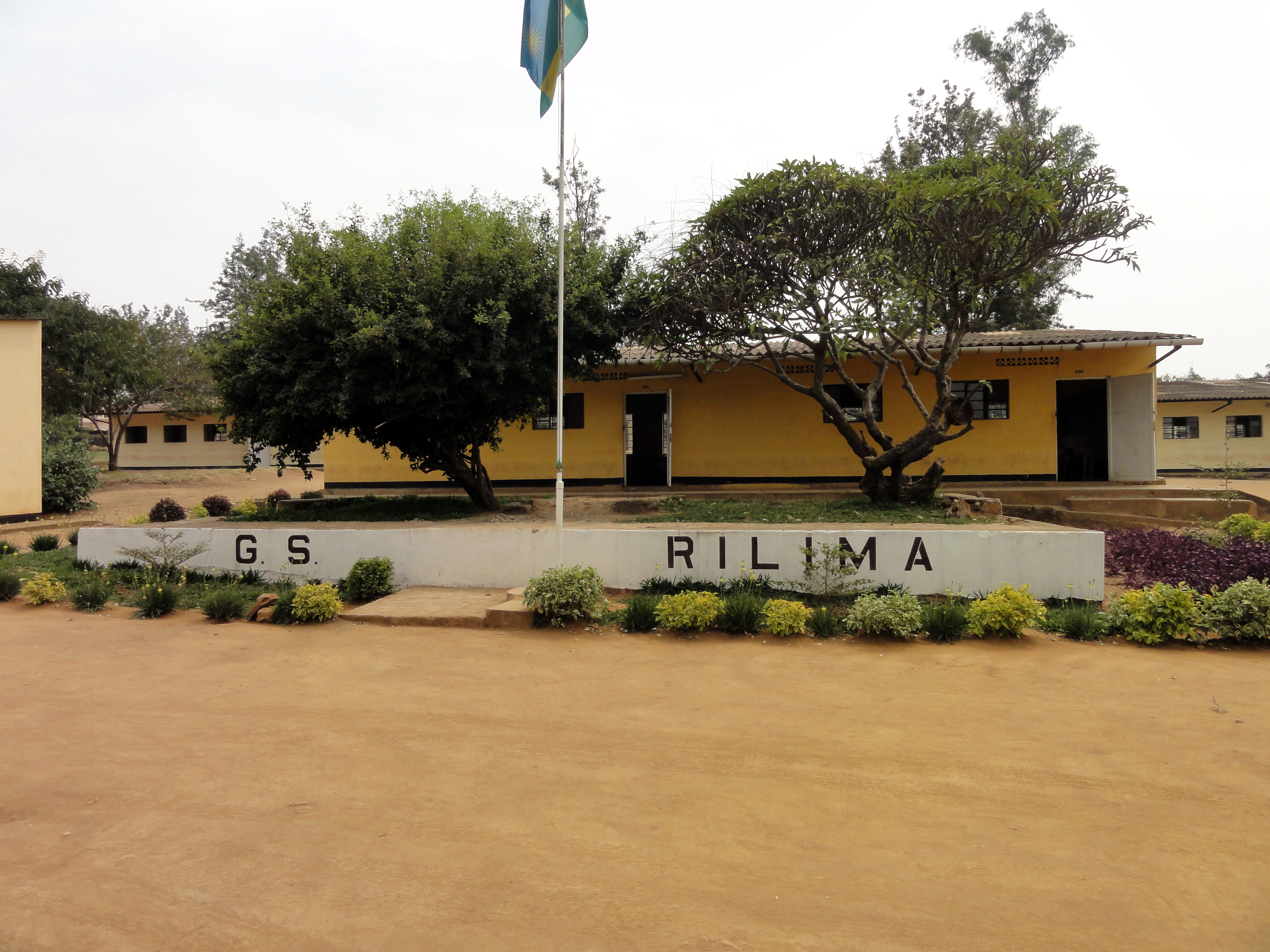
- Building in Rilima

- Location in Rwanda
- Coordinates: 2°09′35″S 30°13′33″E
- Country: Rwanda
- Province: Eastern Province
- District: Bugesera District

Area
  - Town and sector: 81.48 km^{2} (31.46 sq mi)
- Elevation: 1,394 m (4,573 ft)

Population (2022 census)
  - Town and sector: 32,862
  - Density: 403.3/km^{2} (1,045/sq mi)
  - Urban: 28,342
- Climate: Aw

Rilima is a town and sector in southeastern Rwanda. It is the nearest urban center to Bugesera International Airport.

== Location ==
Rilima is located in Bugesera District, Eastern Province, south of Kigali, the national capital and the largest city in the country. Its location is about 42.5 kilometres (26.4 mi), by road, south of Kigali. The geographical coordinates of Rilima are:02°09'35.0"S, 30°13'31.0"E (Latitude:-2.159722; Longitude:30.225278). Rilima is situated at an altitude of 1,394 metres (4,573 ft) above sea level.

== Overview ==
Rilima is reachable from Kigali, in about one hour by private car. Among the institutions found in or near the town is the Centre Orthopédique Sainte Marie Rilima (Saint Mary's Othopedic Hospital Rilima), a 70-bed orthopedic hospital that specializes in treating pediatric orthopedic problems, including club foot, bow-legs and others.

Another institution found in the town is the Rilima Prison, which holds over 7,400 inmates, the majority of whom are awaiting trial. The Rilima Health Centre is an outreach healthcare facility that distributes food to nutritionally vulnerable women and children. It instructs mothers on how to prepare the donated food for achieving optimum benefits. Parents are also taught how to grow nutritious vegetables. Family planning services, good hygiene practices and balanced diet selection are taught.

The most recent institution to come to Rilima is Bugesera International Airport, whose construction started in August 2017, and completion of the first phase is expected in 2019.

== See also ==
- Nyamata
