= Mareba =

- Village and sector
- Location within Rwanda
- Coordinates: 2.24709°S 30.06886°E
- Country: Rwanda
- Province: Eastern Province
- District: Bugesera District

Area
  - Village and sector: 55.91 km^{2} (21.59 sq mi)

Population (2022 census)
  - Village and sector: 29,266
  - Density: 523.4/km^{2} (1,356/sq mi)
  - Urban: 3,044

Mareba is a village and sector in Bugesera District, Eastern Province in Rwanda, with a population of 29,266 (2022 census) and an area of 55.91 square kilometers.
