= Mayange =

- Town and sector
- Location within Rwanda
- Coordinates: 2.20654°S 30.14141°E
- Country: Rwanda
- Province: Eastern Province
- District: Bugesera District

Area
  - Town and sector: 146.8 km^{2} (56.7 sq mi)

Population (2022 census)
  - Town and sector: 54,084
  - Density: 368.4/km^{2} (954.2/sq mi)
  - Urban: 35,039

Mayange is a town and sector in Bugesera District, Eastern Province in Rwanda, with a population of 54,084 (2022 census) and an area of 146.8 square kilometers.
