= Esperanza International =

US-based nonprofit organization

- Founded: 1995
- Founder: Dave Valle
- Purpose: Economic development
- Location: Dallas, Texas, United States
- Region served: Dominican Republic
- Website: esperanza.org

Esperanza is a Christian-based not-for-profit organization that is devoted to helping poverty-stricken people of the Dominican Republic through finance, education, health, and spiritual programs. It is classified as a 501(c)(3) nonprofit organization in the State of Washington, US, and as a non-governmental organization in the Dominican Republic. Its primary services are centered around its microfinance program, which provides small loans to impoverished families and business owners, to progress economic development and pull communities out of poverty. It was founded in 1995 by former Major League Baseball player Dave Valle and his wife Vicky. Esperanza is headquartered in Santo Domingo, has 10,000 associates in the Dominican Republic and Haiti, has distributed 200,000 loans, supported 200 schools, and provided access to clean water through 50 water projects.

== History ==
Esperanza International ("esperanza" translates to "hope" in English) was first inspired in 1985 by a group of Dominican Republican children that organization founder and former Seattle Mariners catcher Dave Valle met while playing baseball in the Dominican Republic. Instead of approaching the professional baseball player for autographs like most adolescents in the United States do, the children were asking Valle and his wife for food. After buying food from a local vendor for the children, Valle recognized that he was only giving a temporary solution to a complex problem. He wanted to help these people get back on their feet by providing long-lasting solutions to help families and develop their communities.

Esperanza was founded in Seattle, Washington, in 1995 and began operations in the Dominican Republic in 1999. Over time, the organization has grown to ten branch offices. In 2004, Esperanza partnered with Hope International to collaborate their financial capital missions.

In 2006, it joined with Smiles for Life to host three dental clinics. In 2011, Esperanza and Edify partnered to create loan programs for Christian-based schools. After three years working in Haiti, the organization ended outreach operations in the country in January 2016.

== Areas of work and impact ==
The organization exclusively focuses on those in need in the Dominican Republic, more specifically, mothers, the materially poor, and socially marginalized citizens. The four services Esperanza provides are financial, educational, medical, and spiritual. Over the 20 years of operation, Esperanza has dispersed 210,000 loans, outreached to 1,000,000+ individuals, and distributed over $65,000,000 in loan capital.

=== Financial Services ===
==== Loans ====
Community banks, or "Banks of Esperanza", each consist of fifteen or more entrepreneurs who have agreed to guarantee each other's loans as a group. The community bank holds its members accountable through saving funds, financial training, and repaying their loans on a regular basis.

Individual entrepreneur loans allow borrowers with good credit to make payments on loans and receive advice from loan officers individually.

Home improvement loans cover construction costs on houses and home businesses such as concrete and plumbing.

School advancement loans are used for the building renovations, technology, and educator training of Christian-based private schools. Esperanza works with Edify, an education development nonprofit organization, for this loan program.

Water project loans are given to churches for water filtration systems. The churches sell the filtered water at low prices to their local communities, pay off the loans with the funds, and use the remaining profit for investments for their own ministries.

==== Collateral ====
Mandatory savings is a requirement for loan borrowers to deposit 5% of loan balances into a savings account in order to prepare for emergencies and future investments.

=== Complimentary Services ===
==== Education ====
Esperanza provides literacy and vocational courses as well as business trainings. Literacy courses consist of basic lifestyle and academic training. Teachers spend four to ten months instructing on good hygiene and healthy diets as well as math, reading, and writing skills. Vocational courses are more focused on specific trades such as sewing, artisanship, decorative art, and baking. This allows the local people to turn their individual abilities into an entrepreneurship. These trades will create, improve, and expand businesses and, as a result, generate wealth for the entrepreneurs and the community. Business trainings provide instruction on fundamental elements that support business operations such as customer service, product quality, appearance and image, and marketing.

==== Health ====
Esperanza offers medical assistance in two main categories: cervical cancer prevention and dental health. For those who have geographical or financial barriers to easily get medical attention, the organization provides health examinations, cervical cancer tests, teeth extractions, cavity fillings, and preventative dental health information.

Additionally, health trainings are implemented to educate on infection and illness prevention, balanced diets, STDs and HIV, breast cancer detection, and cervical cancer testing.

==== Spiritual ====
The organization partners with Dominican Republican pastors to provide spiritual guidance and emotional support to the local communities.

== Financials ==
For the year ended in 2014, Esperanza earned $1,748,723 in revenue, earning all but $10,204 of that revenue from contributions, gifts, and grants. Esperanza spent $1,416,433 (75.6%) on program expenses, $213,748 (11.4%) on administrative expenses, and $242,930 (13%) on fundraising expenses totaling operating expenses to $1,873,111. It reported a $124,388 deficit for the year and net assets of $605,154.

== External reviews ==
In June 2016, the charity evaluator Charity Navigator gave Esperanza International a three-star (out of four) rating and an 81.35 score (out of 100) in financials. For accountability and transparency, it received a four-star rating and 93 score. This combined total gives the organization a three-star rating and an 85.91 score overall. Another charity evaluator, Philanthropedia, commended Esperanza for their strengths in leadership, technology, and partnerships among Dominican Republican, Haitian, and U.S. organizations. The evaluator recommended that the organization focus on long-term profitability and fewer, more concentrated goals in order to maximize effectiveness for a longer period.
