= Ndahiro II Cyamatare =

- Mwami (King)
- Died: Gisenyi, Kingdom of Rwanda
- Issue: Ruganzu II Ndoli
- Dynasty: Nyiginya dynasty (2rd)

Ndahiro II Cyamatare was, according to tradition, Mwami of the Kingdom of Rwanda at the end of the fifteenth century. He was supposed to have reigned between 1477 and 1510, during a period of conflict. He was killed in the Gisenyi district fighting the king of the Bugara, and his son, Ruganzu II Ndoli, succeeded him.

Regnal titles
Preceded by Yuhi wa II Gahima II	King of Rwanda; 1477–1510	Succeeded by Ruganzu II Ndoli
