= Mibambwe I Sekarongoro I Mutabazi =

- Mwami (King) of Rwanda
- Issue: Yuhi II Gahima II
- Dynasty: Nyiginya dynasty

Mibambwe I Sekarongoro I Mutabazi was, according to tradition, Mwami of the Kingdom of Rwanda who was supposed to have ruled in the fifteenth century. He was able to expand the borders of the Kingdom of Rwanda, due in part to his heroic actions when fighting. In one instance during his youth, he suffered from crucial injuries which he had incurred when fighting at the frontlines. Such actions inspired the proverb "Keep your food, if you don't know the story at Fumbwe." One of the most important decisions he made as Mwami was concerning the Bunyoro and Bunyabungo communities. Because of previous battles with the Bunyoro, he opted to wage war against them. At the same time, he sought peace with the Bunyabungo community, who had organized peace offerings with Rwanda at a previous time.

Regnal titles
Preceded by Kigeli I Mukobanya	King of Rwanda	Succeeded by Yuhi II Gahima II
