= Kigeli I Mukobanya =

Mwami of Rwanda

- Mwami (King) of Rwanda
- Burial: Rubingo Shyorongi
- Dynasty: Nyiginya dynasty (2nd)
- Father: Cyilima Rugwe
- Mother: Nyirakigeri I Nyanguge

Kigeli I Mukobanya was, according to tradition, Mwami of the Kingdom of Rwanda. Different dates of his reign are given in various sources, such as c. 1460 CE, 1520-1543 GB, or 1378 C.E to 1418 C.E. His reign was characterized by the infiltration and surprise attack near his Kigali hill palace by the army of King Cwamali of Bunyoro in Uganda. Kigeli I, together with his son Sekarongoro I, staged a defensive battle against Cwamali's army around what is modern-day Kigali city. Sekarongoro I Mutabazi sustained an injury to his forehead, bleeding, which lead the Rwandan army to retreat.

King Kigeli I Mukobanya withdrew from his palace with his cows and re-positioned across Nyabarongo River. Cwamali's army burnt his house and planted a victory tree at Runda. They then crossed the river and pursued Kigeli I. This time Kigeli I Mukobanya's army had reorganized itself and returned a powerful counteroffensive.

The Bunyoro army suffered numerous casualties and a great defeat, with some captured as prisoners of war. The Banyoro captives had their fingers and toes mutilated and sent back to Bunyoro as a message to instill fear into King Cwamali.

Some scholars describe Kigeli I Mukobanya as having conquered and ruled Bunyoro and Buganda, as he may be listed as Kigala Mukabya in Buganda oral history.

Regnal titles
Preceded by Cyilima Rugwe	King of Rwanda; 1378–1418	Succeeded by Mibambwe I Sekarongoro I Mutabazi
