= Bugesera District =

Coordinates: 02°12′18″S 30°08′42″E

- District
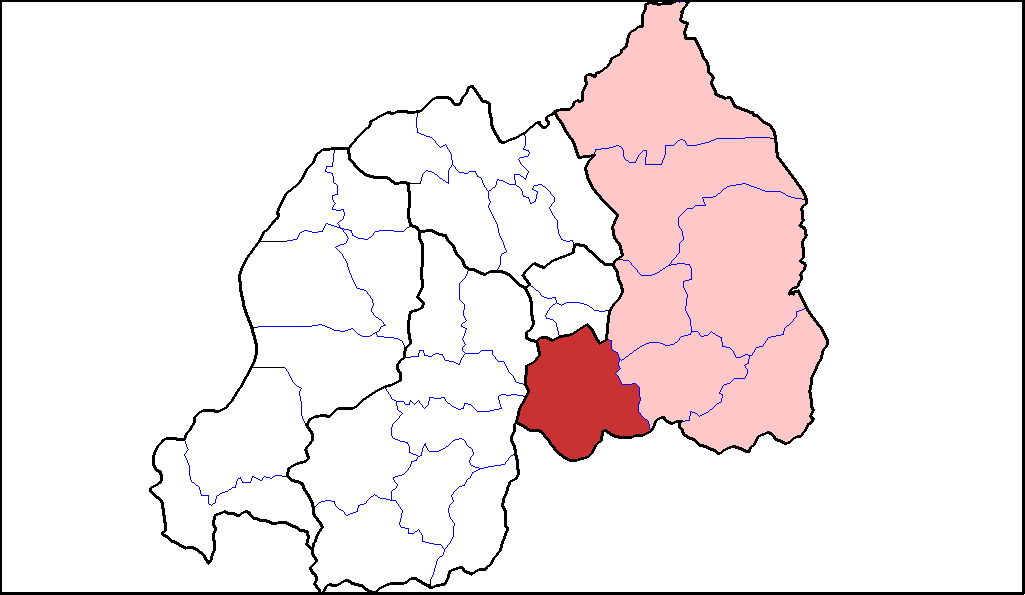
- Shown within Eastern Province and Rwanda
- Country: Rwanda
- Province: Eastern
- Capital: Nyamata

Area
  - District: 1,288 km^{2} (497 sq mi)

Population (2022 census)
  - District: 551,103
  - Density: 427.9/km^{2} (1,108/sq mi)
  - Urban: 221,227

Bugesera is a district (akarere) in Eastern Province, Rwanda. It is one of the 30 districts in Rwanda and its capital is Nyamata and is named after the old Kingdom of Bugesera.

The district is the location of two memorial sites of the 1994 Genocide Against the Tutsi at Ntarama and Nyamata.

== Geography ==
Bugesera comprises areas south of Kigali, which were formerly in the Kigali Ngali province, around the town of Nyamata.

It borders Burundi, Kicukiro district, Ngoma district, and Kamonyi district in the South, North, East and West respectively.

It is 1337 km^{2} in size and inhabited by 551,103 people (from the population census in 2022).

The area is prone to droughts as it has a higher average daytime temperature than the Rwandan average, and lower precipitation. It is a rain deficit risk zone in Rwanda, having experienced 3 droughts in the last 20 years

== Sectors ==
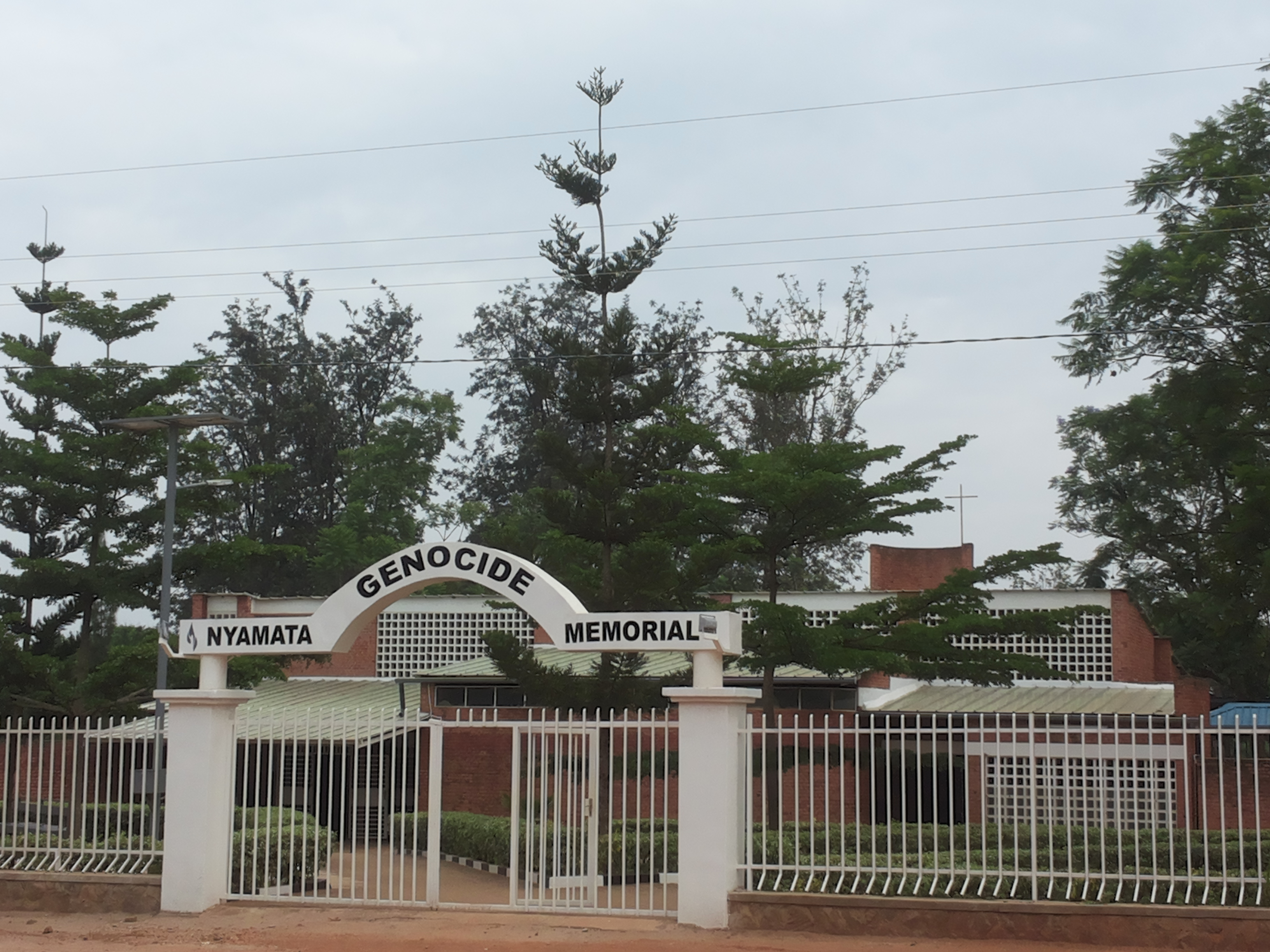
Nyamata Genocide Memorial Site

Bugesera district is divided into 15 sectors (imirenge): Gashora, Juru, Kamabuye, Ntarama, Mareba, Mayange, Musenyi, Mwogo, Ngeruka, Nyamata, Nyarugenge, Rilima, Ruhuha, Rweru and Shyara.

== Economy ==
Recently, Bugesera will have industrial district named Bugesera Special Economic Zone (BSEZ) and built by the ARISE Integrated Industrial Platforms (ARISE IIP) with funding from Indian and South Korean investors. It is 14.83 km^{2} (1,483 ha; 3,660 acres) wide — located 10 km (5 mi) from new international airport in Bugesera and 50 km (30 mi) from Rwanda's capital, Kigali.

The airport under construction will serve Kigali, 40 km away, and the rest of the nation, replacing Kigali International Airport in the future.

== See also ==
- Rwanda Institute for Conservation Agriculture
- Association des Jeunes Professionels
