= Urwego Bank =

Bank of Rwanda

Urwego Bank Plc
- Company type: Private company
- Industry: Financial services
- Founded: 1997; 29 years ago
- Headquarters: Kigali, Rwanda
- Area served: Rwanda
- Key people: Christine Baingana (Chief Executive Officer)
- Products: Loans, individual loans, group loans, savings, investments
- Total assets: 19,649,524,000 RWF ($22,352,200 USD) (2018)
- Owner: Hope International (99%)
- Website: www.urwegobank.com

Urwego Bank (Urwego) is a Rwandan Christian-centered Microfinance bank in Rwanda. It is licensed by the National Bank of Rwanda, the national banking regulator.

== History ==
Founded in 1997 by World Relief as Urwego Community Banking, the bank joined the Hope International network in 2005. In 2007, the bank merged with Opportunity International Bank of Rwanda to become Urwego Opportunity Bank.

With the approval of the National Bank of Rwanda, Opportunity International sold its 50% ownership of Urwego to HOPE International in 2017, making HOPE a 99% shareholder in the bank, with World Relief continuing to own 1%.

== Overview ==
Urwego Bank is a licensed, Christian faith-based microfinance bank. Drawing upon its name (Urwego is the Kinyarwanda word that translates as “ladder” in English), Urwego's mission statement is, “To provide a ladder of opportunity to under-served communities in Rwanda as we proclaim and live the Gospel of Jesus Christ.”

Urwego purpose for creation is to reach Rwandans who are economically active but under-served by licensed banking institutions, offering financial services, loans and savings programs.

Throughout its history, Urwego Bank has distributed nearly $290 million in loans.

== Ownership ==
According to the bank's website, the following corporate entities are shareholders.

Owner	Percentage ownership
Hope International	99%
World Relief	1%
Total	100.00

== Branch network ==
As of July 2019, Urwego Bank had 15 branches, seven of which, including the bank's headquarters, are located in the city of Kigali, Rwanda's capital. In addition, Urwego had 15 ATM locations across the country.

== See also ==
- List of banks in Rwanda
- Economy of Rwanda
