= Kigali International Airport =

International airport in Rwanda

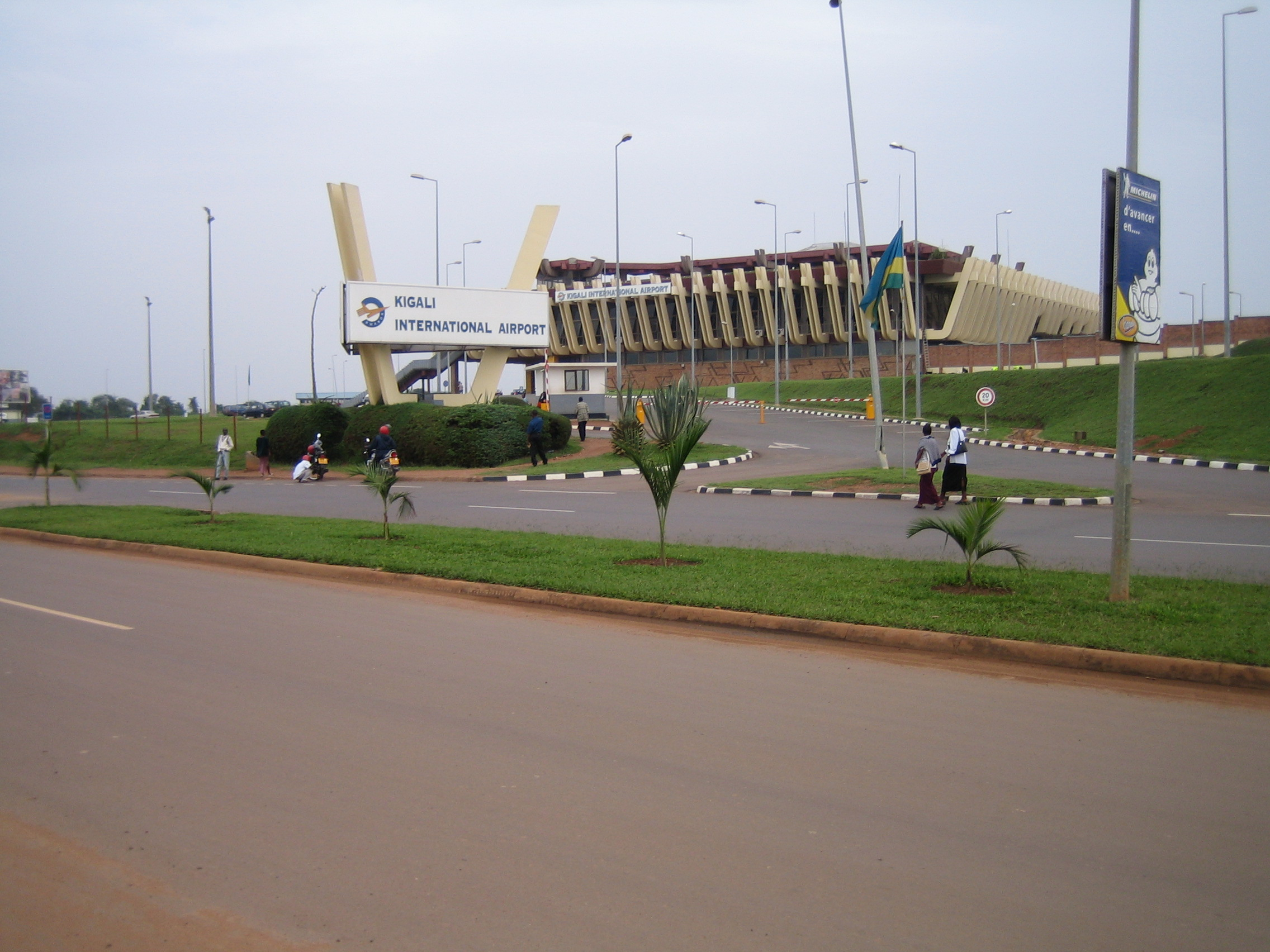
- IATA: KGL; ICAO: HRYR

Summary
- Airport type: Public
- Operator: Rwanda Airports Company
- Serves: Kigali
- Location: Kigali, Rwanda
- Hub for: RwandAir
- Elevation AMSL: 1,488 m (4,882 ft)
- Coordinates: 01°58′06.41″S 030°08′18.19″E
- Website: rac.co.rw

Maps
- Location within Rwanda KGL (Africa)
- Interactive map of Kigali International Airport

Runways
| Direction | Length | | Surface |
| Direction | m | ft | Surface |
|---|---|---|---|
| 10/28 | 3,500 | 11,482 | Asphalt |

Statistics (2019)
- Passengers: 1.2 million
- Aerodrome data from Rwanda eAIP.

Kigali International Airport (IATA: KGL, ICAO: HRYR), formerly known as Grégoire Kayibanda International Airport named after Rwanda's first elected president, is the primary international airport serving Kigali, the capital of Rwanda. There are 4 airlines based at Kigali Airport: RwandAir, the flag carrier airline of Rwanda; Akagera Aviation, a Rwandan helicopter airline; Tempus Jet, an American airline providing charter flights; and Nexus Aero, a Saudi VIP airline.

== Location ==
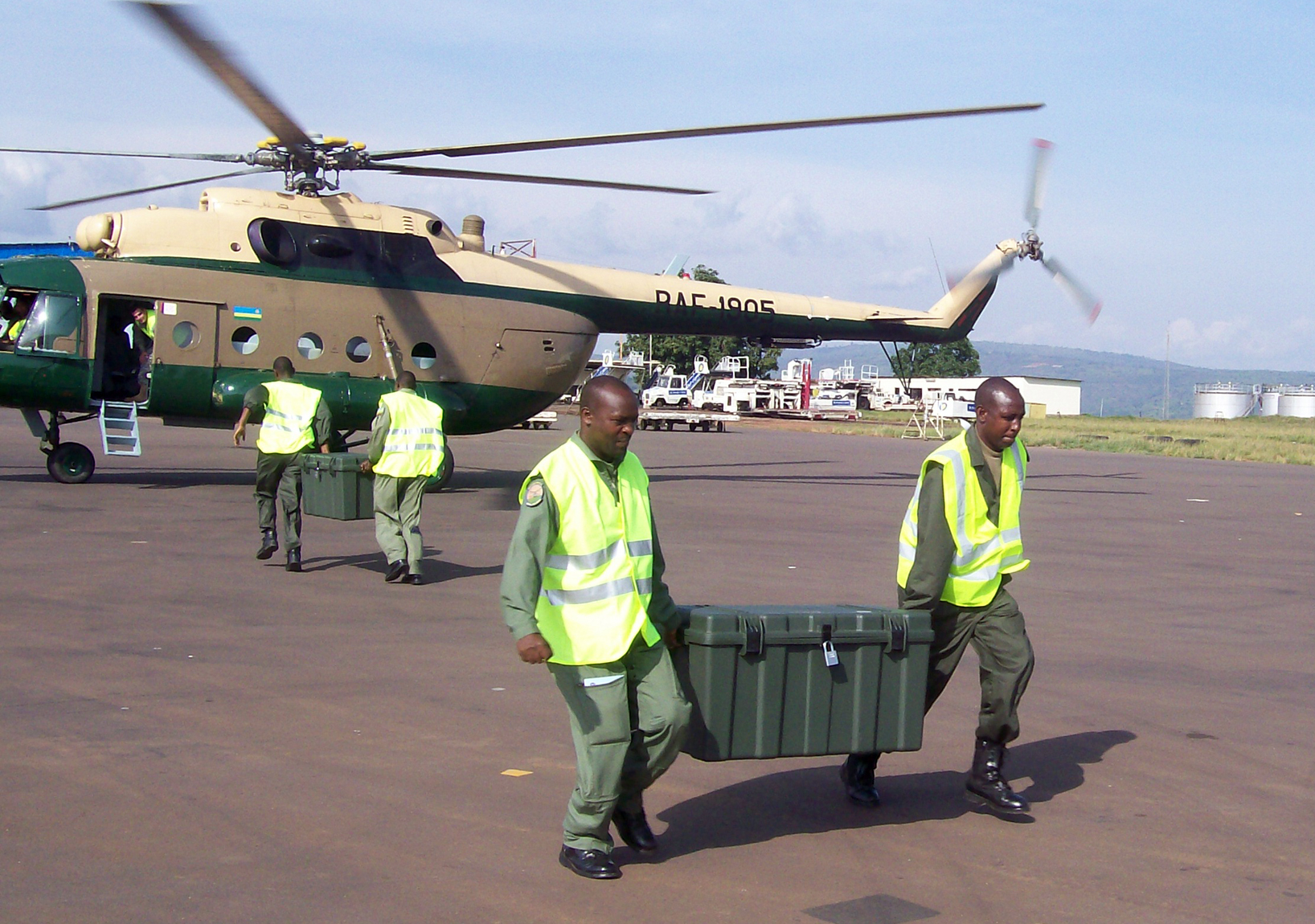
Mil Mi-17 Rwanda Air Force - Darfur support, U.S. Army Africa, Kigali, Rwanda 090114

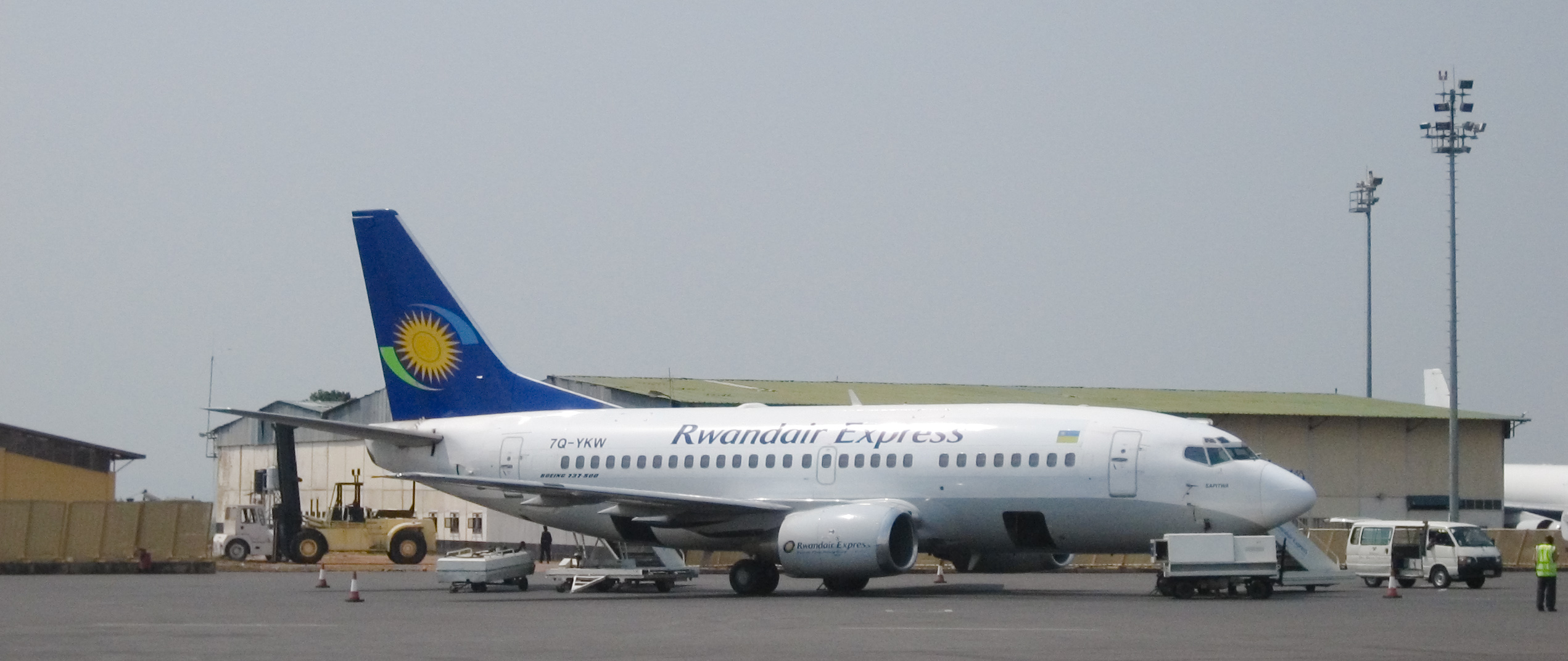
Rwandair Express Aircraft at Kigali airport

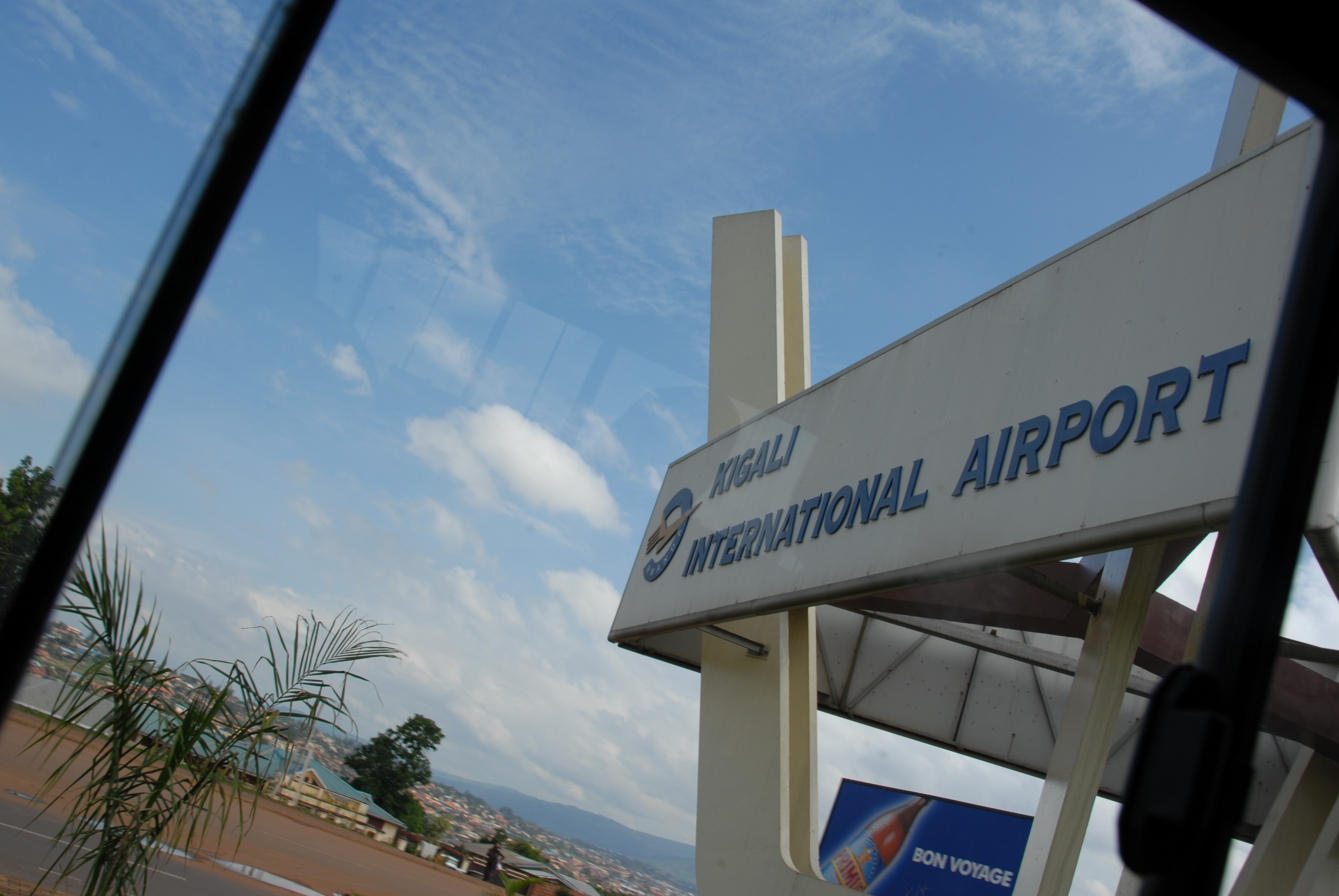
Kigali International Airport

The airport is located in the suburb of Kanombe Sector, at the eastern edge of Kigali, approximately 5 kilometres (3.1 mi), by road, east of the central business district of the city of Kigali.

== History ==
The airport dates back to the Belgian colonial administration of Ruanda-Urundi. According to Rwandan historian Bernardin Muzungu, the first aircraft landed at Kanombe airport in Kigali in 1934. After Rwanda's independence in 1962, the airport was upgraded and renamed Grégoire Kayibanda International Airport, after Rwanda's first president. It is also commonly referred to as Kanombe Airport, after its location in the Kanombe area of eastern Kigali.

During the Rwandan Civil War, the airport was a strategic site because of its role as Rwanda's main international airport and its proximity to the Kanombe military camp and the then presidential residence. On 6 April 1994, the aircraft carrying Rwandan president Juvénal Habyarimana and Burundian president Cyprien Ntaryamira was shot down while on final approach to runway 28 at the airport, killing all 12 people on board. The assassination triggered a renewed outbreak of the civil war and the beginning of the genocide against the Tutsi.

After the genocide, the airport continued to operate as Rwanda's principal international airport and was renamed Kigali International Airport. It is the hub for RwandAir.

Between 2014 and 2017, over US$30 million was invested in upgrades, including a new apron, three taxiways, a hangar, and an upgrade of airfield lighting. A further phase of expansion began in September 2019 in preparation for the 2022 Commonwealth Heads of Government Meeting in Kigali, including a new 53,000 m² apron with capacity for 18 aircraft, an arrivals terminal, runway strip grading, and a 3.3 km service road.

== Passenger traffic ==
In 2008, the airport served 145,189 passengers, and about 290,000 passengers in 2010. In May 2011, the Rwanda CAA announced that Kigali airport will be upgraded to meet the strong demand. Works started in October 2012 and will be completed in May 2014. In 2012, data from Rwanda Civil Aviation Authority shows that passenger traffic through Kigali International Airport grew by 30 per cent to 488,903 last year, up from 377,327 in 2011. The airport handled over 300 flights a week. The airport is designed to handle 400,000 passengers per year. International and domestic passenger numbers were nearly 600,000 in 2013, while there were about 400 weekly flights. International and domestic passenger numbers totaled 710,000 in 2016.

== Facilities ==
There are three terminals at Kigali. The main two-story terminal was built to replace the single-story building, now housing the VIP terminal. The main terminal can handle 6 small-to-midsized aircraft, but also up to a Boeing 747 jet. The south side of the runway has two helicopter pads with access to the main runway, used by military helicopters. A cargo terminal is also located at the airport. The latest upgrades to tarmac and support systems were made in 2002. There is free Wi-Fi in the airport waiting area. In 2014, Kigali Airport ranked as the seventh-best regional airport in Africa, because of its capacity to respond to disaster, through its fire department (Category Nine), the second-best according to International Aviation Organisation standards.

Rwandair has its head office on the top floor of the airport main building. The airline previously had its head office in Centenary House in Kigali. The airline began moving its operations from Centenary House to the airport on Friday 14 May 2010. The airline was scheduled to be moved in by Monday 17 May 2010.

In addition, Akagera Aviation, Akagera Aviation School, and the Rwanda Civil Aviation Authority have their offices or are headquartered at the airport.

== New Kigali (Bugesera) International Airport ==
In September 2016, a contract between the Rwandan government and Mota-Engil Engenharia e Construção África, S.A., a Portuguese firm, was signed. The company will construct the airport in two phases with works on the first phase now scheduled to begin in June 2017. After finishing the first phase by December 2018, Mota-Engil Engenharia e Construção África, S.A. will subsequently operate the airport for 25 years. The airport will have a capacity of 1.7 million passengers per year. A second phase that is planned to be built after that is supposed to raise the capacity of the airport to 4.5 million passengers per year. Mota-Engil Engenharia e Construção África, S.A. will cover the costs of US$418 million for the first phase and US$400 million for the second phase, leading to a total investment of US$818 million. As compensation, the company has the right to keep the profits from operating the airport. Under the agreement, the Rwandan government won't have to contribute to the costs of construction and operation.

In March 2019, the government confirmed that some works were temporarily put on hold in order for a redesign to take place. The redesign will ensure that the airport is up to international standards.

In December 2019, Qatar's state-owned airline, Qatar Airways, collaborated with the Rwanda Development Board to purchase a 60% stake in the Bugesera International Airport. Infrastructure minister Claver Gatete said, “We are looking for a bigger sized airport. That's why we are looking for a bigger investor.”

== Airlines and destinations ==
=== Passenger ===
As of October 2026, there is direct passenger traffic from Kigali to the following destinations:

| Airlines | Destinations |
|---|---|
| Badr Airlines | Juba |
| Brussels Airlines | Brussels |
| Egyptair | Cairo |
| Ethiopian Airlines | Addis Ababa |
| Kenya Airways | Nairobi–Jomo Kenyatta |
| KLM | Amsterdam, Entebbe |
| Qatar Airways | Doha |
| RwandAir | Accra, Bangui, Bujumbura, Dar Es Salaam, Doha, Douala, Dubai–International, Entebbe, Johannesburg–O. R. Tambo, Kamembe, Kilimanjaro, Lagos, London–Heathrow, Lusaka, Nairobi–Jomo Kenyatta, Paris–Charles de Gaulle, Zanzibar |
| SalamAir | Muscat |
| Turkish Airlines | Istanbul, Entebbe |
| Uganda Airlines | Entebbe (begins 18 November 2026) |

=== Cargo ===
| Airlines | Destinations |
|---|---|
| Astral Aviation | Nairobi–Jomo Kenyatta |
| Ethiopian Airlines Cargo | Addis Ababa |
| Qatar Airways Cargo | Nairobi–Jomo Kenyatta |
| Qatar Airways Cargo operated by ULS Airlines Cargo | Johannesburg–O.R. Tambo, Kano, Lagos |
| RwandAir Cargo | Nairobi–Jomo Kenyatta, Sharjah |

== Incidents and accidents ==
- 6 April 1994 – A Falcon 50 owned by and carrying then-president of Rwanda Juvenal Habyarimana was shot down while approaching the airport, killing all 12 aboard including Habyarimana and then-president of Burundi, Cyprien Ntaryamira, who were returning from a meeting to end the Rwandan civil war. The wreckage landed in front of the presidential palace. The attack was blamed on Tutsi rebels, and, as a result, within one hour of the crash Interahamwe militias began the Rwandan genocide. There is no consensus on who actually shot down or ordered the attack on the plane.
- 1 June 2004 – An Antonov 32 owned by Sun Air (9XR-SN), reportedly suffered some problems with the left main undercarriage after takeoff from Beni, Democratic Republic of the Congo. The airplane was headed for Goma, but diverted to Kigali for an emergency landing. The aircraft crashed on landing, causing the Russian pilots and Congolese passengers to sustain serious injuries. The An-32 involved in the accident had been detained in Goma mid-July 2003 because it carried a shipment of armaments destined for a Rwanda-backed militia in the Congolese Kasai region.
- 12 November 2009, RwandAir Flight 205, a Bombardier CRJ-100 crashed into a VIP terminal shortly after an emergency landing; out of the 10 passengers and 5 crew, 1 passenger died.
