= RwandAir =

Flag carrier of Rwanda

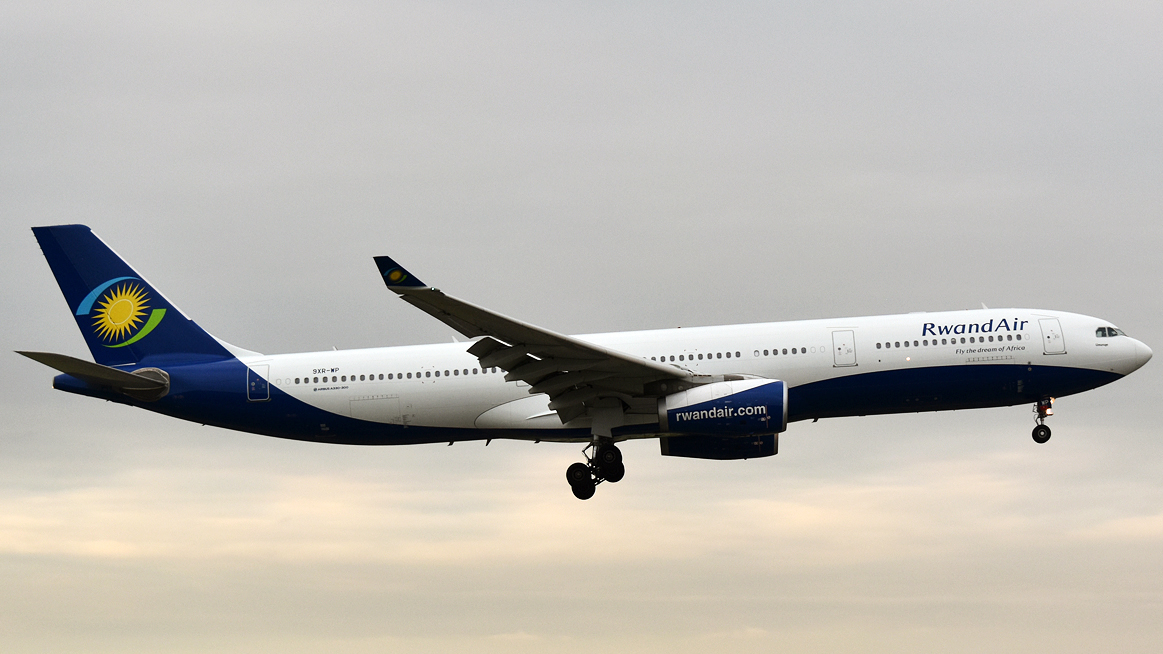
- RwandAir Airbus A330-300
| IATA | ICAO | Call sign |
|---|---|---|
| WB | RWD | RWANDAIR |
- Founded: 1 December 2002; 23 years ago
- Commenced operations: 27 April 2003; 23 years ago
- Operating bases: Kigali International Airport; Cadjehoun Airport; Accra International Airport
- Fleet size: 17
- Destinations: 25
- Parent company: Government of Rwanda
- Headquarters: Kigali, Rwanda
- Key people: Godfrey Kabera, chairman; Yvonne Manzi Makolo, CEO
- Website: rwandair.com

RwandAir Limited is the national flag carrier airline of Rwanda, headquartered in Kigali and operating from its primary hub at Kigali International Airport. The airline operates flights 25 destinations across various regions, including East Africa, Central Africa, West Africa, Southern Africa, Europe, the Middle East, and Asia.

Within Africa, RwandAir connects major cities in South Africa, Nigeria, Tanzania, Kenya, and Ghana, among others. Internationally, it serves long-haul routes to destinations such as Brussels, London, Paris, Dubai, Doha, and Mumbai. Through its expanding network, RwandAir continues to strengthen Rwanda's connectivity with regional and global markets.

== History ==
=== Incorporation ===
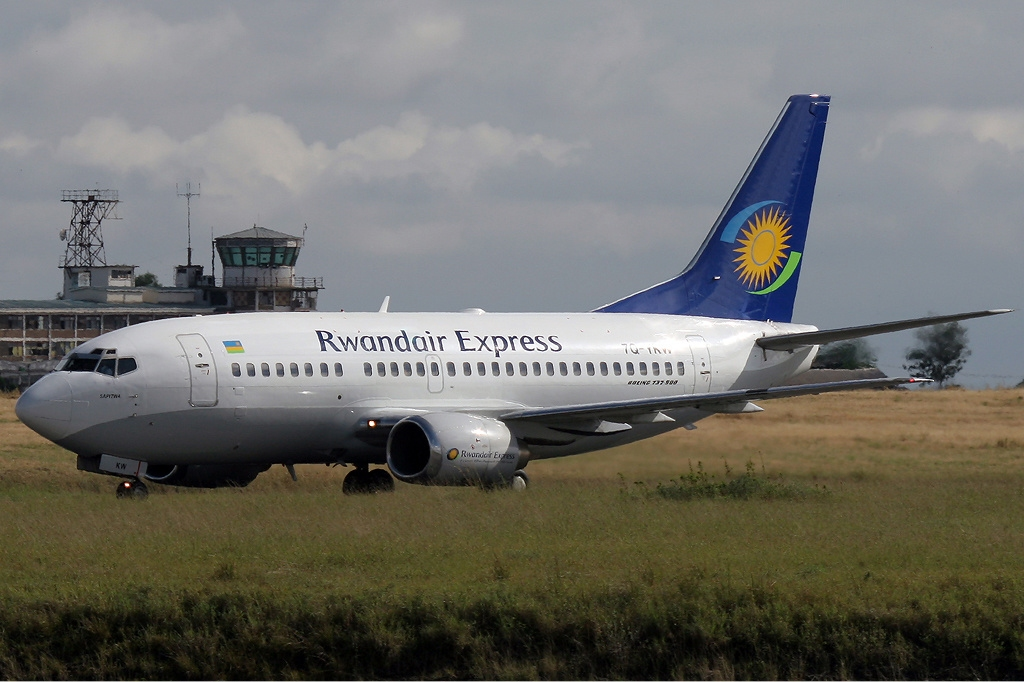
A former Rwandair Express Boeing 737-500

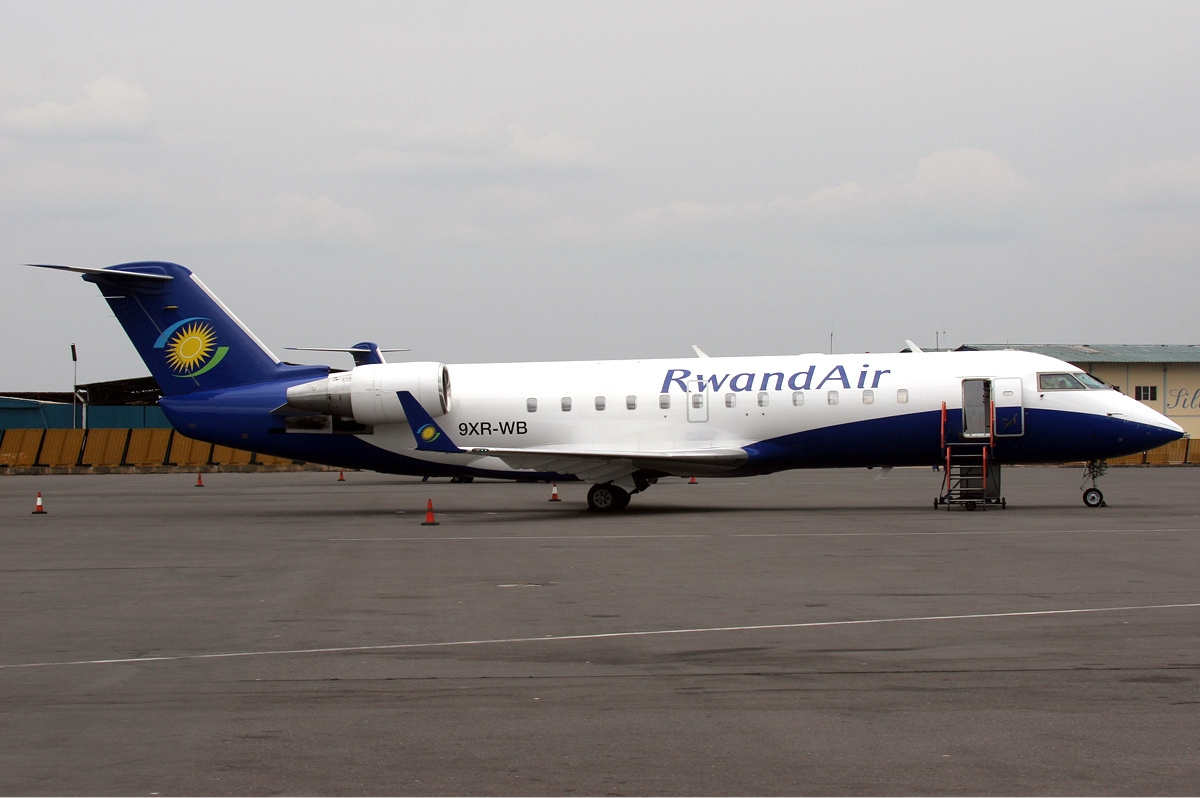
A former RwandAir Bombardier CRJ200LR

After the 1994 genocide, the government took several attempts to revive the former national carrier Air Rwanda that ceased operations during the genocide. Various private companies showed interest in partnering with the government, and Uganda-based SA Alliance Air ran the company from 1997 to 2000. After SA Alliance ceased operations, the government of Rwanda took over the Rwandan operations and re-branded the airline, to ensure its continuity. RwandAir began operations on 1 December 2002 as the new national carrier for Rwanda under the name Rwandair Express (with passenger air transportation as the core activity). In 2016, RwandAir received International Air Transport Association's Safety Audit for Ground Operations (ISAGO).

=== Re-branding ===
The airline began to expand regionally and by 2009 the network included Dar-es-Salaam, Nairobi, and domestic destinations such as Gisenyi. In March 2009, the airline registered the new trademark RwandAir Limited, which is its current operating name. In June 2009, the airline officially re-branded from Rwandair Express to RwandAir, because the new name implied a large, serious airline, while the "Express" in the former name implied a small regional operation.

In May 2010, Rene Janata became the CEO, introducing a frequent flyer program and developing the airline to become a network carrier. In October 2010, John Mirenge became the new CEO of RwandAir.

=== 2010–2015 ===
In July 2010, the first of RwandAir's new Boeing 737-500s arrived. The second one arrived on 20 October 2010. Both were leased from General Electric Capital Aviation Services (GECAS). Each has a two-class configuration with 12 business class seats and 90 economy class seats.

In August 2011, the airline took delivery of their first aircraft purchased directly from an airline manufacturer. All prior aircraft operated by RwandAir had been either leased or bought as a second-hand aircraft. The aircraft that was purchased is a Boeing 737-800 with Sky Interior, also known as the Boeing 737 Next Generation, and was the only one operating among African airlines.

In October 2011, RwandAir took delivery of their second Boeing Next Generation 737-800. During January 2012, the airline disposed of the two CRJ200 aircraft it owned, in anticipation of acquiring two CRJ-900NGs.

In February 2013, John Mirenge announced that the airline would fly to Accra, Cape Town, Harare, Juba, and Zanzibar.

In May 2015, RwandAir officially became an IATA member.

=== 2015–present ===
In 2017, the Government of Benin granted RwandAir seventh freedom rights to operate direct flights from Benin. RwandAir plans to base two Boeing 737 aircraft at Cotonou International Airport in Benin.

In February 2020, two months after Qatar Airways purchased a 60 percent stake in Rwanda's Bugesera International Airport, the Qatari state-owned airline purchased a 49 percent stake in RwandAir.

In 2019, RwandAir entered into a partnership with USA-based Optiontown to launch a prepaid flight subscription platform called Flight Pass, which enables customers to pre-purchase RwandAir flights at the best available price and decide when they want to travel at a later date.

In September 2022, the airline's intentions in joining Oneworld, with a sponsorship from Qatar Airways, were announced. This would make RwandAir the third airline to enter an airline alliance in East Africa, after Ethiopian Airlines (Star Alliance) and Kenya Airways (SkyTeam), and second African airline after Royal Air Maroc to join Oneworld.

== Corporate affairs ==
=== Ownership and management ===
Rwandair is owned 100 percent by the Government of Rwanda. As of May 2021, an agreement to sell a 49 percent stake to Qatar Airways is said to be in the final stages.

The government hoped to privatise the airline after 2013, once it became profitable. However, the process had been abandoned in 2008 after it emerged that nobody at the time was willing to offer the amount expected from the sale.

RwandAir's board of directors is responsible for ensuring that the airline follows a suitable corporate governance framework to ensure the creation and protection of value for the shareholder. Patricie Uwase is currently the chairman of RwandAir since September 2021; the long-time aviation veteran Girma Wake was chairman from 2012 to 2017. Yvonne Manzi Makolo is the current CEO, having been promoted from deputy CEO in charge of Corporate Affairs in April 2018. She replaced acting CEO Col. Chance Ndagano.

=== Business trends ===
RwandAir has been loss-making for many years.

Full detailed accounts are rarely published, although intermittently some figures are made public by senior management or the government, or in government budgetary reports. Available trends are shown below (as at year ending 31 December):

| | 2010 | 2011 | 2012 | 2013 | 2014 | 2015 | 2016 | 2017 | 2018 | 2019 |
|---|---|---|---|---|---|---|---|---|---|---|
| Turnover (FRw bn) | | | 30 | | | | | | | |
| Turnover (US$ m) | | | 47.2 | | 81.4 | 95.3 | 99.9 | 126.0 | 171.3 | 221.6 |
| Net profit before tax and grant (FRw bn) | loss | loss | loss | loss | loss | loss | loss | loss | loss | loss |
| Net profit before tax and grant (US$ m) | loss | loss | loss | loss | 65.9 | 53.4 | 54.8 | 101.4 | 170.7 | 166.7 |
| Government grant/subsidy received (FRw bn) | 10.8 | 25.2 | 22.0 | 27.0 | 29.1 | 33.6 | 49.6 | 86.3 | 107.0 | 127.9 |
| Government grant/subsidy received (US$ m) | | | | 54.2 | 28.5 | 56.3 | 53.8 | 98.1 | 111.1 | 143.2 |
| Number of employees (at year end) | | | | 749 | | | | 1360 | 1367 | 1692 |
| Number of passengers (m) | 0.13 | 0.20 | 0.36 | 0.41 | 0.50 | 0.60 | 0.59 | 0.89 | 1.14 | 1.17 |
| Passenger load factor (%) | | | | | | 60 | 59 | 54 | 59 | 63 |
| Number of aircraft (at year end) | | 8 | 8 | 8 | 8 | 8 | 12 | 12 | 12 | 12 |
| Notes/sources | | | | | | | > | | | |

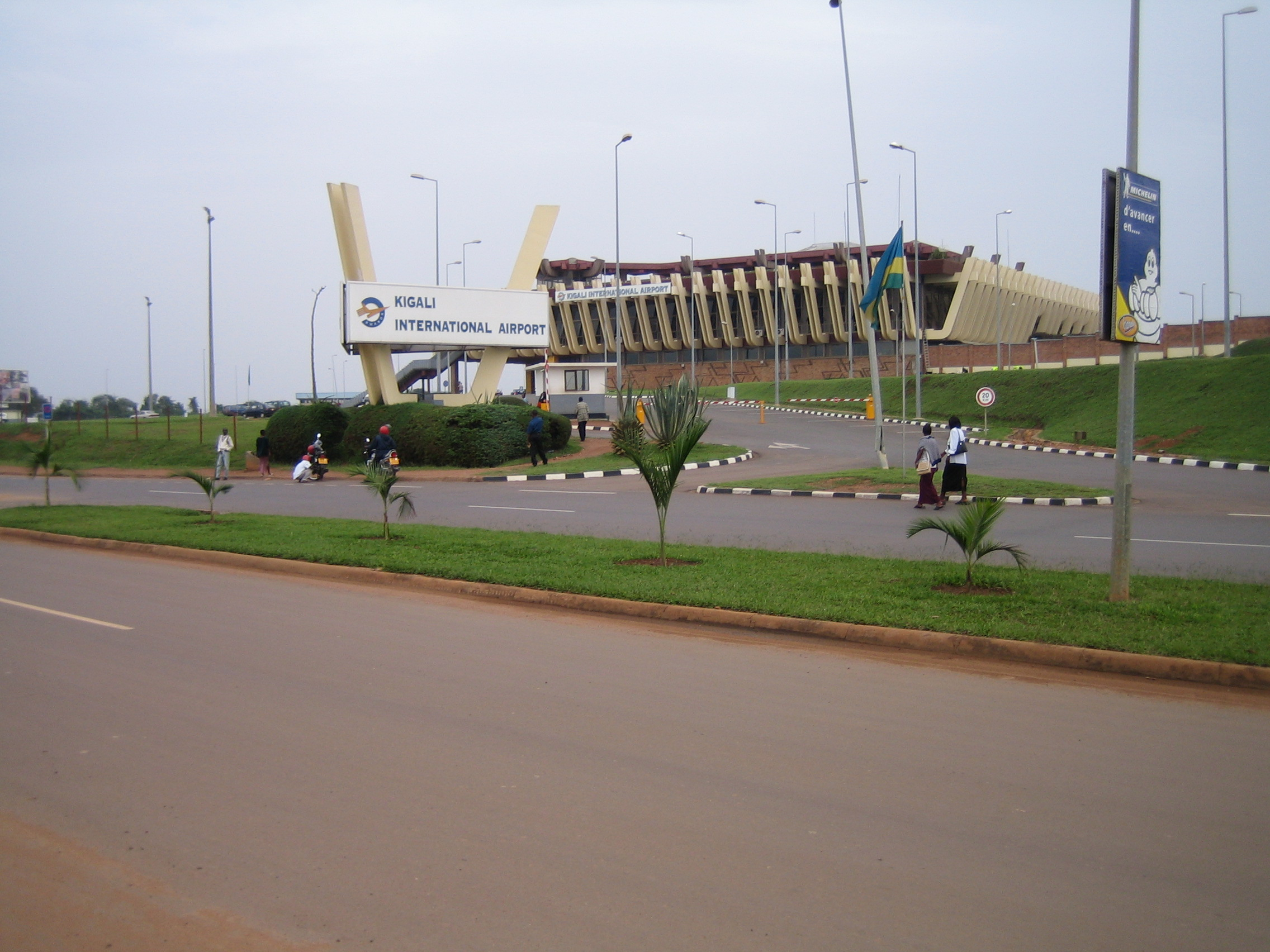
The head office is in the main building of Kigali International Airport.

=== Head office ===
The airline has its head office on the top floor of the main building of Kigali International Airport in Kigali, Rwanda. The airline previously had its head office in Centenary House in Kigali. The airline began moving its operations from Centenary House to the airport on Friday 14 May 2010. The airline was scheduled to be moved in by Monday 17 May 2010. Previously, the airline had its head office in the Telcom House.

== Destinations ==
As of December 2024, the airline serves 21 countries on 35 routes.

RwandAir serves the following destinations as of May 2023:

| Country | City | Airport | Notes | Refs |
|---|---|---|---|---|
| Belgium | Brussels | Brussels Airport | | |
| Benin | Cotonou | Cadjehoun Airport | Hub | |
| Burundi | Bujumbura | Bujumbura International Airport | | |
| Cameroon | Douala | Douala International Airport | | |
| China | Guangzhou | Guangzhou Baiyun International Airport | Terminated | |
| Democratic Republic of the Congo | Kinshasa | N'djili Airport | | |
| Ethiopia | Addis Ababa | Addis Ababa Bole International Airport | | |
| France | Paris | Charles de Gaulle Airport | | |
| Gabon | Libreville | Léon-Mba International Airport | | |
| Ghana | Accra | Accra International Airport | | |
| Guinea | Conakry | Ahmed Sékou Touré International Airport | | |
| India | Mumbai | Chhatrapati Shivaji Maharaj International Airport | Terminated | |
| Israel | Tel Aviv | Ben Gurion Airport | Suspended | |
| Ivory Coast | Abidjan | Félix-Houphouët-Boigny International Airport | | |
| Kenya | Mombasa | Moi International Airport | | |
| Kenya | Nairobi | Jomo Kenyatta International Airport | | |
| Mali | Bamako | Bamako–Sénou International Airport | | |
| Nigeria | Abuja | Nnamdi Azikiwe International Airport | | |
| Nigeria | Lagos | Murtala Muhammed International Airport | | |
| Qatar | Doha | Hamad International Airport | | |
| Republic of the Congo | Brazzaville | Maya-Maya Airport | | |
| Rwanda | Bugesera | Bugesera International Airport | Future | |
| Rwanda | Cyangugu | Kamembe Airport | | |
| Rwanda | Kigali | Kigali International Airport | Hub | |
| Senegal | Dakar | Blaise Diagne International Airport | | |
| Senegal | Dakar | Léopold Sédar Senghor International Airport | Terminated | |
| South Africa | Cape Town | Cape Town International Airport | Terminated | |
| South Africa | Johannesburg | O. R. Tambo International Airport | | |
| South Sudan | Juba | Juba International Airport | | |
| Tanzania | Dar es Salaam | Julius Nyerere International Airport | | |
| Tanzania | Kilimanjaro | Kilimanjaro International Airport | | |
| Uganda | Entebbe | Entebbe International Airport | | |
| United Arab Emirates | Dubai | Dubai International Airport | | |
| United Kingdom | London | Gatwick Airport | Terminated | |
| United Kingdom | London | Heathrow Airport | | |
| Zambia | Lusaka | Kenneth Kaunda International Airport | | |
| Zimbabwe | Harare | Robert Gabriel Mugabe International Airport | | |

=== Codeshare agreements ===
RwandAir codeshares with the following airlines:

- Brussels Airlines
- Ethiopian Airlines
- Qatar Airways
- South African Airways
- Turkish Airlines
- Westair Aviation

=== Interline agreements ===
- APG Airlines
- Emirates

== Fleet ==
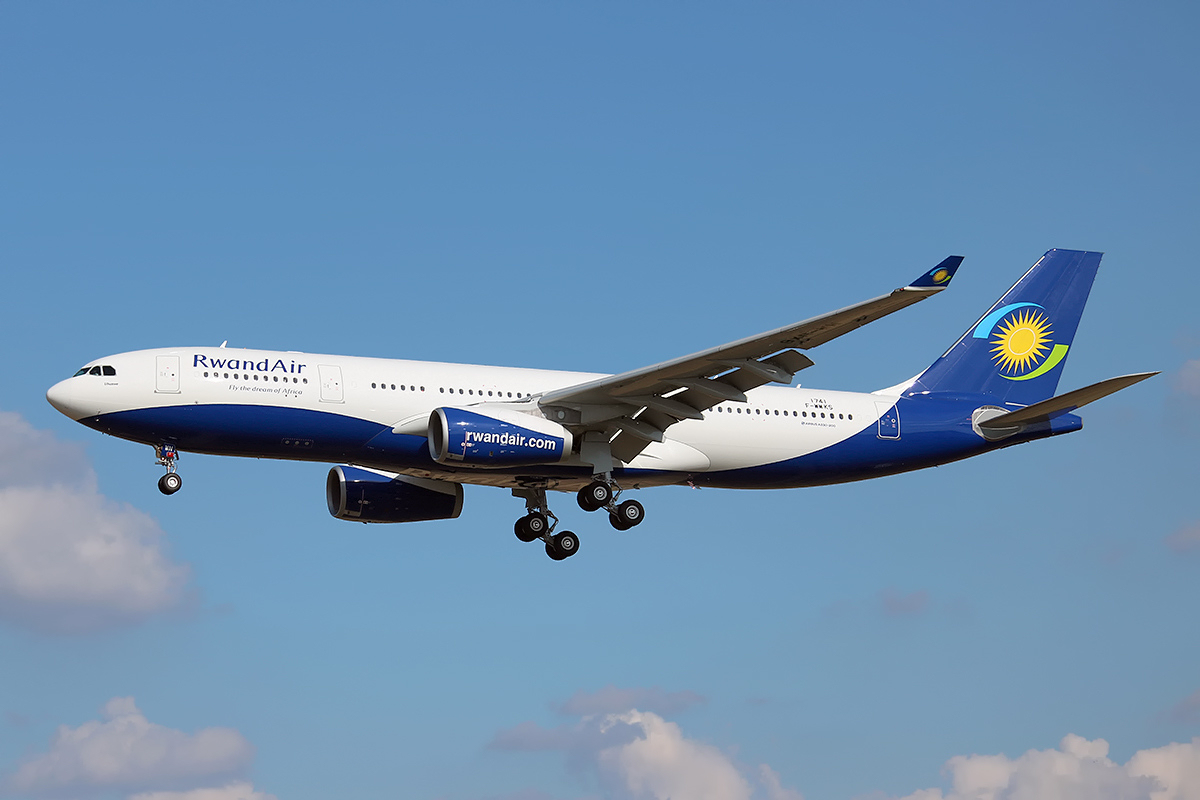
A RwandAir Airbus A330-200

As of August 2026, RwandAir operates the following aircraft:

RwandAir fleet
| Aircraft | In service | Orders | Passengers | | | | Notes |
| Aircraft | In service | Orders | C | Y+ | Y | Total | Notes |
|---|---|---|---|---|---|---|---|
| Airbus A330-200 | 3 | — | 20 | 21 | 203 | 244 | |
| Airbus A330-300 | 1 | — | 30 | 21 | 223 | 274 | |
| Boeing 737-700 | 1 | — | 12 | – | 108 | 120 | To be retired. |
| Boeing 737-800 | 7 | — | 16 | – | 138 | 154 | |
| Bombardier CRJ900ER | 2 | — | 7 | – | 68 | 75 | To be retired. |
| Bombardier Dash 8 | 2 | — | 7 | – | 60 | 67 | |
RwandAir Cargo fleet
| Boeing 737-800BCF | 1 | 1 | Cargo | | | | |
| Total | 17 | 1 | | | | | |
