= List of airports in Rwanda =

This is a list of airports in Rwanda, sorted by location.

== List ==
Airport names shown in bold have scheduled commercial airline service.

City served	Province	ICAO	IATA	Airport name	Coordinates
Nyamata	Eastern Province	n/a	n/a	Bugesera International Airport	02°10′30″S 030°09′00″E
Butare	Southern Province	HRYI	BTQ	Butare Airport	02°35′42″S 029°44′24″E
Cyangugu	Western Province	HRZA	KME	**Kamembe International Airport**	02°27′44″S 028°54′29″E
Gisenyi	Western Province	HRYG	GYI	Gisenyi Airport	01°40′38″S 029°15′32″E
Kigali	City of Kigali	HRYR	KGL	**Kigali International Airport** (formerly "Gregoire Kayibanda Airport")	01°58′07″S 030°08′22″E
Nemba	Eastern Province	HRYN	n/a	Nemba Airport	02°19′48″S 030°12′00″E
Ruhengeri	Northern Province	HRYU	RHG	Ruhengeri Airport	01°30′00″S 029°38′01″E

== See also ==
- Transport in Rwanda
- Rwandan Air Force
- List of airports by ICAO code: H#HR - Rwanda
- Wikipedia: WikiProject Aviation/Airline destination lists: Africa#Rwanda
