= Digital repatriation of Rwandan sound archives =

Transfer of digitised Rwandan musical recordings from Belgium

The digital repatriation of Rwandan sound archives involved the transfer of digital copies of more than 4,000 recordings of Rwandan musical traditions from the Royal Museum for Central Africa, also known as AfricaMuseum, in Belgium to the Rwanda Cultural Heritage Academy. The handover took place on 28 October 2021 at the Rwanda Art Museum in Kigali, following discussions between Rwandan and Belgian institutions that began in 2018. The recordings were made during and after Belgian rule, document royal, ritual, agricultural and dance music. The transfer provided copies rather than the return of the original recordings. The RCHA director-general described it as a donation between institutions and distinguished it from full restitution.

The transfer formed part of SHARE, a bilateral programme supporting access to heritage, research and training in conservation and collection management. The recordings document musical traditions from Rwanda's colonial and post-independence periods. Subsequent activities included workshops, exhibitions and collaborations with Rwandan musicians, although access to the collection remained subject to institutional selection and restrictions.

== Background ==
=== Historical recordings ===
Starting in the late 1950s, the Royal Museum for Central Africa assembled a collection of Rwandan musical recordings through research conducted during and after Belgian colonial rule. Later fieldwork included collaboration between the museum and the defunct Rwanda's Institut national de recherche scientifique (INRS). The transferred collection includes royal court music, ritual songs, dance music and songs associated with agriculture, cattle, hunting and celebrations. It contains performances by musicians including Rujindiri and Sebatunzi. The recordings were accompanied by information identifying performers, recording dates and locations, and the functions of the music. AfricaMuseum describes the transferred material as dating from the 1950s to the 1990s, while RCHA director-general Robert Masozera described a collection extending to 2007.

== Negotiations and institutional cooperation ==
=== Rwandan requests for access ===
In March 2018, Rwanda's Ministry of Sports and Culture convened a consultation involving experts, archivists and librarians on access to archives held in Belgium. AfricaMuseum director-general Guido Gryseels announced a commitment to digitise and share relevant records. Rwanda's Minister of Sports and Culture, Julienne Uwacu, welcomed the proposed return. These discussions concerned a wider body of Rwandan historical material, including administrative documents, photographs and ethnographic collections. Some records required consideration of personal privacy before disclosure. In April 2020, acting national archives director Marie Claude Uwineza reported that a Rwandan team had been identifying documents to prioritise for digitisation.

=== SHARE programme ===
The SHARE programmes was funded by Belgium's Directorate-General for Development Cooperation and Humanitarian Aid. It ran from 2019–2023. At Rwanda's request, AfricaMuseum, the State Archives of Belgium and the Belgian Ministry of Foreign Affairs participated in inventorying and digitising archives concerning Rwanda. The programme also supported cooperation with the Ethnographic Museum in Huye and research into music and the Kinyarwanda language. Implementation of the sound-archive project was delayed by the COVID-19 pandemic, with activities proceeding in 2021. Cooperation included training in audiovisual documentation and the creation of new recordings alongside the sharing of historical material.

== October 2021 handover ==
The handover took place at the Rwanda Art Museum on 28 October 2021. Belgian ambassador Bert Versmessen presented a disc containing the recordings to Robert Masozera, director-general of the Rwanda Cultural Heritage Academy. The digital files were accompanied by an inventory describing their titles, recording locations and musical or ritual functions. AfricaMuseum ethnomusicologist Rémy Jadinon participated in the transfer and the associated musicological cooperation. Masozera announced that the recordings would be archived at the Ethnographic Museum in Huye and made available for educational and public use. In a subsequent interview, Masozera distinguished the provision of digital copies from the full restitution of Rwandan heritage held in Belgium. He described the handover as a donation between institutions and stated that wider restitution requests were being pursued through diplomatic channels.

== Community participation and cultural reuse ==
=== Musicians' responses ===
Rwandan musicians welcomed the prospect of using the recordings to study and reinterpret traditional music. Ibrahim Cyusa described them as a source of inspiration for contemporary traditional musicians, while Yvan Buravan emphasised their potential to help performers trace the history of Rwandan music. Musician and producer Michael Makembe performed at the handover and advocated using historical recordings to develop contemporary musical styles rooted in Rwandan traditions.

=== Workshops, exhibitions and new recordings ===
In 2022, the Rwanda Cultural Heritage Academy worked with the University of Global Health Equity and Hamwe Festival to prepare an exhibition and discussions about the archives. Rwanda Art Museum manager Vivaldi Ngenzi described the initiative as a way to improve access and introduce musicians to historical sources for their work. A workshop at the Institut Français was announced for 5 May 2022, with Makembe among the participants. The SHARE programme also documented contemporary performers, including inanga player Deo Munyakazi, the Urugangazi dance troupe from Huye and indigidi player Manuel Ndayizenga. In 2023, an exhibition on musical traditions in Kigali made approximately 60 recordings available for listening. A larger selection of approximately 1,700 recordings was intended for publication on the academy's website. The Urugangazi troupe contributed musical instruments and costumes to the exhibition, while associated youth heritage activities supported engagement with the returned material.

== Access and restitution debates ==
=== Public access and historical classification ===
The transfer to a Rwandan institution did not immediately make the entire collection publicly accessible. A study published in Gradhiva reported that the academy required selection before release because recordings and their documentation contained ethnic classifications, including references to Hutu and Tutsi. It described continuing requests for access from artists and educational institutions, with only a limited number of artists able to consult or reinterpret the recordings. The study identified a tension between preserving historical documentation and addressing classifications associated with Rwanda's history of ethnic division. It argued that dissemination required critical interpretation of the accompanying information rather than simply reproducing or deleting it.

The 2021 handover preceded Belgium's law of 3 July 2022 establishing a framework for the restitution of certain cultural property linked to the Belgian colonial past. The legislation excluded archives and human remains from its scope.

== See also ==
- Music of Rwanda
- Royal Museum for Central Africa
- Repatriation (cultural property)
