= King's Palace Museum Rukari =

Museum in Nyanza, Rwanda

- Ingoro y'umwami mu Rukari
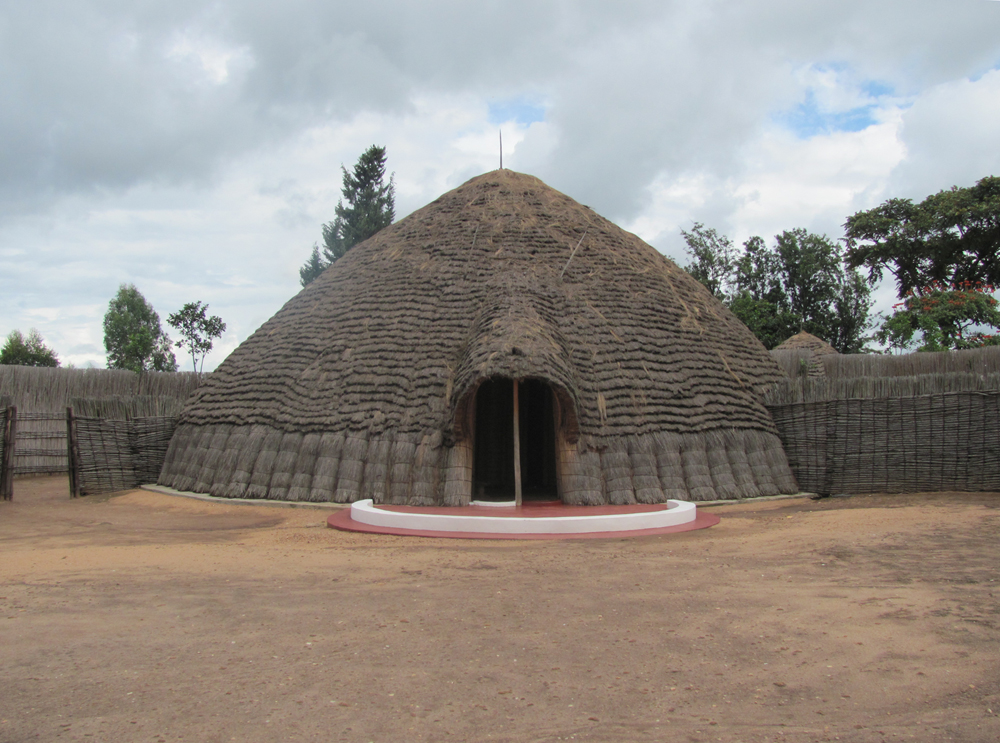
- The traditional royal palace at the museum site in Nyanza
- Established: 2008
- Location: Nyanza, Rwanda
- Coordinates: 2.361°S 29.740°E
- Type: History museum
- Owner: Rwanda Cultural Heritage Academy
- Website: www.rwandaheritage.gov.rw

The King's Palace Museum Rukari is a museum in Rwanda located in the town of Nyanza, established within the former palace complex of King Mutara III Rudahigwa. The site served as the seat of Rwandan kings and preserves both a reconstructed traditional royal residence and a modern palace built in 1930–1933. The museum is noted for its herd of long-horned Inyambo cattle, a living symbol of Rwandan royal culture, and for the Mwima mausoleum on an adjacent hill where successive kings and their consorts are interred.

Inaugurated in May 2008, the museum is administered by the Rwanda Cultural Heritage Academy (RCHA), a public institution established in 2020 that merged the former Institute of National Museums of Rwanda with two other bodies.

== History and description ==
=== Traditional palace ===
The traditional palace of King Mutara III Rudahigwa offers a detailed overview of the Rwandan monarchical system. It has been reconstructed with traditional materials as it appeared in the 19th century and comprises three huts forming a beehive-shaped thatched dwelling. Royal long-horned cattle known as Inyambo (a prized variety descended from the wider Ankole breed) have been incorporated into the museum as they form an integral part of Rwandan culture and were one of the symbols of the king's prestige. The keepers of the herd carefully tend and sing to the cattle, maintaining a tradition associated with ceremonies held in honour of the king.

=== Modern palace ===
The palace complex, in which the museum is housed, was built in 1930–1933 on the hill of Rukari, overlooking the town of Nyanza. The palace was home to King Mutara III Rudahigwa and Queen Rosalie Gicanda, and holds an exhibition displaying Rwandan history from the 15th to the 20th century. The palace has numerous rooms for different functions: a sitting room, a dining room, and a cellar for storing drinks and other items. It faces another house that the king had just had built shortly before his death, on another hill.

=== Mausoleum ===
On the neighbouring hill of Mwima stands the mausoleum where King Mutara III Rudahigwa, his wife Queen Rosalie Gicanda (killed during the 1994 genocide) and King Kigeli V Ndahindurwa are interred. King Kigeli V Ndahindurwa was buried at the peak of Mwima hill on 15 January 2017, next to the tomb of his predecessor King Mutara III Rudahigwa, following the repatriation of his remains from the United States.

== See also ==
- List of museums in Rwanda
- Nyanza
- Mutara III Rudahigwa
- Rosalie Gicanda
- Kigeli V
