= List of museums in Rwanda =

This is a list of museums in Rwanda. As of 2026 there are currently 8 national museums.

== Museums in Rwanda ==
- Kandt House Museum
- Ethnographic Museum
- Museum for Campaign Against Genocide
- Rwanda Art Museum
- King's Palace Museum
- Museum of Environment
- Kwigira Museum
- Rwanda Liberation Museum

== See also ==
- List of museums
- Institute of National Museums of Rwanda
