= Ildéphonse Nizeyimana =

Rwandan soldier (born 1963)

- Born: October 5, 1963 (age 62); Gisenyi, Rwanda
- Date apprehended: October 6, 2009
- Military career
- Allegiance: Rwanda
- Branch: Rwandan Armed Forces (FAR)
- Conflicts: Rwandan Civil War

Ildéphonse Nizeyimana (born 5 October 1963) is a Rwandan soldier, who was convicted of his participation in the Rwandan genocide by the International Criminal Tribunal for Rwanda.

== Life ==
Nizeyimana was born in Gisenyi prefecture on 5 October 1963, in the same commune as President Juvénal Habyarimana. In 1994, he held the rank of captain in the Rwandan Armed Forces, and was the second-in-command, after Tharcisse Muvunyi, of the École des sous-officiers (ESO). He was convicted of ordering the execution of Queen Dowager Rosalie Gicanda at the beginning of the killings in Butare.

On November 27, 2000, the International Criminal Tribunal for Rwanda (ICTR) issued an indictment against Nizeyimana, charging him with "genocide, or in the alternative complicity in genocide, direct and public incitement to commit genocide, and crimes against humanity." Specifically, the indictment alleged that during the genocide, Nizeyimana had "instigated, encouraged, facilitated, or acquiesced to [...], the Interahamwe committing killings, kidnappings and the destruction of property." He was described as "one of [the] highest targets" of the ICTR.

On October 6, 2009, Nizeyimana was arrested in the Ugandan capital Kampala, apparently traveling from the Democratic Republic of the Congo to Kenya on false documents. The United States government had previously offered a reward of up to US$5 million for information leading to his arrest or conviction.

On September 29, 2014, the ICTR confirmed the conviction of Nizeyimana for genocide, war crimes and crimes against humanity for his personal involvement in the killings, including the killing of Queen Gicanda. They reduced his sentence from life imprisonment to 35 years.
