= GYI =

GYI may refer to:

- Gisenyi Airport, Rwanda
- Gyele language, spoken in Cameroon
- North Texas Regional Airport, United States
- Gyi, an honorific in Burmese names
  - Ant Gyi, Burmese singer
