= Rwanda Art Museum =

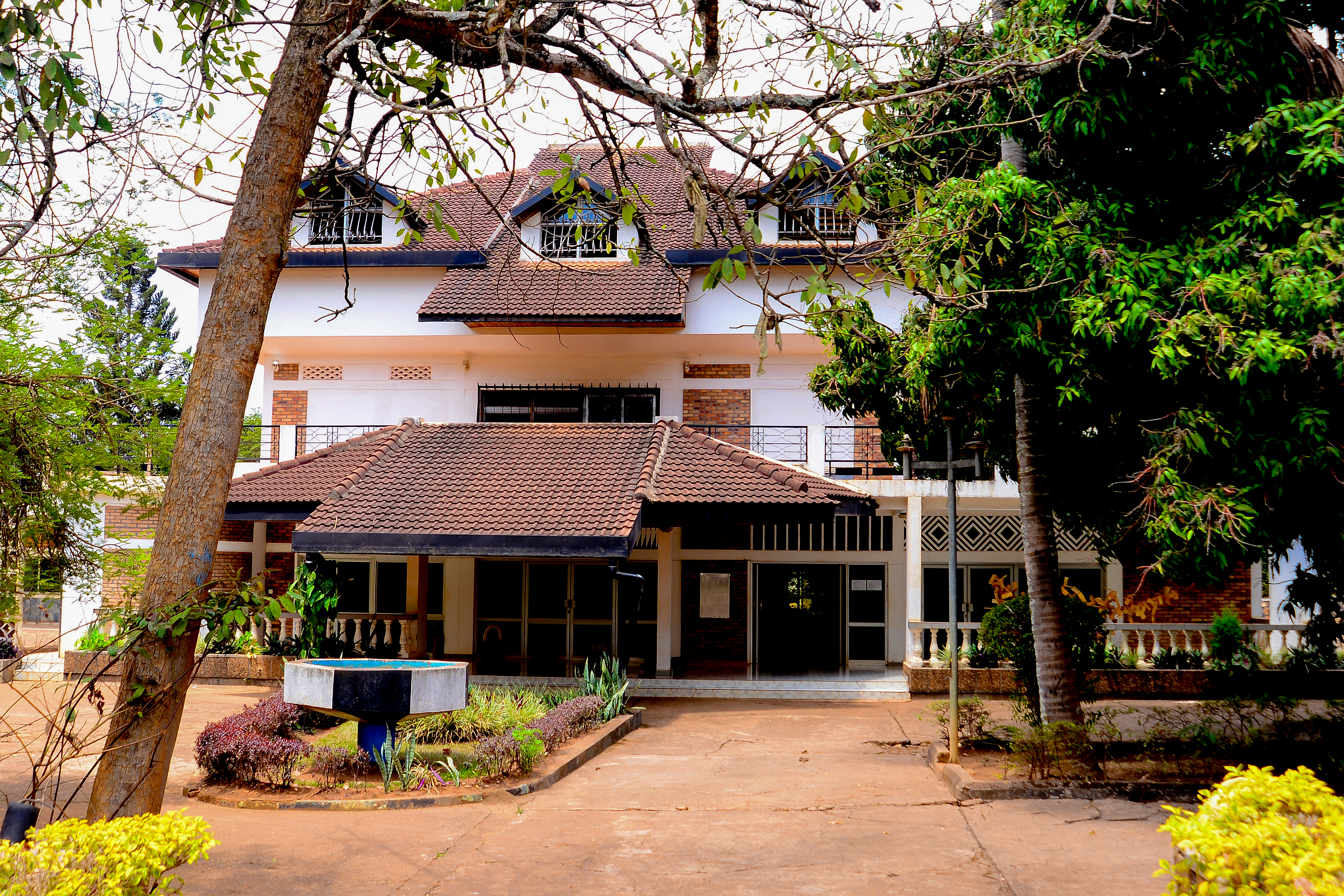
- Rwanda Art Museum from the outside
- Former name: Presidential Palace Museum
- Established: 2009
- Location: Kicukiro, Kigali
- Coordinates: 1.9753°S 30.173°E
- Type: Art museum
- Owner: Rwanda Cultural Heritage Academy

The Rwanda Art Museum (formerly the Presidential Palace Museum) is an art museum in Kigali that was founded in 2009. Until 1994, the building was the residence of Juvénal Habyarimana, the former president of Rwanda. The museum is located four kilometers east of Kigali Airport within the Nyarugunga sector of the Kicukiro district.

== Museum ==
The present museum building was built in the 1970s. Until the 1990s, it served as a villa for the then president, Juvénal Habyarimana. He lost his life when his plane was shot down on April 6, 1994. The assassination triggered the genocide against the Tutsi, in which between 800,000 and one million people were killed within three months. The remains of the aircraft can be seen in the museum garden.

In February 2009, the villa was opened to the public as the Presidential Palace Museum and on May 18, 2018, the museum was officially renamed the Rwanda Art Museum. Since then, contemporary artworks by Rwandan and international artists have been exhibited. The museum contains the largest collection of post-genocide artworks in Rwanda. In addition to the permanent exhibition, temporary and traveling exhibitions also take place.

== Operator ==
The Rwandan national museums were initially run by the Institute of National Museums of Rwanda (INMR), which was founded for this purpose in 1989. In August 2020, the INMR was merged with the Rwanda Academy of Language and Culture and the Rwanda Archives and Library Services to form the Rwanda Cultural Heritage Academy.

== See also ==
- List of museums in Rwanda
