= Institute of National Museums of Rwanda =

Governmental organization in Rwanda

The Institute of National Museums of Rwanda (INMR) was a governmental organization in Rwanda. It was merged into the Rwanda Cultural Heritage Academy in 2020.

It was started as an ethnographic museum in September 1989, consisting only of the National Museum of Rwanda in Butare, but it now contains the:

- Ethnographic Museum
- Kandt House Museum of Natural History
- Museum of Rwesero
- King's Palace Museum
- Rwanda Art Museum
- Museum of Environment
- National Liberation Museum Park
- Museum for Campaign Against Genocide

== See also ==
- List of museums in Rwanda
