= Butare Airport =

- IATA: BTQ; ICAO: HRYI

Summary
- Airport type: Public
- Owner: Rwanda Civil Aviation Authority
- Serves: Butare, Rwanda
- Location: Butare, Rwanda
- Elevation AMSL: 5,801 ft / 1,768 m
- Coordinates: 02°35′42″S 29°44′24″E

Map
- Location of Butare Airport in Rwanda; Placement on map is approximate

Runways
Direction	Length		Surface
Direction	ft	m	Surface
08/26	2,820	860	Asphalt

Butare Airport is an airport in Butare, Rwanda. It is also known as Huye Airstrip.

== Location ==
Butare Airport (IATA: BTQ, ICAO: HRYI), is located in the city of Huye (formerly called Butare), in Huye District, Southern Province. Its location lies approximately 80 kilometres (50 mi), by air, south-west of Kigali International Airport, the country's largest civilian airport. The geographic coordinates of this airport are:2° 35' 42.00"S, 29° 44' 24.00"E (Latitude:-2.59500; Longitude:29.74000).

== Overview ==
Butare Airport is a small civilian airport that serves the town of Huye. It is one of the eight (8) airports that are administered by the Rwanda Civil Aviation Authority. Butare Airport is situated 1,768 metres (5,801 ft) above sea level. The airport has a single paved runway, which measures approximately 860 metres (2,820 ft) in length. There is no terminal or any other building.

== See also ==
- Butare
- Civil Aviation Authority of Rwanda
- Huye District
- Southern Province, Rwanda
