= Marie Béatrice Umutesi =

Rwandan writer (born 1959)

Marie Béareice Umutesi
- Born: May 19, 1959 (age 66); Byumba, Rwanda
- Occupations: Writer, peace-activist, NGO worker
- Known for: Hutu refugee from Rwanda and memoir on it

Marie Béatrice Umutesi is a Rwandan writer, NGO worker, peace activist and refugee living in Belgium.

Born in Byumba, Rwanda in 1959 to a moderate Hutu family she studied sociology in university before going on to work in rural development. As a Hutu woman she was forced to flee to escape the Tutsi genocide of the Hutus, and she took refuge in the present day DRC surviving numerous attacks from the Rwandan Patriotic Front in 1996. By 1998, she had been forced to flee again and settled in Belgium working to restore peace and in conflict resolution between the Hutu's and Tutsis.

Her memoir of her experience as a refugee, originally written in French called, Fuir ou mourir au Zaire. Le vécu d'une réfugiée Rwandaise(English title: Surviving the Slaughter: The Ordeal of a Rwandan Refugee in Zaire), has been translated into half a dozen languages. Umutesi was fiercely critical of the international ignorance to the plight of the Hutu's and the refugees in Africa. Her perspective as a Hutu woman, the political faction responsible for the genocide of the Tutsis in 1994 as well as the victim of the Tutsi massacre of the Hutus afterwards makes her a controversial figure in her perspective on the conflict.

In the years since then, her academic and NGO work has been dedicated to peace building between the Tutsis and Hutus and in 2006, she wrote the article Is Reconciliation between Hutus and Tutsis Possible? for the Journal of International Affairs.

== Background and education ==
Marie Béatrice Umutesi was born in Byumba, Rwanda, on May 19, 1959, where she lived with her Hutu family. She attended primary school from 1964 to 1971 and secondary school from then until 1974, where she studied at Groupe Scolaire de Byumba. Frequent flare-ups in the post-colonial conflict between the Tutsi and Hutu ethnic groups marked her childhood. Umutesi came from a Hutu family. It was in 1963 that she first encountered the social conflict as her town came under the threat of guerilla attacks by Tutsi rebels. After power shifted to the Hutus, skirmishes remained, with their house being set on fire by other Hutus after being mistaken for the home of a Tutsi official. The conflict followed Umutesi to school during the 1973 student uprising, where Tutsi students, including friends of Umutesi, were expelled from the school. From then until 1990, there was relative peace, but it was still mired by simmering tensions. From 1974 to 1978, she studied economics at the Lycée Notre Dame de Cîteaux in Kigali; afterward, she studied at the Université Nationale du Rwanda in Butare in 1978. In 1982, she accepted a scholarship to go to Belgium for the first time to study sociology at the Université Catholique de Louvain. She returned to Rwanda in 1985 and worked as a civil servant with rural people, particularly women.

A new Tutsi rebellion broke out in 1990, organized under the name of the Rwandan Patriotic Front; rebel Tutsi invaded from Uganda. Umutesi, as a moderate Hutu and NGO head, feared imprisonment by the establishment Hutu, and the Hutu security services searched through her home and offices on suspicion of collaboration. Umutesi avoided prison. As displaced people moved inwards, talks of torture, massacres, and other barbarities from the RPF followed. In 1993, Umutesi began a project supporting women in Byumba; at the same time, the Tutsi rebels reached her family town. Some of Umutesi's cousins were killed in the slaughter that followed. Thousands were killed, and even more were displaced as the rebels took over; 25 of Umutesi's family members came to live with her as Kigali was spared from being overrun by rebels. Umutesi made multiple visits to the refugee camps to encourage the women to stockpile resources and to help with loans. The signing of the Arusha Accords seemed to signal the return to peace and the end of the Genocide of the Hutus until the assassination of President Habyarimana reignited the conflict. In April 1994, Umutesi was forced to flee as the conflict overtook her town, first to Gahanga, then Kabeza. Umutesi was able to evacuate some of her family but was again attacked by the RPF at Gitarama; then, they fled to Cyangugu and from Gikongoro, where she narrowly escaped death. Along the way, they heard and saw atrocious displays of violence and brutality towards the Hutus. By July 1994, she and her family had made their way to ADI-Kivu, a refugee camp in Zaire(present-day DRC). Her siblings joined her and began working to establish NGOs, other organizations, and support groups for refugees, particularly women, under the umbrella of the Collective of Rwandan NGOs. In August 1994, she was chosen to lead the self-organization program for women in the camp. Afterward, she moved to the INERA camp closer to her work. Many of her colleagues fled to safer countries, but Umutesi remained until both the INERA camp and Bukuvu fell. After escaping again, Umutesi was held prisoner for two weeks by the Tiri Militia until ex-FAR soldiers rescued them. In December 1996, they were held by the Zairean army at Tingi-Tingi. When the camp at Tingi-Tingi was destroyed, Umutesi fled again, crossing the Lubutu River and encountering shooting before arriving in the village of Obilo. Umutesi made her way through the forest with groups of other refugees, taken in along the way and hidden from rebels, moving again and again to stay alive. Finally, four years after encountering the rebels and with the help of some NGO colleagues, Umutesi made it to Belgium on April 2, 1998.

== Later work ==
Marie Béatrice Umutesi works as a writer, NGO worker and peace activist in Belgium where she continues to advocate for peace building and conflict transformation particularly through the repair of relations between the Hutu and Tutsi ethnic groups.

Her memoir on her experience as a survivor Fuir ou mourir au Zaire. Le vécu d'une réfugiée Rwandaise(English title: Surviving the Slaughter: The Ordeal of a Rwandan Refugee in Zaire) is viewed as one of the most significant works on refugees of the Rwandan genocide, particularly Hutu victims of the genocide. Umutesi maintains the apolitical nature of her written work, choosing to focus on the humanitarian effect on individuals, particularly women, caught up in the storm of the ethnic conflict. She wrote to remember and to keep the story alive, so that nobody can say they didn't know it had happened.

Umutesi is adamant that the killing of the Hutu's in the wake of the 1994 genocide of the Tutsis rises to the level of genocide, however her narrative is about the common victimhood and survivorship of everyone in Rwanda during those tumultuous years. Umutesi was critical of the ignorance of western journalists in their coverage of Hutu refugee camps and the international communities inability and lack of desire to provide peace-keeping or aid for the refugees as well as the misguided attempts by agencies such as the UNHCR who desired to repatriate the refugees, without regard to the danger they faced in returning.

Umutesi's politics, advocating for the arrest of everyone involved with the killings, both Hutu and Tutsi, and understanding of a common victim hood and perpetrator-ship have put her at odds with the public and political leadership in Rwanda and she has said that she would almost certainly be arrested or worse if she were to return to Rwanda.

== Awards ==
In 2012 she received the Daniele Po International Award.
