= Ruhengeri Airport =

- IATA: RHG; ICAO: HRYU

Summary
- Airport type: Public, Civilian
- Owner: Rwanda Civil Aviation Authority
- Serves: Ruhengeri, Rwanda
- Location: Ruhengeri, Rwanda
- Elevation AMSL: 6,100 ft / 1,860 m
- Coordinates: 01°30′00″S 29°38′01″E

Map
- Location of Ruhengeri Airport in Rwanda; Placement on map is approximate

Runways
Direction	Length		Surface
Direction	ft	m	Surface
15/33	4,860	1,480	Asphalt

Ruhengeri Airport is an airport in Ruhengeri, Rwanda.

== Location ==
Ruhengeri Airport (IATA: RHG, ICAO: HRYU) is located in Rwanda's Northern Province, in Musanze District, in the town of Ruhengeri. This location lies approximately 227 kilometres (141 mi), by air, northwest of Kigali International Airport, currently, the country's largest civilian airport. The geographic coordinates of this airport are:1° 30' 0.00"S, 29° 38' 1.00"E (Latitude:-1.50000; Longitude:29.63361).

== Overview ==
Ruhengeri Airport is a medium-sized airport that serves the town of Ruhengeri and neighbouring communities. It is one of the eight public civilian airports under the administration of the Rwanda Civil Aviation Authority. Ruhengeri Airport is situated at an altitude of about 1,860 metres (6,100 ft) above sea level. The airport has a single asphalt runway that measures 1,480 metres (4,860 ft) in length.
