= Nemba Airport =

- IATA: n/a; ICAO: HRYN

Summary
- Airport type: Public, Civilian
- Owner: Rwanda Civil Aviation Authority
- Serves: Nemba, Rwanda
- Location: Nemba, Rwanda
- Elevation AMSL: 4,905 ft / 1,495 m
- Coordinates: 02°19′48″S 30°12′00″E

Map
- Location of Nemba Airport in Rwanda; Placement on map is approximate

Runways
Direction	Length		Surface
Direction	ft	m	Surface
13/31	3,600	1,100	Unpaved

Nemba Airport is an airport in Rwanda.

== Location ==
Nemba Airport (IATA: n/a, ICAO: HRYN) is located in Rwanda's Eastern Province, in Bugesera District, in the town of Nemba, at the International border with Republic of Burundi. This location lies approximately 50 kilometres (31 mi), by air, southeast of Kigali International Airport, currently, the country's largest civilian airport.

The geographic coordinates of this airport are 2° 19' 48.00"S, 30° 12' 0.00"E (Latitude:-2.33000; Longitude:30.20000). Nemba Airport is situated at an elevation of about 1,495 metres (4,905 ft) above sea level. The airport has a single unpaved runway that measures approximately 1,100 metres (3,600 ft) in length.

== Overview ==
Nemba Airport is a small rural airport that serves the town of Nemba and neighbouring communities. It is one of the eight public civilian airports under the administration of the Rwanda Civil Aviation Authority.

== See also ==
- Nemba
- Bugesera District
- Eastern Province, Rwanda
- Rwanda Civil Aviation Authority
