= Nemba =

Settlement in Eastern Province, Rwanda

- Settlement
- Location within Rwanda
- Coordinates: 02°21′09″S 30°13′03″E
- Country: Rwanda
- Province: Eastern Province
- District: Bugesera District
- Elevation: 5,102 ft (1,555 m)

Nemba (Kinyarwanda pronunciation) is a settlement in southeastern Rwanda, in the Bugesera District of the Eastern Province. Located near Rwanda's border with Burundi, it serves as an important transit point for trade between the two countries. To this end, a "one-stop border post" was established in Nemba and the adjacent territory in Burundi to fast-track travel and trade between the two countries. Nemba Airport is a civilian airport that serves the settlement and wider area.

== Geography ==
Nemba is located in Bugesera District, in the Eastern Province of Rwanda, at the border with Burundi. Its location is about 60 kilometres (37 mi), by road, southeast of Kigali, Rwanda's capital and largest city. Nemba is located at an average elevation of 1,555 metres (5,102 ft) above sea level.

== Demographics ==
In 2012, the national population census enumerated the population of Rweru Sector, of which Nemba Cell is a constituent part, at 28,782 people.

== Transportation and trade ==
The international border crossing is administered through a "one-stop border post", whereby the customs, immigration, and police clearances of both countries are processed in one shared building when leaving one country and entering the other. The facilities, funded by the African Development Bank, provide quick services for travellers, particularly traders, with clearances reportedly taking only five minutes. In 2010, the bank invested US$45 million in transportation infrastructure in Bugesera District, building 20 kilometres (12 mi) of highway to connect Rwandan border posts with the Burundian city of Kirundo.

The settlement has a small civilian airport administered by the Rwanda Civil Aviation Authority named Nemba Airport.
