= List of cities in Rwanda =

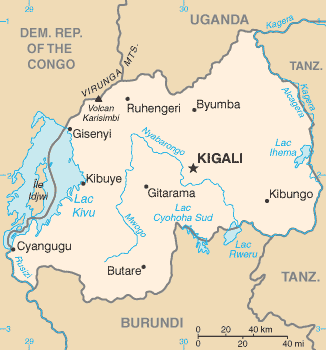
Map of Rwanda

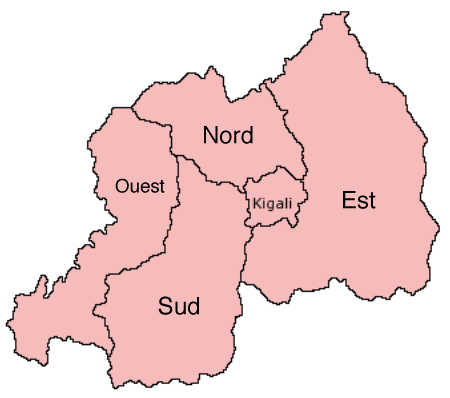
Provinces of Rwanda in 2006

This is a list of cities in Rwanda:

== Cities ==
=== City of Kigali ===
- Kicukiro
- Rutongo
- Kacyiru

=== Southern province ===
- Nyanza (provincial capital)
- Muhanga
- Kamonyi
- Ruhango
- Gisagara
- Nyaruguru
- Nyamagabe
- Huye

=== Northern province ===
- Byumba (provincial capital)
- Ruhengeri

=== Western province ===
- Kibuye (provincial capital)
- Cyangugu
- Gisenyi

=== Eastern province ===
- Rwamagana (provincial capital)
- Kibungo

== Cities in Rwanda by population ==
City	Population 1978 (census)	Population 1991 (census)	Population 2012 (census)	Province
Kigali	115,990	235,664	859,332	City of Kigali
Gisenyi	12,655	22,156	136,830	Western
Ruhengeri	18,942	29,286	59,333	Northern
Butare	n/a	29,300	50,220	Southern
Muhanga	8,531	17,490	49,038	Southern
Byumba	7,702	11,947	34,544	Northern
Cyangugu	7,201	9,693	27,416	Western
Nyanza	n/a	9,100	25,417	Southern
Bugarama	n/a	n/a	24,679	Western
Kayonza	n/a	n/a	21,482	Eastern
Rwamagana	n/a	6,500	18,009	Eastern
Nyamata	n/a	n/a	17,076	Eastern
Ruhango	n/a	n/a	17,051	Southern
Gikongoro	5,637	8,506	16,695	Southern
Nyagatare	n/a	n/a	14,320	Eastern
Busogo	n/a	n/a	12,460	Northern
Kibuye	3,045	4,393	12,325	Western
Kibungo	n/a	7,100	11,537	Eastern
Rubengera	n/a	n/a	10,431	Western

== See also ==
- Geography of Rwanda
- List of cities in East Africa
- Urban planning in Africa: Rwanda
