= Rutongo =

- Map of Rwanda showing the location of Rutongo
- Coordinates: 01°49′03″S 30°03′33″E
- Country: Rwanda
- Province: City of Kigali
- District: Gasabo
- Elevation: 1,579 m (5,180 ft)

Population
  - Urban: 50.000
- Time zone: UTC+2 (CAT)

Rutongo is a city on the outskirts of the Kigali urban area in Rwanda. It is about 10 kilometres (6.2 mi) from the capital.

== History ==
The Rutongo Mines company mined a deposit of cassiterite. In 1948, in his story The New Congo, the journalist Tom Marvel wrote about this "...beautiful mine, as Richesses of Rwanda".

The city houses the Rutongo Major Propaedeutic Seminary.

== Bibliography ==
- (in French) Approche socio-économique : secteur artisanal, Commune de Rutongo, Association de coopération et de recherche pour le développement (Rwanda), 1987, 194 p.
