= Nyanza =

Nyanza may refer to:

- Nyanza, Rwanda
  - Nyanza District, the district surrounding Nyanza, Rwanda
- Nyanza Province, Kenya
- Nyanza Lac, Burundi
- Nyanza, the Bantu word for lake, in particular:
  - Lake Albert (Africa) (Albert Nyanza)
  - Lake Edward (Edward Nyanza)
  - Lake Victoria (Victoria Nyanza)
- Nyanza, Nova Scotia, a community in Canada
- SS Nyanza (1907), an Edwardian cargo steamship still trading on Lake Victoria in East Africa
- Nyanza (Company), a dye manufacturing company in Ashland, MA that went bankrupt in 1978
- Shades of chartreuse § Nyanza, a hue

== See also ==
- Mwanza (disambiguation)
- The dictionary definition of nyanza at Wiktionary
