= Byumba =

- City and sector
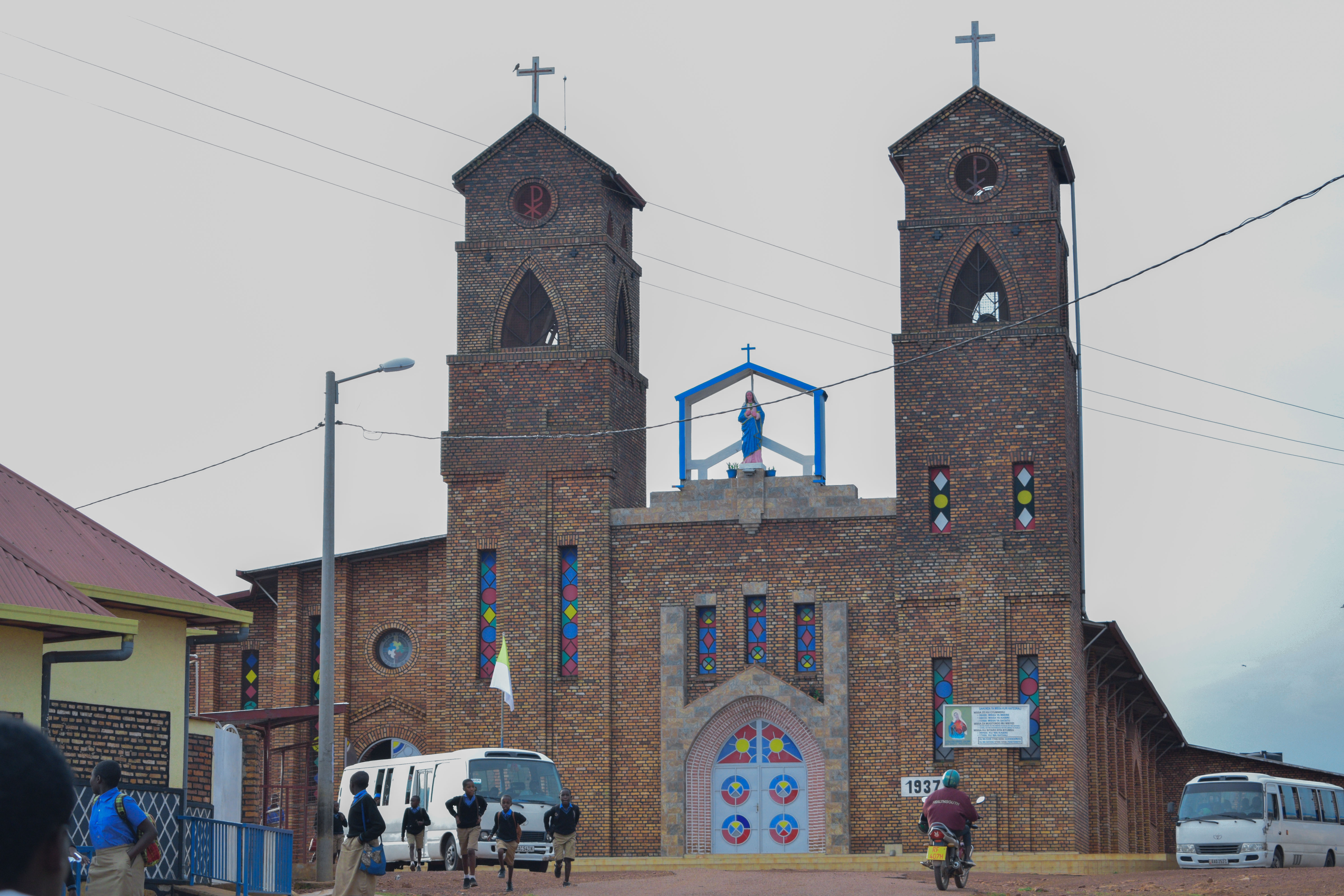
- The Roman Catholic Diocese of Byumba

- Location in Rwanda
- Coordinates: 1°34′34″S 30°04′03″E
- Country: Rwanda
- Admin. Province: Northern Province
- District: Gicumbi

Area
  - City and sector: 48.25 km^{2} (18.63 sq mi)
- Elevation: 2,237 m (7,339 ft)

Population (2022 census)
  - City and sector: 43,134
  - Density: 894.0/km^{2} (2,315/sq mi)
  - Urban: 19,270
- Climate: Cwb

UMURENGE WA BYUMBA

Byumba is a city and sector in northern Rwanda and the capital of Gicumbi District. It is home to an SOS Children's Village. The city lies about 60 kilometres (37 mi), north of the capital Kigali. This location lies approximately 30 kilometres (19 mi), south of the International border with Uganda at Gatuna.

== Population ==
As of 2012, the human population in Byumba was estimated at 75,463.

== Economic activity ==
Banque Populaire du Rwanda (BPR), maintains a branch in Byumba.

== Education ==
- University of Technology and Arts at Byumba (UTAB)

== Climate ==
Climate data for Byumba (1991–2020)
Month	Jan	Feb	Mar	Apr	May	Jun	Jul	Aug	Sep	Oct	Nov	Dec	Year
Record high °C (°F)	28.4 (83.1)	27.4 (81.3)	27.7 (81.9)	25.0 (77.0)	25.3 (77.5)	24.9 (76.8)	25.0 (77.0)	26.0 (78.8)	26.1 (79.0)	27.2 (81.0)	24.8 (76.6)	25.9 (78.6)	28.4 (83.1)
Mean daily maximum °C (°F)	21.8 (71.2)	22.1 (71.8)	21.7 (71.1)	20.9 (69.6)	20.6 (69.1)	20.9 (69.6)	21.6 (70.9)	22.3 (72.1)	22.4 (72.3)	21.6 (70.9)	20.8 (69.4)	21.2 (70.2)	21.5 (70.7)
Daily mean °C (°F)	17.1 (62.8)	17.2 (63.0)	17.0 (62.6)	16.5 (61.7)	16.2 (61.2)	16.3 (61.3)	16.7 (62.1)	17.2 (63.0)	17.3 (63.1)	16.8 (62.2)	16.3 (61.3)	16.6 (61.9)	16.8 (62.2)
Mean daily minimum °C (°F)	12.4 (54.3)	12.3 (54.1)	12.3 (54.1)	12.0 (53.6)	11.9 (53.4)	11.7 (53.1)	11.9 (53.4)	12.2 (54.0)	12.2 (54.0)	12.0 (53.6)	11.9 (53.4)	12.1 (53.8)	12.1 (53.8)
Record low °C (°F)	10.0 (50.0)	9.2 (48.6)	9.0 (48.2)	9.3 (48.7)	8.2 (46.8)	7.5 (45.5)	7.5 (45.5)	8.1 (46.6)	8.8 (47.8)	9.1 (48.4)	9.2 (48.6)	9.5 (49.1)	7.5 (45.5)
Average precipitation mm (inches)	63.6 (2.50)	85.5 (3.37)	156.7 (6.17)	175.1 (6.89)	122.2 (4.81)	29.7 (1.17)	10.8 (0.43)	54.4 (2.14)	112.4 (4.43)	132.8 (5.23)	132.3 (5.21)	72.3 (2.85)	1,147.8 (45.19)
Average precipitation days (≥ 1.0 mm)	6.6	8.4	15.1	17.3	12.8	3.3	1.2	5.0	12.4	15.8	17.0	10.6	125.4
Source: NOAA

== Notable people ==
- Marie Béatrice Umutesi, writer
- Donald Kaberuka, economist
