= Rwesero Art Museum =

- Location: Nyanza, Rwanda
- Type: Art museum

Rwesero Art Museum is a museum in Nyanza, Rwanda. It is under the responsibility of the Institute of National Museums of Rwanda.

It was built as a palace for King Mutara III Rudahigwa, but he never had time to move into it; he died before occupying it, and was turned into an art museum.
