= Rosalie Gicanda =

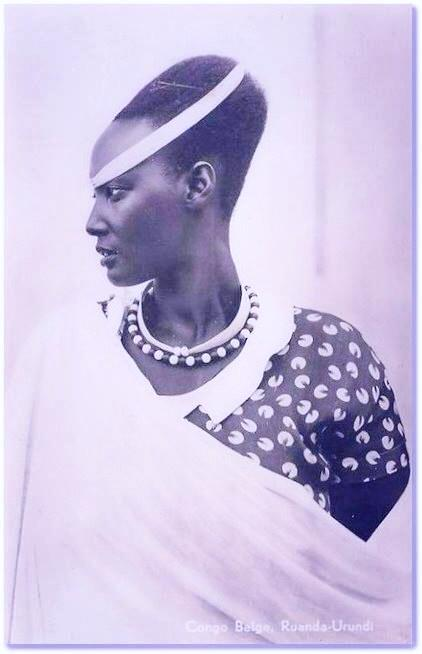

Queen consort of Rwanda
- Tenure: 13 January 1942 – 25 July 1959
- Born: 1928; Rwamagana, Rwanda-Urundi
- Died: 20 April 1994 (aged 65–66); Butare, Rwanda
- Burial: Nyanza District
- Spouse: Mutara III Rudahigwa
- Clan: Abanyiginya
- Religion: Catholicism

Rosalie Gicanda (1928 – 20 April 1994) was the wife of Rwandan King (Kinyarwanda: mwami) Mutara III Rudahigwa. After her husband died in mysterious circumstances in 1959, the Rwandan monarchy lasted only two more years under King Kigeli V Ndahindurwa, coming to an end with the Rwandan Revolution in 1961. The then-Queen Dowager continued to live in Butare in Butare Province, Rwanda, along with Prince Damascene Paradis, her mother and several ladies-in-waiting, where she was later murdered during the 1994 Genocide against the Tutsi.

== Life ==
Born in 1928 in Rwamagana, Rosalie Gicanda is the daughter of Martin Gatsinzi, of the Banyiginya-Bahebera clan, and Christiane Makwindigiri, of the Bega clan. She is the sister of Asteria Bisinda, mother of Paul Kagame, the current president of Rwanda.

In 1953 the American writer John Gunther visited Rwanda in preparation for his book Inside Africa. After interviewing her husband Mutara III, Gunther met socially with Queen Rosalie Gicanda. He described her as being shy in manner, speaking French well but not having travelled widely.

In 1961, during the Rwandan revolution that brought an end to the Tutsi monarchy and the Kingdom of Rwanda, she saved the life of her four-year-old nephew, Paul Kagame, and his family by helping them escape when Hutus from the neighborhood, encouraged by local and colonial authorities, seized the hill where they lived, massacring the Tutsis.

== Death ==
On 20 April 1994, as the 1994 Genocide against Tutsi began in earnest in Butare, a detachment of soldiers commanded by Lt. Pierre Bizimana, acting under the orders of Capt. Ildéphonse Nizeyimana, kidnapped the former Queen along with others from her house. They then took the captives behind the National Museum (now the Ethnographic Museum) and shot them. Only a younger girl survived to tell the story of the murders. Two days later, the Queen's mother was also murdered. At the request of a priest, Butare mayor Kanyabashi recovered Queen Gicanda’s body and had it buried in the yard next to her house. She was later reburied at the Mwima Mausoleum where her husband King Mutara III Rudahigwa and King Kigeli V Ndahindurwa are also buried.

== Public reaction ==
The Queen was a living symbol for Tutsis, and her murder shocked many. It effectively signaled the beginning of the mass killing in the Butare area, which saw some of the worst atrocities committed during the fighting.

After the genocide, a Rwandan military court found Bizimana and Private 1st Class Aloys Mazimpaka guilty of genocide and the murder of Queen Gicanda and her family. (Chambre Specialisée du Conseil de Guerre de Butare, case no. LMD 187, LP 0001-PS 97, Judgment pronounced July 27, 1998.) Bizimana was sentenced to death, Mazimpaka to life in prison.

On 6 October 2009, Nizeyimana was arrested in Kampala, Uganda. Nizeyimana was one of the most wanted suspects in the Rwandan genocide. On 19 June 2012, he was convicted by the International Criminal Tribunal for Rwanda of ordering the killing of the former Tutsi queen, as well as other murders, and was sentenced to life imprisonment.
