= Rwandan National Institute of Scientific Research =

The Rwandan National Institute of Scientific Research is a scientific institution based in Butare, Rwanda. It plays an important role in science and technology in Rwanda.

The institute has worked with the National University of Rwanda in the Phytomedicine and Life Sciences Research Plan which began research into pharmacopeia and traditional medicine in the country at the National University of Rwanda in 1972 in the Faculty of Medicine. The Rwandan National Institute of Scientific Research later became involved and also collaborates with researchers from the National Institute of Scientific Research (INRS) and researchers from the Institute of Agronomic Sciences of Rwanda (ISAR).
