= Nyamyumba Hot Springs =

Hot springs on the shore of Lake Kivu, Rwanda

- Amashyuza
- Location within Rwanda
- Interactive map of Nyamyumba Hot Springs
- Location: Nyamyumba Sector, Rubavu District, Western Province, Rwanda
- Coordinates: 1.74004°S 29.273409°E
- Type: Hot spring

The Nyamyumba Hot Springs, known locally by the Kinyarwanda name Amashyuza, are natural hot springs located on the eastern shore of Lake Kivu in Nyamyumba Sector, Rubavu District, Western Province, Rwanda. Situated approximately 7 kilometres from the town of Gisenyi (also known as Rubavu), the springs consist of two pools locally named "male" and "female." They lie within the western branch of the East African Rift System, near the Virunga volcanic complex, which accounts for their geothermal heating mechanism. Tourism and therapeutic bathing activities have developed around the springs, which are visited by both local residents and international tourists.

== Description ==
Located 7 km from the town of Gisenyi, in western Rwanda on the shores of Lake Kivu, the Nyamyumba Hot Springs consist of small natural pools of hot, and sometimes boiling, water. The waters are reputed to have healing properties. The thermal springs are known locally as Amashyuza and are situated on the eastern shore of Lake Kivu. The springs are divided into two pools, locally named "male" and "female," a naming convention that originates with local people based on the areas traditionally reserved for men and women respectively.

== Geology ==
The Nyamyumba Hot Springs are located in the western branch of the East African Rift System, near the Virunga volcanic complex, which explains the rising and heating mechanism of the spring water. Geochemical analysis by Hategekimana et al. (2022) found that the spring water is of the Na-HCO₃ type, with higher concentrations of dissolved minerals than the adjacent Lake Kivu water, consistent with the dissolution of host rocks by hot water circulating through the rift system. The measured parameters have been compared against World Health Organization (WHO) standards for recreational waters. The study also noted the potential of the springs as a source of geothermal energy, and discussed possible mixing of the original hot waters with cooler near-surface waters.

== Tourism ==
An economic and tourist activity has developed around these hot springs on the shores of Lake Kivu. The open-air thermal baths provide opportunities for socialising with the inhabitants of Gisenyi, the nearby town to the north, which borders Goma in the Democratic Republic of the Congo. Next to the large fish market to the south of Gisenyi, economic operators and masseurs offer their services to locals and particularly to tourists visiting Lake Kivu. The latter arrive during stopovers on boats travelling across Lake Kivu.

== See also ==
- Lake Kivu
- Gisenyi
