= Union of Baptist Churches in Rwanda =

- Union des églises baptistes au Rwanda
- Classification: Evangelical Christianity
- Theology: Baptist
- Associations: Baptist World Alliance
- Headquarters: Kigali, Rwanda
- Origin: 1962
- Congregations: 65
- Members: 30,040
- Official website: ubcr.org

The Union of Baptist Churches in Rwanda (French: Union des églises baptistes au Rwanda is a Baptist Christian denomination in Rwanda. It is affiliated with the Baptist World Alliance. The headquarters is in Kigali.

== History ==
The Union has its origins in a Baptist mission of Baptist Union of Denmark in 1939. The union is founded in 1962. According to a census published by the association in 2023, it claimed 65 churches and 30,040 members.

== See also ==
- Religion in Rwanda
