= Julienne Uwacu =

Rwandan politician

- Born: 1979 (age 46–47); Rwanda
- Citizenship: Rwandan
- Occupation: Politician
- Years active: 2008–present
- Known for: Politics
- Title: Cabinet Minister of Sports & Culture, Cabinet of Rwanda

Julienne Uwacu is a politician in Rwanda, who has served as the cabinet minister of sports and culture in the Cabinet of Rwanda, since 24 February 2015. In the cabinet reshuffle of 31 August 2017, Julienne Uwacu retained her portfolio.

== Background ==
She was born in Rwanda, circa 1979.

== Career ==
Her political career started prior to 2008, when she served as the Vice Mayor of Nyabihu District, responsible for the economy and development. In 2008, she was elected to parliament, serving in that capacity until February 2015. While in parliament, she served as "the deputy chairperson of the parliamentary Committee on Foreign Affairs, Cooperation and Security".

In 2015, she took over the reins at the Rwandan ministry of sports and culture (Minispoc); the first woman to serve in that capacity, replacing Joseph Habineza, who was dropped from cabinet.

== Personal ==
Julienne Uwacu is married and is the mother of four children.

== See also ==
- Parliament of Rwanda
