= Busogo =

- Town and sector
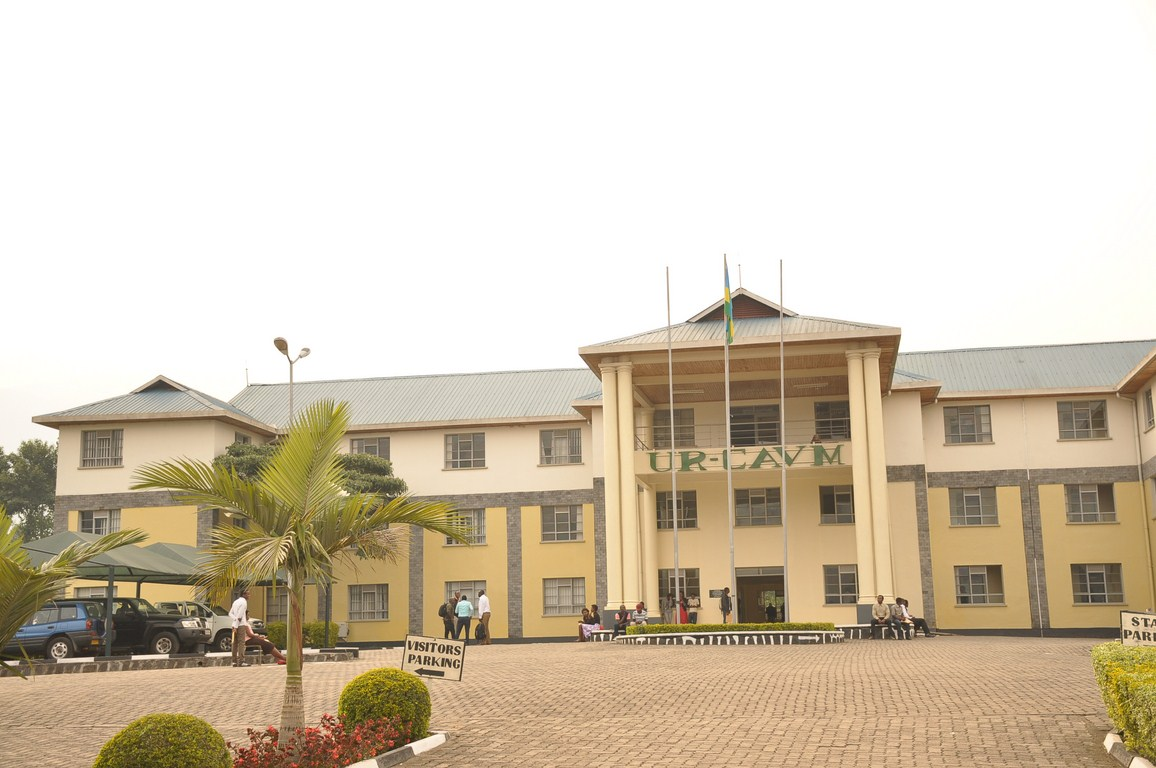
- Busogo Campus

- Location in Rwanda
- Coordinates: 1°33′26″S 29°32′39″E
- Country: Rwanda
- Province: Northern Province
- District: Musanze

Area
  - Town and sector: 20.13 km^{2} (7.77 sq mi)

Population (2022 census)
  - Town and sector: 28,264
  - Density: 1,404/km^{2} (3,637/sq mi)
  - Urban: 21,143
- Time zone: UTC+2 (CAT)

Busogo is a town and sector of Musanze district, Northern Province, Rwanda.

== Climate ==
Climate data for Busogo (1991–2020)
Month	Jan	Feb	Mar	Apr	May	Jun	Jul	Aug	Sep	Oct	Nov	Dec	Year
Record high °C (°F)	28.3 (82.9)	28.0 (82.4)	27.1 (80.8)	26.6 (79.9)	25.3 (77.5)	24.7 (76.5)	25.0 (77.0)	26.8 (80.2)	27.3 (81.1)	27.1 (80.8)	26.6 (79.9)	27.8 (82.0)	28.3 (82.9)
Mean daily maximum °C (°F)	22.1 (71.8)	22.2 (72.0)	21.7 (71.1)	21.1 (70.0)	20.1 (68.2)	20.4 (68.7)	19.9 (67.8)	20.7 (69.3)	21.1 (70.0)	20.8 (69.4)	21.4 (70.5)	21.7 (71.1)	21.1 (70.0)
Daily mean °C (°F)	15.8 (60.4)	16.0 (60.8)	15.7 (60.3)	15.9 (60.6)	15.6 (60.1)	15.2 (59.4)	14.4 (57.9)	15.2 (59.4)	15.6 (60.1)	15.6 (60.1)	15.6 (60.1)	15.8 (60.4)	15.5 (59.9)
Mean daily minimum °C (°F)	9.5 (49.1)	9.9 (49.8)	9.7 (49.5)	10.7 (51.3)	11.1 (52.0)	10.0 (50.0)	8.9 (48.0)	9.6 (49.3)	10.1 (50.2)	10.3 (50.5)	9.7 (49.5)	10.0 (50.0)	10.0 (50.0)
Record low °C (°F)	5.0 (41.0)	4.8 (40.6)	5.0 (41.0)	6.8 (44.2)	6.7 (44.1)	5.3 (41.5)	3.5 (38.3)	5.0 (41.0)	5.5 (41.9)	6.0 (42.8)	3.9 (39.0)	5.3 (41.5)	3.5 (38.3)
Average precipitation mm (inches)	121.1 (4.77)	101.8 (4.01)	160.8 (6.33)	210.1 (8.27)	141.4 (5.57)	68.5 (2.70)	12.5 (0.49)	68.3 (2.69)	126.9 (5.00)	148.4 (5.84)	196.3 (7.73)	118.7 (4.67)	1,474.7 (58.06)
Average precipitation days (≥ 1.0 mm)	12.8	13.7	18.2	20.8	15.6	4.1	1.4	6.8	16.2	21.2	22.3	17.0	170.0
Source: NOAA
