= Ruhengeri =

Ruhengeri Musanze
- City
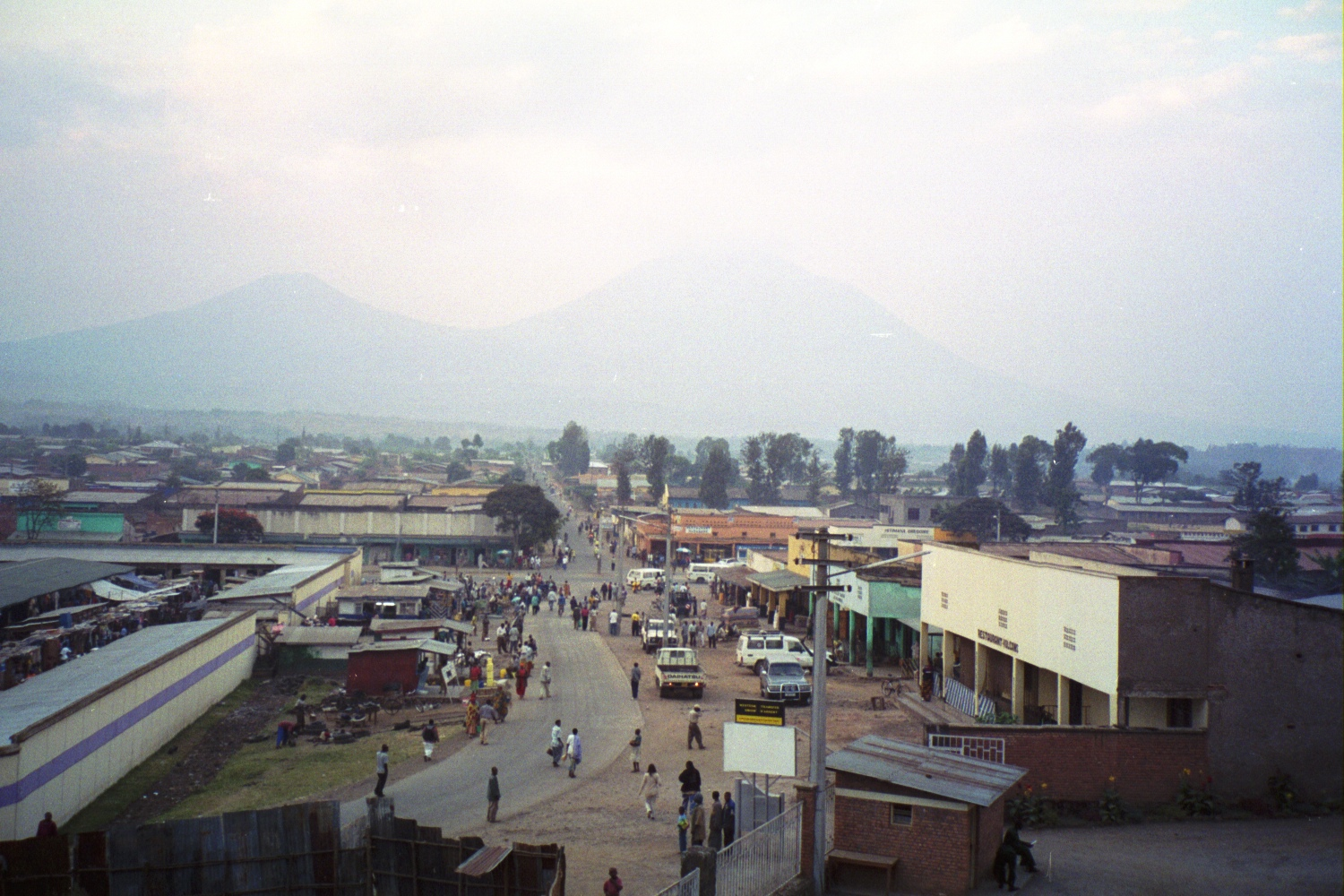

- Location in Rwanda
- Coordinates: 1°30′S 29°38′E
- Country: Rwanda
- Admin. Province: Northern Province
- District: Musanze

Area
  - Muhoza sector: 8.17 sq mi (21.15 km^{2})
- Elevation: 6,178 ft (1,883 m)

Population (2022 census)
  - Total: 153,368
- Climate: Cwb

Audio pronunciation of Ruhengeri Centre (Musanze City)

Ruhengeri, today known as Musanze is the third largest city in Rwanda and the capital of Musanze District in the Northern Province of Rwanda. The city has a population of 153,368 as of the 2022 census.

== Name ==
Some sources now refer to the city itself as Musanze, after the district in which it lies within. This has to do with the adopted policy of renaming Rwanda cities, which was done to eliminate memories of the past and to install new administrations in the country.

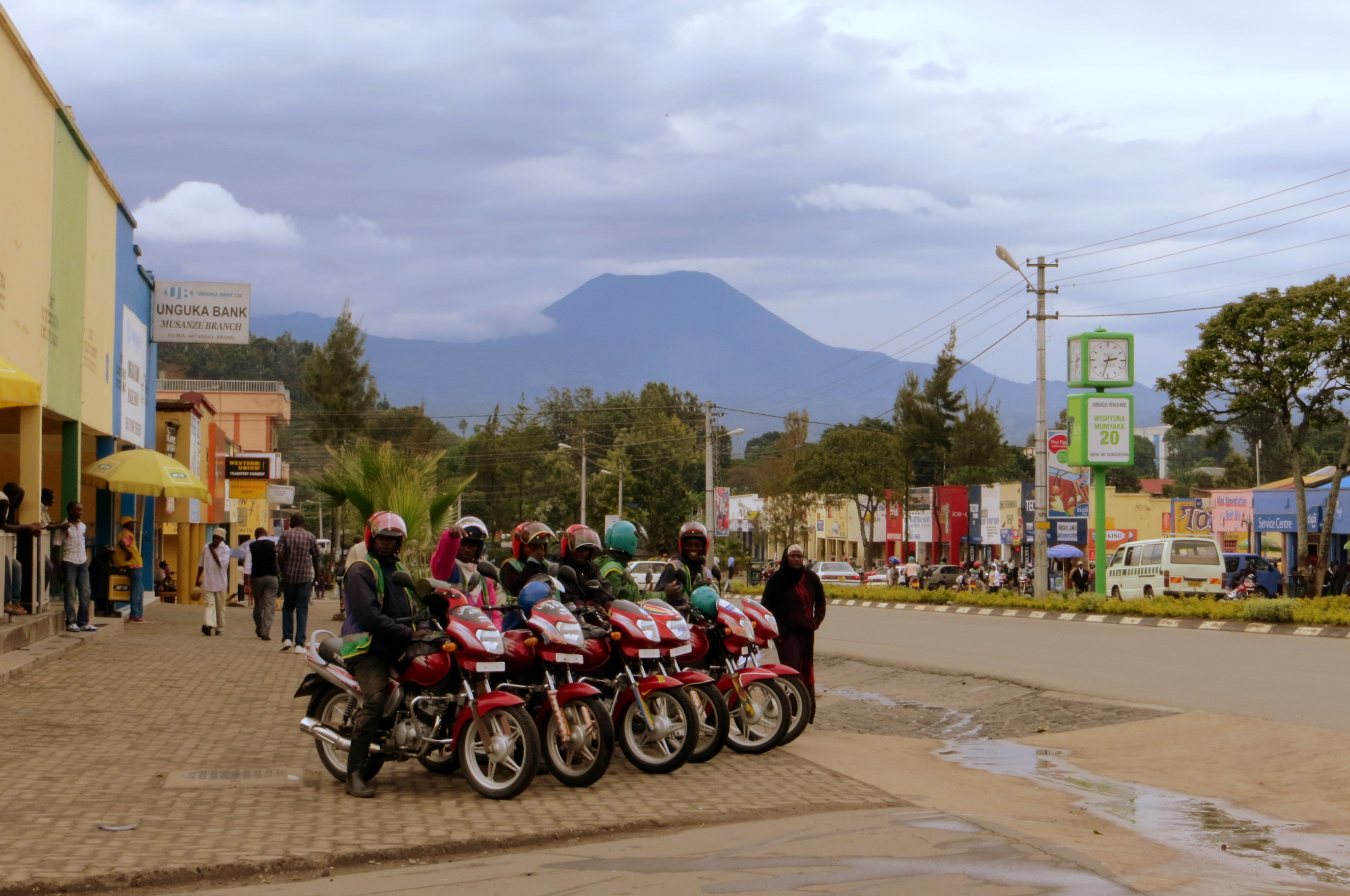
Photo of Ruhengeri in 2012 with volcanoes visible in the background

== Geography ==
Ruhengeri lies near the twin lakes of Lake Burera and Lake Ruhondo and is the gateway city to Volcanoes National Park and the famous mountain gorillas in the north-western part of the country.

The city's proximity to the Volcanoes National Park has made it a popular tourist destination with several restaurants and hotels mainly aimed at visitors to the national park.

=== Climate ===
Climate data for Ruhengeri Airport (1991–2020)
Month	Jan	Feb	Mar	Apr	May	Jun	Jul	Aug	Sep	Oct	Nov	Dec	Year
Record high °C (°F)	29.9 (85.8)	30.2 (86.4)	28.2 (82.8)	27.0 (80.6)	27.5 (81.5)	26.7 (80.1)	27.1 (80.8)	28.0 (82.4)	29.8 (85.6)	30.0 (86.0)	27.1 (80.8)	27.8 (82.0)	30.2 (86.4)
Mean daily maximum °C (°F)	24.5 (76.1)	24.6 (76.3)	24.1 (75.4)	23.5 (74.3)	23.0 (73.4)	23.3 (73.9)	23.9 (75.0)	24.4 (75.9)	24.8 (76.6)	24.0 (75.2)	23.2 (73.8)	23.7 (74.7)	23.9 (75.0)
Daily mean °C (°F)	18.1 (64.6)	18.3 (64.9)	18.1 (64.6)	18.1 (64.6)	17.9 (64.2)	17.6 (63.7)	17.7 (63.9)	18.3 (64.9)	18.5 (65.3)	18.1 (64.6)	17.5 (63.5)	17.4 (63.3)	18.0 (64.4)
Mean daily minimum °C (°F)	11.8 (53.2)	12.0 (53.6)	12.0 (53.6)	12.7 (54.9)	12.9 (55.2)	11.9 (53.4)	11.6 (52.9)	12.2 (54.0)	12.2 (54.0)	12.1 (53.8)	11.7 (53.1)	11.1 (52.0)	12.0 (53.6)
Record low °C (°F)	6.1 (43.0)	7.3 (45.1)	6.9 (44.4)	8.5 (47.3)	8.0 (46.4)	7.0 (44.6)	5.5 (41.9)	7.0 (44.6)	6.2 (43.2)	6.6 (43.9)	6.9 (44.4)	6.5 (43.7)	5.5 (41.9)
Average precipitation mm (inches)	95.6 (3.76)	99 (3.9)	145.9 (5.74)	202.4 (7.97)	140.9 (5.55)	56.8 (2.24)	13.3 (0.52)	49.4 (1.94)	123.8 (4.87)	179.7 (7.07)	170.2 (6.70)	102.2 (4.02)	1,379.3 (54.30)
Average precipitation days (≥ 1.0 mm)	11.2	11.9	18.4	20.8	16.3	4.9	1.5	4.9	16.0	22.3	21.2	14.2	163.6
Source: NOAA

== Notable institutions ==
Ruhengeri is also home to the Institute of Applied Sciences (INES-Ruhengeri). INES-Ruhengeri was established in 2003 in collaboration with the Catholic Diocese of Ruhengeri.

The city is served by the Ruhengeri Airport.

== Notable people ==
- Protais Zigiranyirazo, former governor of the Ruhengeri prefecture and accused war criminal
