= Ethnographic Museum (Rwanda) =

Museum in Butare, Rwanda

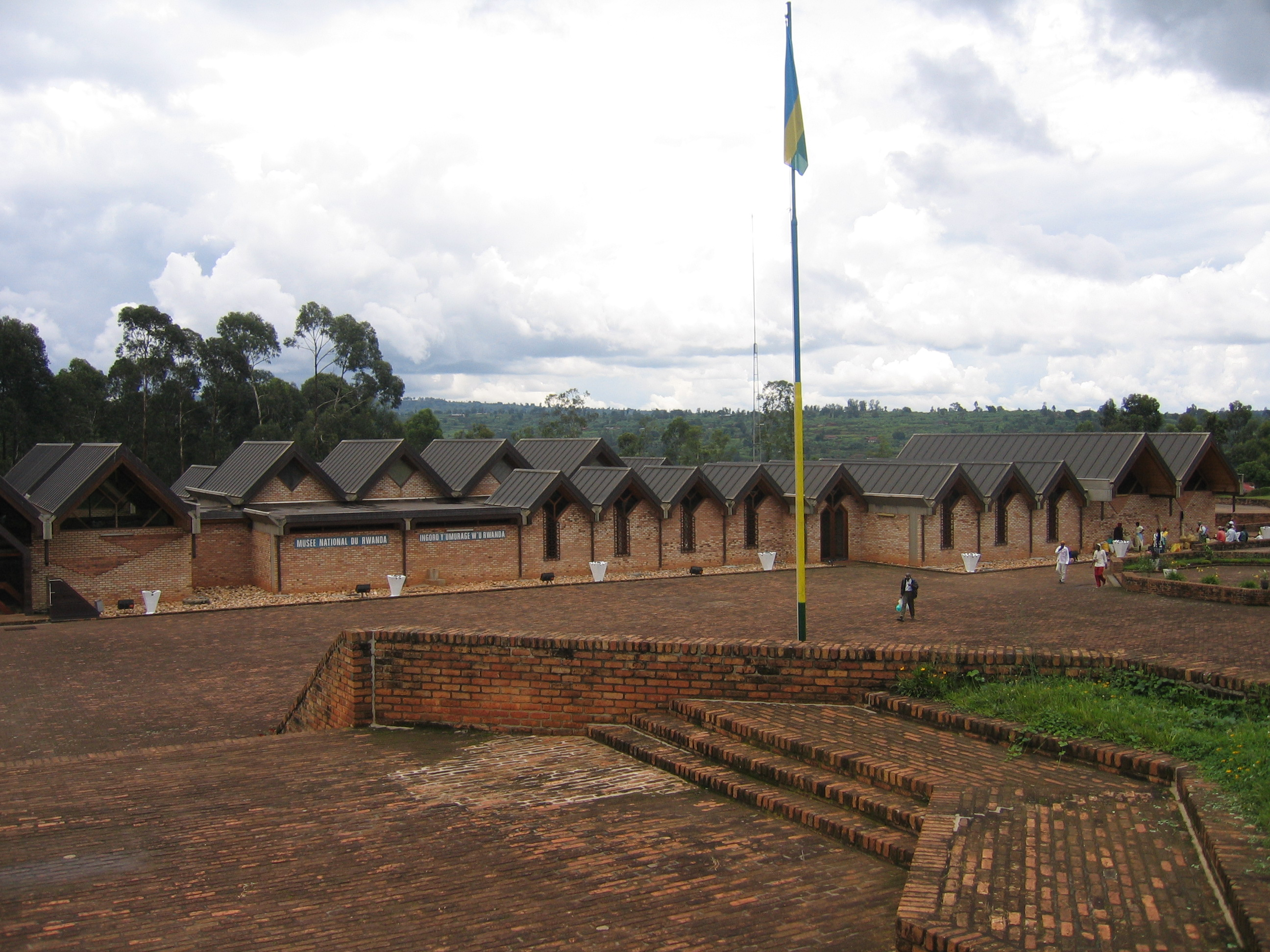
- The Ethnographic Museum when it was called the National Museum of Rwanda
- Former name: National Museum of Rwanda
- Established: 1989
- Location: Huye
- Coordinates: 2.5887°S 29.7451°E
- Type: Ethnographic

The Ethnographic Museum (Kinyarwanda: Inzu ndangamurage), formerly the National Museum of Rwanda (French: Musée national du Rwanda, Kinyarwanda: Ingoro y'Umurage w'u Rwanda), is a national museum in Rwanda. It is located in Butare. It is owned by Institute of National Museums of Rwanda.

It was built with help of the Belgian government and opened in 1989. It is also a good source of information on the cultural history of the country and the region. It is also known as the site of the murder of Queen Dowager Rosalie Gicanda and several others during the Rwandan genocide.
