= Campaign Against Genocide Museum =

Museum in Rwanda

Coordinates: 1.9526°S 30.0989°E

The Campaign Against Genocide Museum is one of the eight museums managed by the Rwanda Cultural Heritage Academy. It is housed in the Parliamentary building of Rwanda (the former Conseil National de Development) and was inaugurated in 2017 by Paul Kagame with an aim to showcase the history of Rwanda during the campaign against the genocide against the Tutsi.

Some memorials of the 1994 Genocide against the Tutsi in Rwanda.

== Background ==
The parliament building was chosen as the location for this museum because it housed 600 Rwanda Patriotic Army soldiers from December 1993 to 1994 as they were preparing for the formation of the Broad-Based Transitional Government and the National Transitional Assembly. Paul Kagame, the RPA Chairman of High Command, later, during the genocide against the Tutsi in Rwanda, ordered that the soldiers break out of their confinement to save thousands of Tutsi who were being killed.

The museum opened on 4 July 2014.

== Features ==
The main focus of the Campaign Against Genocide Museum is how the campaign against the genocide was planned and executed by the Rwanda Patriotic Army. The museum also highlights the role of the RPA. One key object of the museum's collection is a machine gun used by RPA armies to dissuade Hutu forces from entering the parliament building.
