= Kandt House Museum =

Museum in Kigali, Nyarugenge, Rwanda

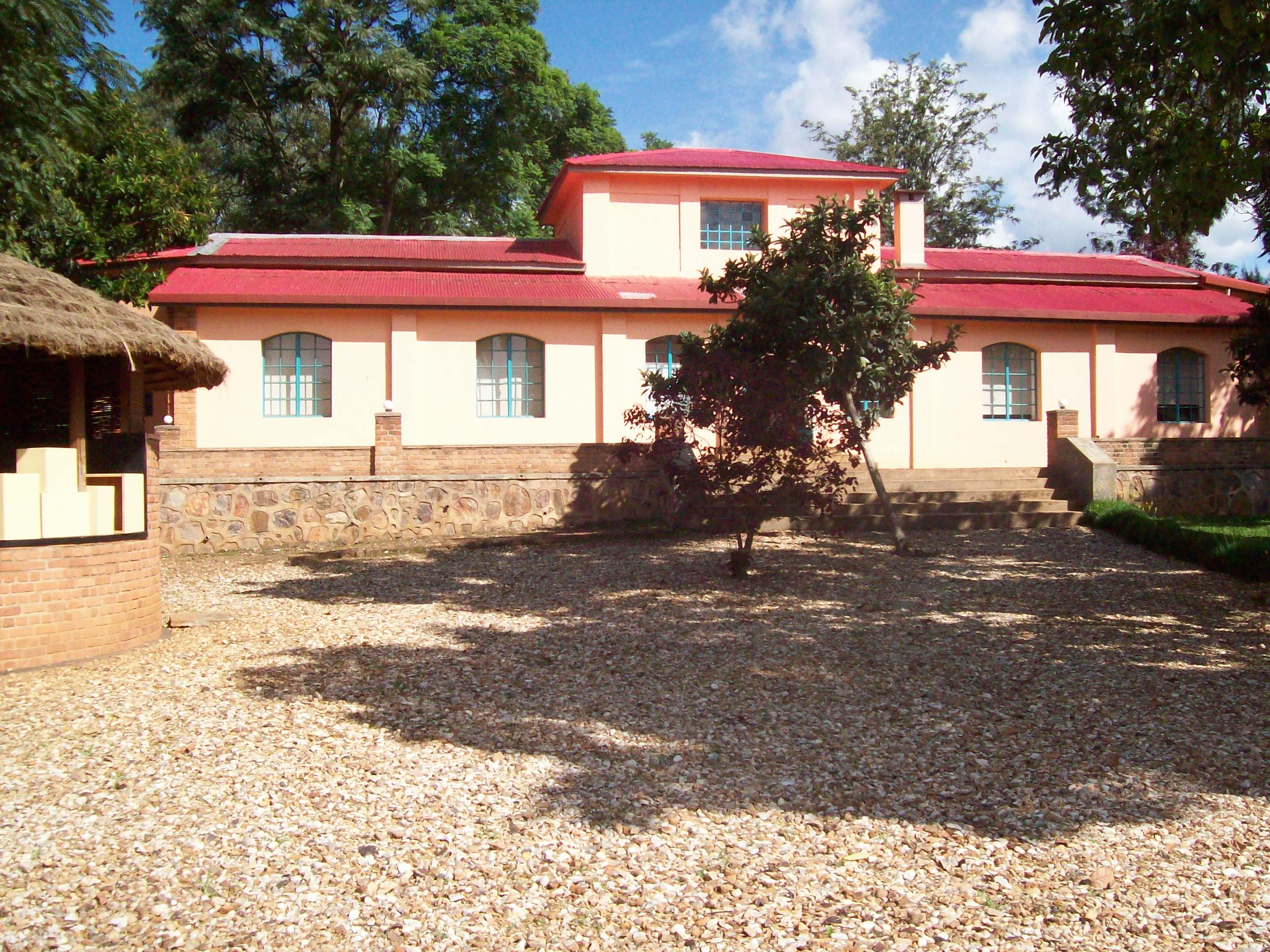
Kandt House Museum

The Kandt House Museum, formerly known as the Natural History Museum, is located in what is now the city of Kigali, Nyarugenge District, westbound. This location was chosen as the colonial capital in Rwanda of Germany in 1907 by a German resident (Administrator) Richard Kandt under the name of Nyarugenge.The name was changed to Kigali in 1908 because it was too difficult for the colonialists to pronounce. But the name

Then, under the idea of Richard Kandt, along with other colonial military leaders, the Rwandans began to build administrative buildings, including this museum building in 1908. This is the only remaining historical building from 1908. As such, the building was renovated in 2004 and turned into a natural history museum showcasing Rwanda's natural resources. Additionally, on 17 December 2017, the museum changed its name to the Kandt House Museum with a new exhibition showing the history of Rwanda before and within German colonization under the new name of the Kandt House Museum. There is also an additional exhibit of live reptiles such as Nile crocodiles, snakes such as black mamba, python, cobra, and others found in the Rwandan countryside.

This museum is under the Rwanda Cultural Heritage Academy.
