= Gisenyi Airport =

- IATA: GYI; ICAO: HRYG

Summary
- Airport type: Public, Civilian
- Owner: Rwanda Civil Aviation Authority
- Serves: Gisenyi, Rwanda
- Location: Gisenyi, Rwanda
- Elevation AMSL: 5,082 ft / 1,549 m
- Coordinates: 01°40′48″S 29°15′30″E

Map
- Location of Gisenyi Airport in Rwanda; Placement on map is approximate

Runways
Direction	Length		Surface
Direction	ft	m	Surface
02/20	3,330	1,010	Asphalt

Gisenyi Airport is an airport in Rwanda. It has IATA airport code GYI (not to be confused with North Texas Regional Airport with FAA location identifier GYI).

== Location ==
Gisenyi Airport (IATA: GYI, ICAO: HRYG), is a public airport located in Rwanda's Western Province, within Rubavu District, in the border town of Gisenyi, the airport lies at the International border with the Democratic Republic of the Congo. It is situated approximately 94 kilometres (58 mi), by air, northwest of Kigali International Airport, currently, the country's largest civilian airport. The geographic coordinates of this airport are:1° 40' 48.00"S, 29° 15' 30.00"E (Latitude:-1.680000; Longitude:29.258334).

== Overview ==
Gisenyi Airport is a medium-sized airport that serves the town of Gisenyi and the neighboring city of Goma, across the border in the Democratic Republic of the Congo. The two neighboring cities are also served by Goma Airport, which is very near the border with Rwanda - similar to Tijuana International Airport and Brown Field Municipal Airport which are separated by the United States - Mexico Border. Gisenyi Airport is one of the eight (8) public civilian airports under the administration of the Rwanda Civil Aviation Authority. Gisenyi Airport is situated at an altitude of 5,082 feet (1,549 m) above sea level. The airport has a single asphalt runway that measures 3,330 feet (1,010 m) long and 75 feet (23 m) wide.

== Airlines and destinations ==
RwandAir, the national carrier, operated a three weekly service between Gisenyi Airport and Kigali International Airport. However, as of June 2013 they no longer do so.

== See also ==
- Gisenyi
- Rubavu District
- Rwanda Civil Aviation Authority
