= Mwanza (disambiguation) =

Mwanza is a city in northwest Tanzania.

Mwanza may also refer to:

== People ==
- Mwanza Mukombo (1945–2001), Congolese footballer
- Billy Mwanza (born 1983), Zambian footballer
- Humphrey Mwanza (1949–2015), Zambian politician
- Leckford Mwanza Thotho (fl. 2009–2011), Malawian politician
- Peter Mwanza (born 1937), Malawian politician
- Pearson Mwanza (1968–1997), Zambia footballer
- Richard Mwanza (1959−1993), Zambian footballer
- Willard Mwanza (born 1997), Zambian footballer

== Places ==
=== Malawi ===
- Mwanza, Malawi, a town in southwestern Malawi
- Mwanza District, Southern Region, Malawi

=== Tanzania ===
- Mwanza Region, Tanzania
- Roman Catholic Archdiocese of Mwanza, Tanzania
- Mwanza Airport, outside Mwanza, Tanzania

== Other uses ==
- MV Mwanza, a Lake Victoria ferry

== See also ==
- Mwanza flat-headed rock agama, a lizard
- Mwanza frog (Xenopus victorianus)
