= Gisenyi =

Gisenyi Rubavu
- City
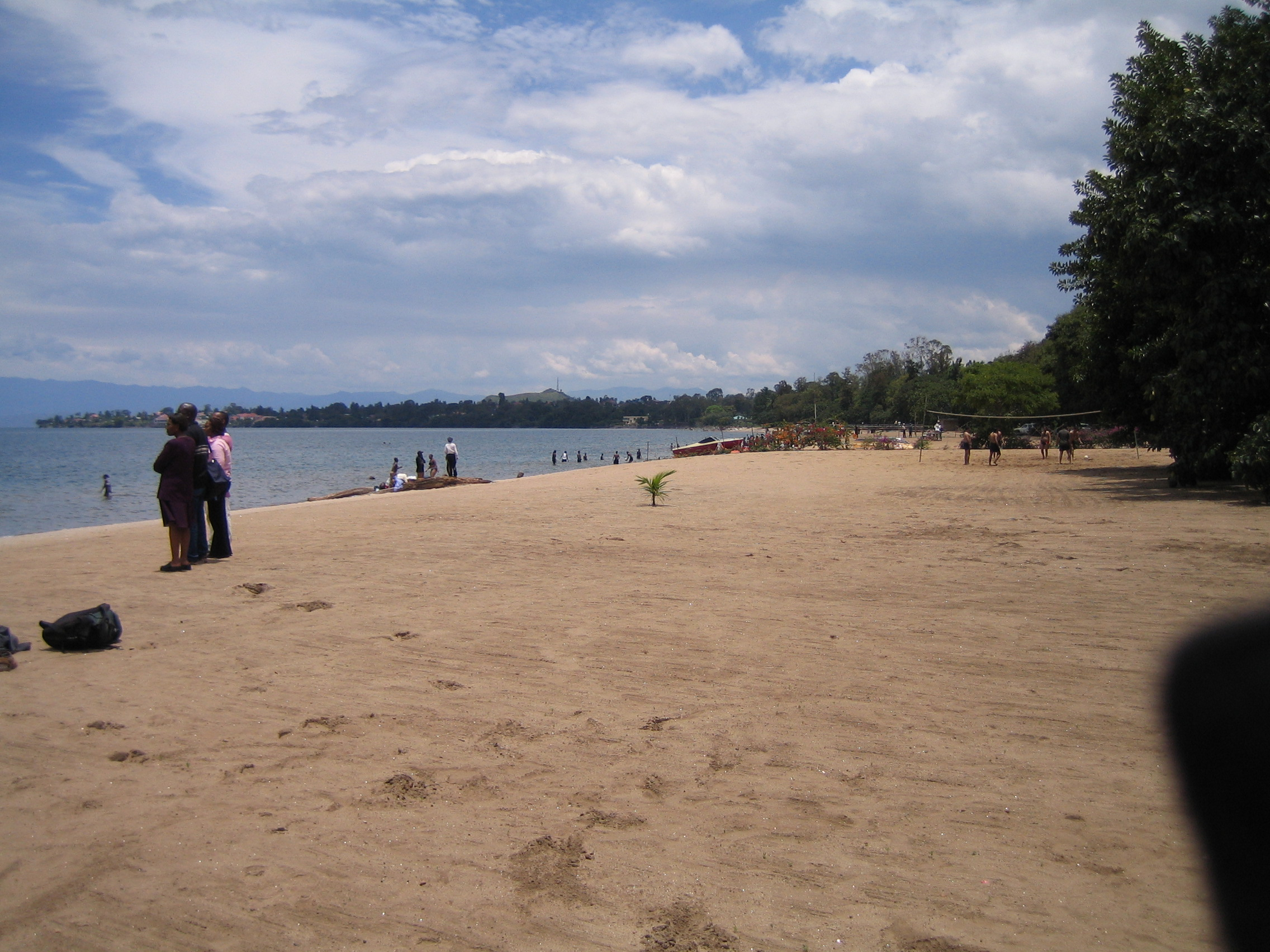
- Lake Kivu beach at Gisenyi

- Location in Rwanda
- Coordinates: 1°42′S 29°15′E
- Country: Rwanda
- Admin. Province: Western Province
- District: Rubavu

Area
  - Total: 11 km^{2} (4.2 sq mi)
- Elevation: 1,481 m (4,859 ft)

Population (2022 census)
  - Total: 252,090
  - Density: 23,000/km^{2} (59,000/sq mi)
- Climate: Aw

Gisenyi, historically rendered as Kisenyi, is the second largest city in Rwanda, located in the Rubavu district in Rwanda's Western Province.

== Overview ==
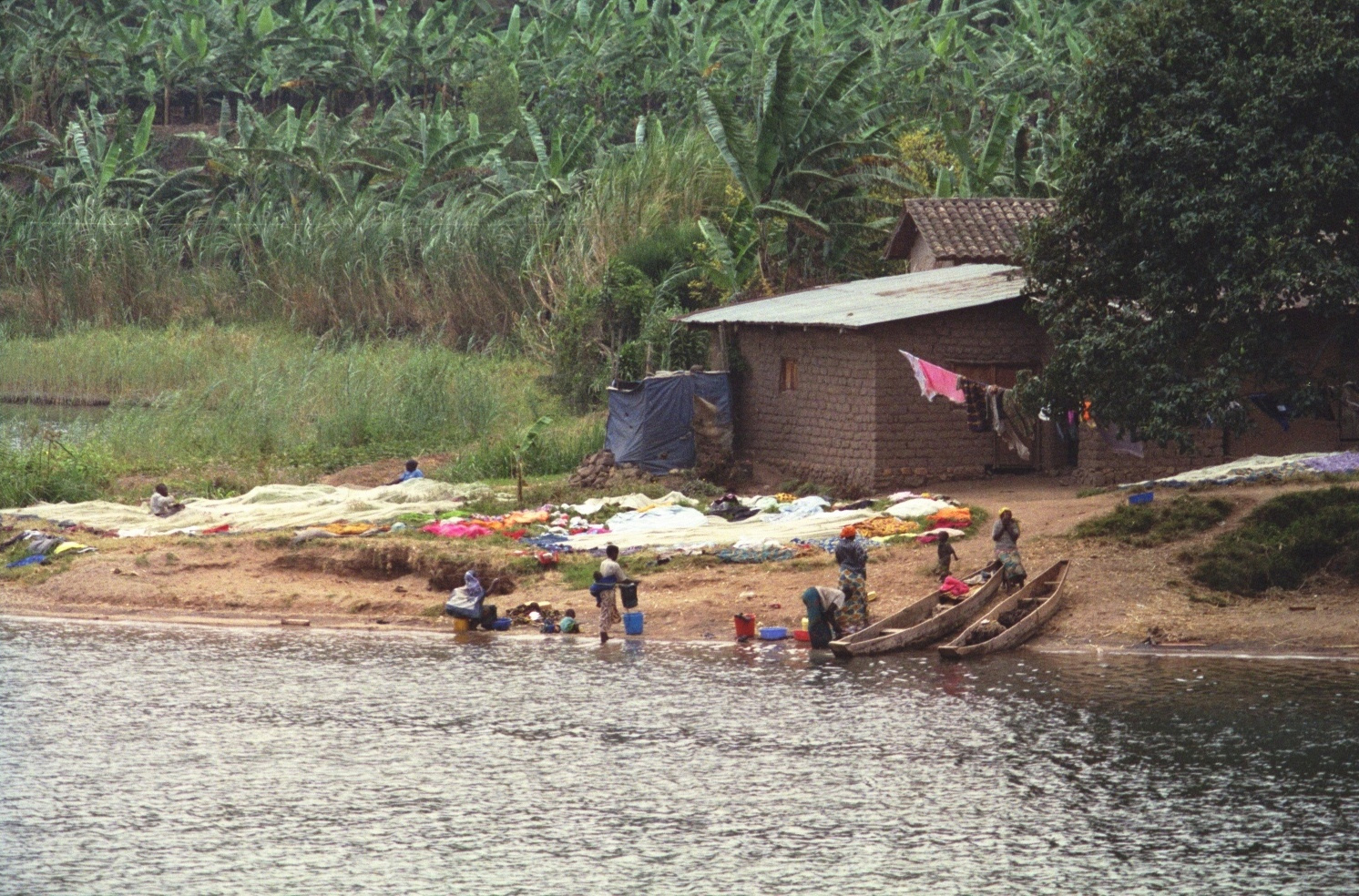
The shoreline at Gisenyi.

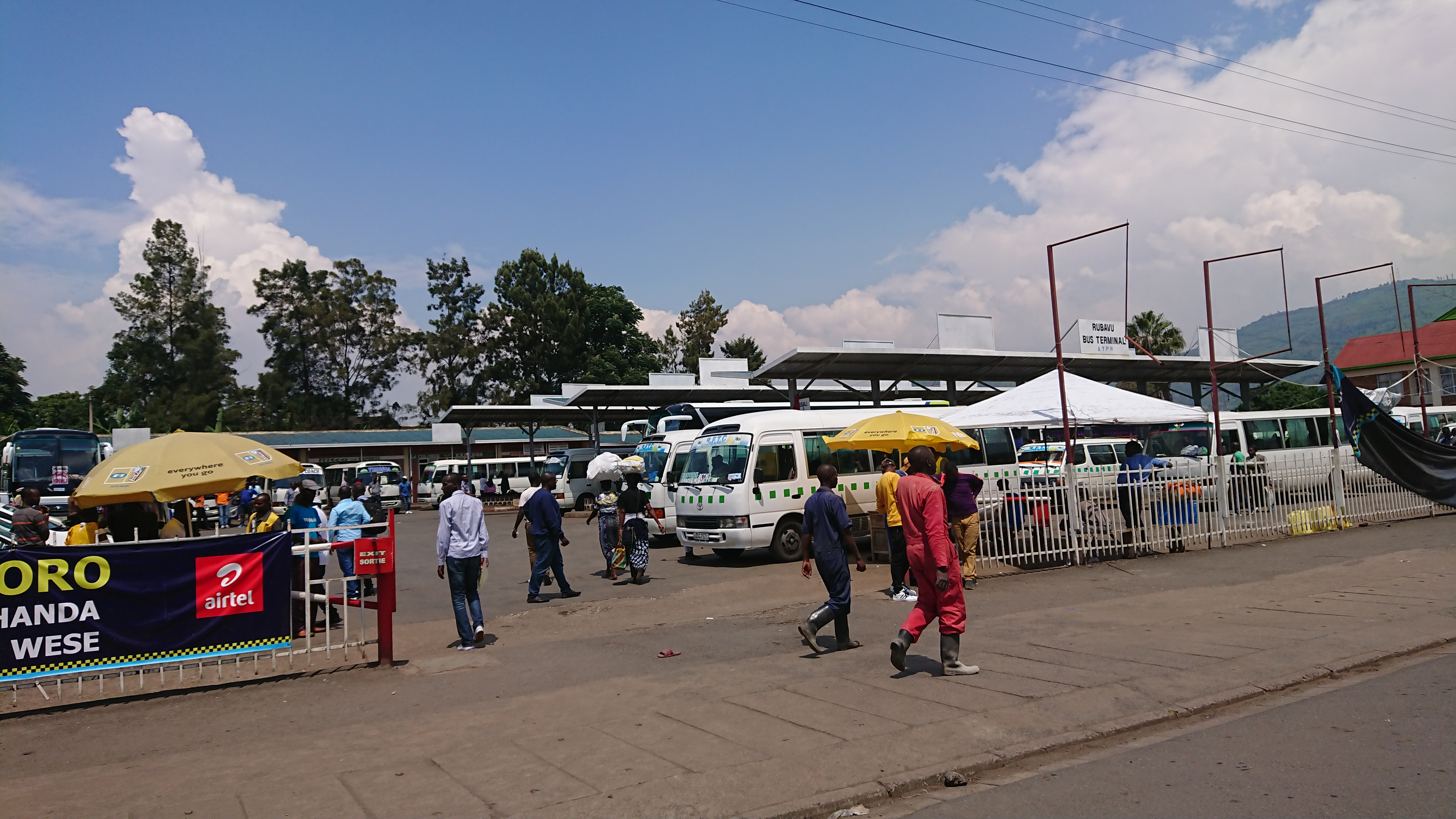
Taxi park at Gisenyi

The city features a resort on the shores of Lake Kivu, with several hotels and three sandy beaches. The area is also known for water sports. The northern shore of the lake on which Goma and Gisenyi lie is a flat plain featuring lava formations from the eruptions of nearby Mount Nyiragongo.

In contrast to Goma, Gisenyi escaped the lava flows of both the 1977 and the 2002 eruptions, which destroyed between 15 and 40% of the former. The centre of Gisenyi lies by foothills at the northeast corner of the lake, and low-density expansion is taking place in the hills, which are expected to be safe from future eruptions.

Gisenyi is also home to Bralirwa, which manufactures various local beers — Primus, Mützig, Amstel and Guinness — as well as a range of Coca-Cola–branded soft drinks. Gisenyi is a small town compared to neighbouring Goma in the DRC, though Gisenyi is growing quickly. In 2011, a new multistorey shopping mall began construction over an old bus station. As of 2011, the main roads of the town are paved, and sidewalks are nearing completion for most of them as well.

Gisenyi has two borders with Goma, the "Petite Barrière" and the "Grand Barrière". These names are a little misleading because the Petite Barrière is physically larger and features much higher traffic volumes. About 6,000 people crossed the Petite Barrière daily during 2011. On the Gisenyi side, a large customs and immigration office was built with a large capacity, not yet matched by the Congolese facilities. Similarly, the road to the Petite Barrière is paved on the Rwandan side but not on the Congolese side. The Grande Barrière is paved on both sides and receives more of the heavy truck traffic. It is also a diplomatic border.

During the Rwandan genocide, the provisional government was based in the city. Gisenyi is the city where Laurent Nkunda — accused by the United Nations of having led an army that illegally recruited Congolese child soldiers — is being held, pending a determination on the DRC's extradition request.

== Education ==
Gisenyi's campus of Kigali Independent University had an enrollment of 3413 students in the 2012-2013 academic year. The students were pursuing programs in the faculties of Economics and Business Studies, Social Sciences, and Law. University of tourism Technology and Business studies(UTB) previously called RTUC also has a Gisenyi campus. The town has about 30 public and private schools, including nursery, primary and secondary schools.

== Climate ==
Climate data for Gisenyi Airport (1991–2020)
Month	Jan	Feb	Mar	Apr	May	Jun	Jul	Aug	Sep	Oct	Nov	Dec	Year
Record high °C (°F)	29.5 (85.1)	31.6 (88.9)	32.1 (89.8)	29.3 (84.7)	30.6 (87.1)	28.4 (83.1)	28.4 (83.1)	29.6 (85.3)	30.3 (86.5)	29.9 (85.8)	28.5 (83.3)	28.9 (84.0)	32.1 (89.8)
Mean daily maximum °C (°F)	24.7 (76.5)	24.9 (76.8)	24.7 (76.5)	24.6 (76.3)	24.3 (75.7)	24.0 (75.2)	24.4 (75.9)	25.0 (77.0)	25.2 (77.4)	24.7 (76.5)	24.2 (75.6)	24.4 (75.9)	24.6 (76.3)
Daily mean °C (°F)	19.9 (67.8)	20.1 (68.2)	20.1 (68.2)	20.1 (68.2)	19.8 (67.6)	19.4 (66.9)	19.3 (66.7)	19.8 (67.6)	20.1 (68.2)	19.9 (67.8)	19.5 (67.1)	19.6 (67.3)	19.8 (67.6)
Mean daily minimum °C (°F)	15.1 (59.2)	15.2 (59.4)	15.6 (60.1)	15.6 (60.1)	15.4 (59.7)	14.7 (58.5)	14.1 (57.4)	14.6 (58.3)	14.9 (58.8)	15.0 (59.0)	14.7 (58.5)	14.9 (58.8)	15.0 (59.0)
Record low °C (°F)	12.2 (54.0)	11.9 (53.4)	12.4 (54.3)	12.7 (54.9)	12.5 (54.5)	11.2 (52.2)	9.9 (49.8)	11.1 (52.0)	11.8 (53.2)	11.8 (53.2)	12.2 (54.0)	12.3 (54.1)	9.9 (49.8)
Average precipitation mm (inches)	93.0 (3.66)	82.3 (3.24)	140.5 (5.53)	129.2 (5.09)	91.9 (3.62)	67.8 (2.67)	21.4 (0.84)	84.9 (3.34)	115.6 (4.55)	142.2 (5.60)	154.5 (6.08)	109.0 (4.29)	1,232.4 (48.52)
Average precipitation days (≥ 1.0 mm)	12.7	12.2	17.8	17.4	11.7	5.1	2.1	6.7	14.0	17.7	20.1	16.8	154.2
Source: NOAA

== See also ==
- Nyamyumba Hot Springs
