= Huye District =

Coordinates: 2°31′S 29°42′E

- District
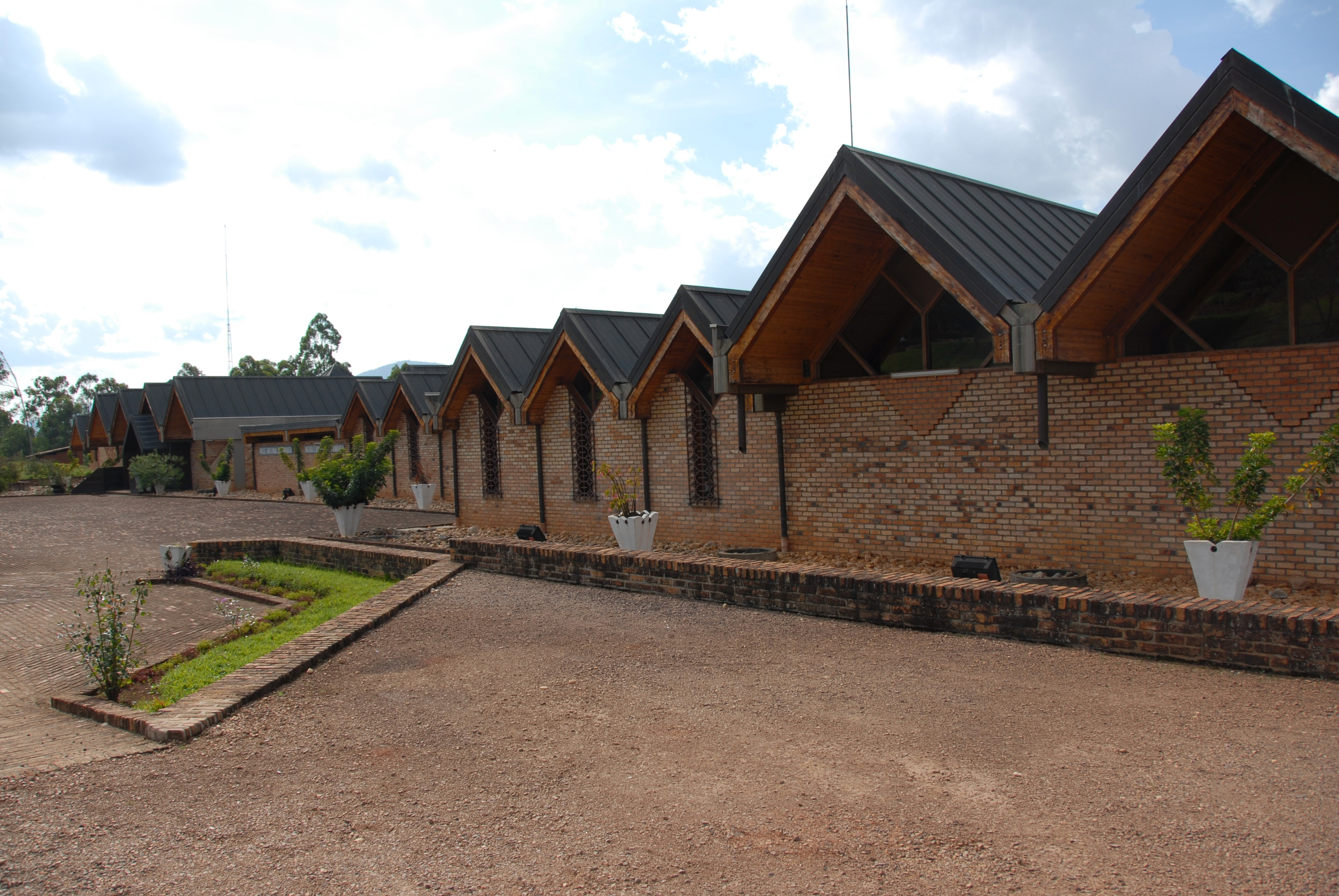
- The Ethnographic Museum in Butare

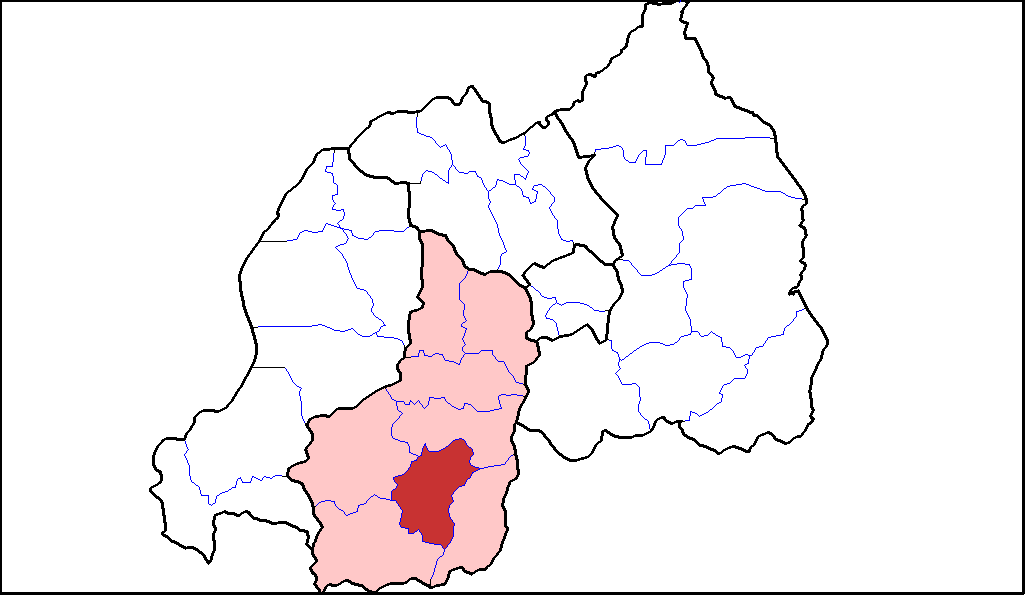
- Shown within Southern Province and Rwanda
- Country: Rwanda
- Prefecture: Southern
- Capital: Butare

Area
  - District: 581.6 km^{2} (224.6 sq mi)

Population (2022 census)
  - District: 381,900
  - Density: 656.6/km^{2} (1,701/sq mi)
  - Urban: 79,744
  - Rural: 302,156

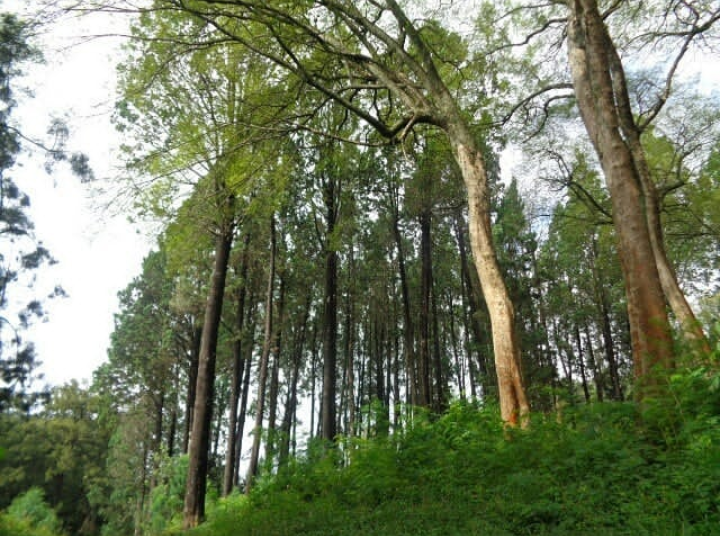
Arboretum forest, 200 hectares of forest planted by the Belgians in 1934

Huye is one of the eight districts (Akarere) that make up Rwanda's Southern Province. It has a total surface area of 581.6 square Kilometers. It has fourteen sectors and 77 cells with a total of 508 umudugudus (villages) in total. The district has a population of 381,900, with an average of 660 inhabitants per square kilometer. The largest city in the province is Butare.

== Geography and education ==
Huye borders with Nyanza district in the North, Gisagara in the east and south, Nyaruguru in the south west and Nyamagabe in the north west. The hilly landscape protrudes from east to west but develops into a steep hilly and mountainous area as one moves towards the west and north west. The western part of the district has tall undulating mountains, including the famous Huye mountain. The district has rainfall a distribution pattern of 1.200 mm and an average climate of 19 °C.

Huye was previously home to the National University of Rwanda, the oldest university in the country, but in 2013 it was merged with other universities in Rwanda to form the University of Rwanda.

The Ethnographic Museum which is home to Rwanda's cultural and historic heritage is also located in the district, also located in Butare. The museum houses some of the remains of last known Rwandan kings surrounded by some of the most ancient tools and traditional hardware.

=== Sectors ===
Huye district is divided into 14 sectors (imirenge): Gishamvu, Karama, Kigoma, Kinazi, Maraba, Mbazi, Mukura, Ngoma, Ruhashya, Huye, Rusatira, Rwaniro, Simbi and Tumba.
