= Butare =

Butare City
- City
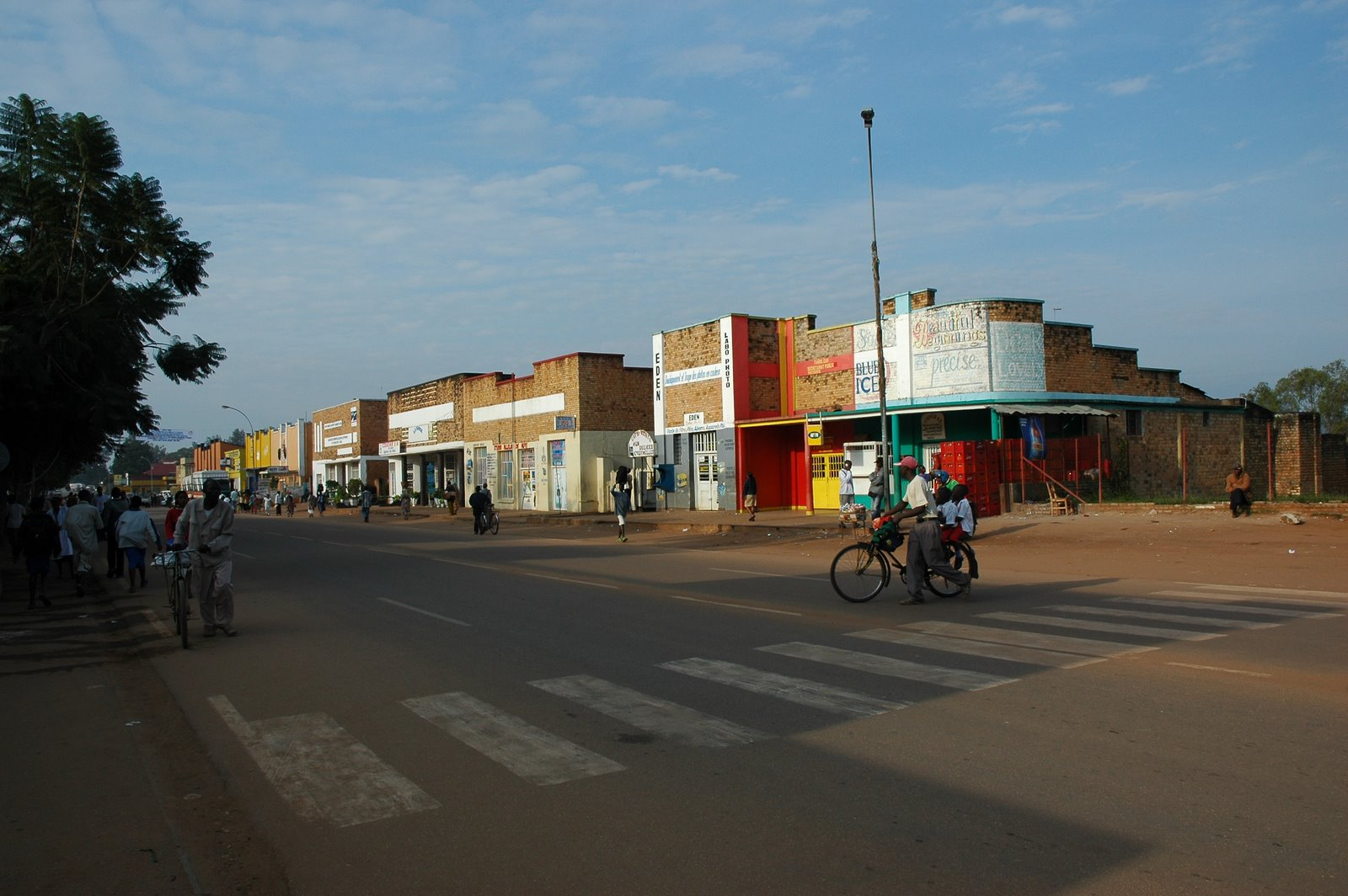
- Butare City

- Location in Rwanda
- Coordinates: 2°36′S 29°45′E
- Country: Rwanda
- Admin. division: Southern Province

Population (2022 census)
  - Total: 62,823

Butare (Kinyarwanda: [βú.tɑ́.ɾe]), also known as Huye and formerly known as Astrida, is a city with a population of 62,823 (2022 census) in the Southern Province of Rwanda and the capital of Huye district. It is the seventh largest town in Rwanda by population.

== History ==
The Belgian colonial rulers established it in the 1920s and named the city Astrida, in honour of Queen Astrid of the Belgians. The government of Rwanda changed the name of the city when it gained independence in 1962.

== Climate ==
Climate data for Butare (1961–1990)
Month	Jan	Feb	Mar	Apr	May	Jun	Jul	Aug	Sep	Oct	Nov	Dec	Year
Mean daily maximum °C (°F)	24.6 (76.3)	24.9 (76.8)	24.8 (76.6)	24.1 (75.4)	23.9 (75.0)	24.5 (76.1)	25.1 (77.2)	26.2 (79.2)	26.0 (78.8)	25.2 (77.4)	24.1 (75.4)	24.1 (75.4)	24.8 (76.6)
Mean daily minimum °C (°F)	14.4 (57.9)	14.5 (58.1)	14.7 (58.5)	14.8 (58.6)	14.9 (58.8)	14.1 (57.4)	13.9 (57.0)	14.7 (58.5)	14.5 (58.1)	14.4 (57.9)	14.1 (57.4)	14.3 (57.7)	14.4 (58.0)
Average rainfall mm (inches)	114.4 (4.50)	105.8 (4.17)	131.2 (5.17)	215.2 (8.47)	126.8 (4.99)	31.6 (1.24)	7.7 (0.30)	36.3 (1.43)	84.3 (3.32)	123.2 (4.85)	148.9 (5.86)	118.3 (4.66)	1,243.7 (48.96)
Average rainy days (≥ 0.1 mm)	15	14	17	23	15	4	1	4	13	17	21	17	161
Source: World Meteorological Organization

== Education ==
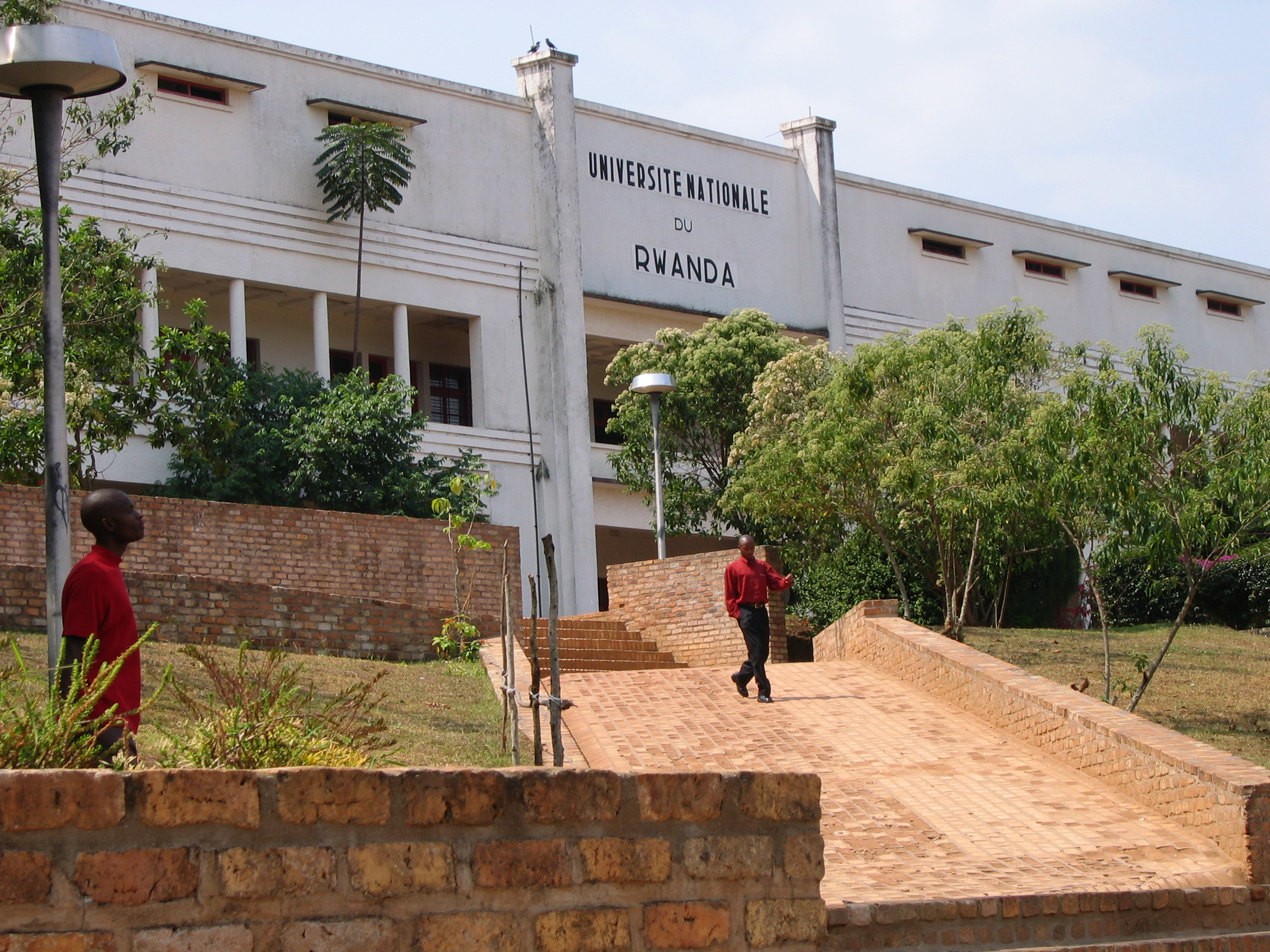
University of Rwanda Butare campus.

The University of Rwanda Butare campus was founded in 2013. Before that, the Butare campus went by the name of National University of Rwanda subsequent its foundation in 1963. Due to the large number of university students and student-centered activities in the city, Butare is often regarded as a university city. It also held the Nyakibanda Seminary and the Rwandan National Institute of Scientific Research.

The city of Butare has long been regarded as the intellectual capital of the country, while Kigali holds most political power.

The Groupe Scolaire Officiel de Butare is the largest secondary school in Rwanda.

== Culture ==
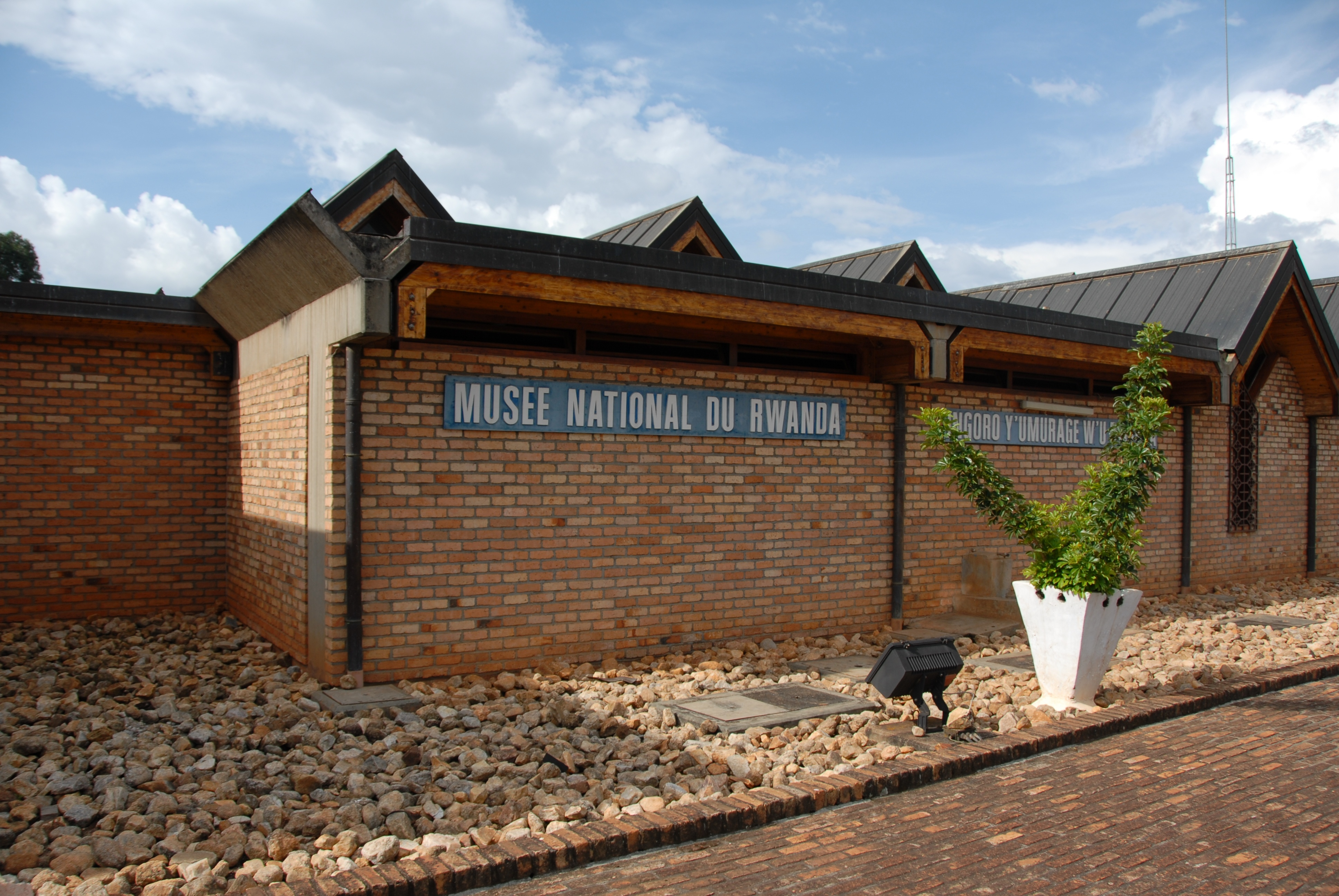
The Ethnographic Museum at Butare.

The Ethnographic Museum was built in the early 1990s and is a source of information on the cultural history of the country and the region.

== Sports ==
The city has one professional football team competing in the top-flight of Rwanda football – Mukura Victory Sports, currently playing in the Rwanda Premier League. It plays its home games at Stade Huye.

== Places of worship ==
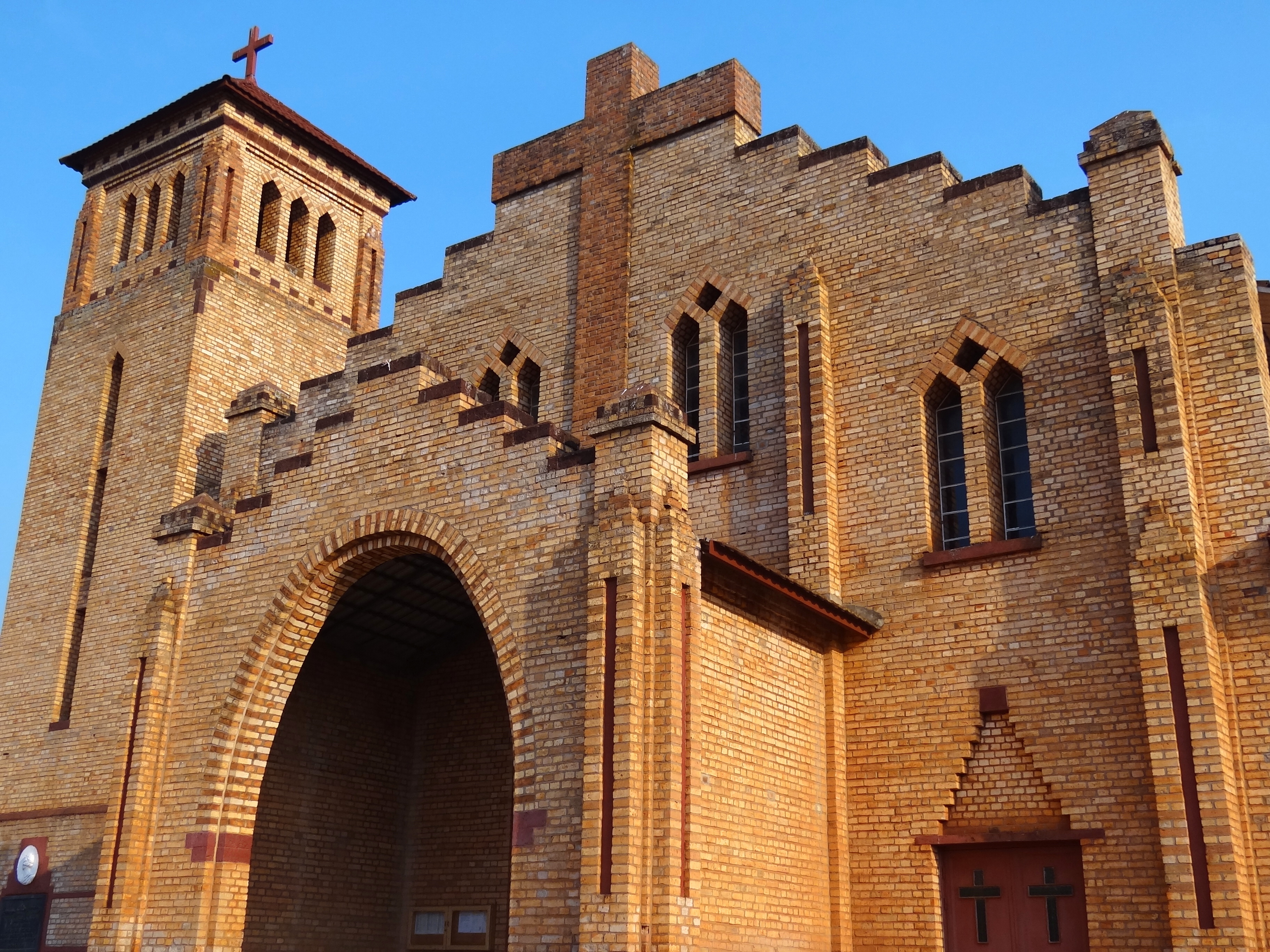
Cathedral of Our Lady of Wisdom at Butare.

Among the places of worship, they are predominantly Christian churches and temples : Roman Catholic Diocese of Butare (Catholic Church), (Lutheran Church of Rwanda (Lutheran World Federation), the Anglican Church of Rwanda (Anglican Communion), Union of Baptist Churches in Rwanda (Baptist World Alliance), Assemblies of God, Church of the Nazarene. There are also Muslim mosques.

== Transportation ==
The city is served by Butare Airport, a small civilian airport, administered by the Rwanda Civil Aviation Authority.

== Notable residents ==
- Pierre Célestin Munyanshongore (1942-2011), Engineer and educationalist
