= Rwanda Cultural Heritage Academy =

Rwandan governmental organization

Agency overview
- Formed: 2020
- Jurisdiction: Government of Rwanda
- Headquarters: Huye district , Rwanda
- Agency executives: Director-general, Robert Masozera
- Website: Homepage

The Rwanda Cultural Heritage Academy (RCHA) is the governmental organization of the Rwanda for cultural heritage. It was established by Presidential Decree No. 082/01 of August 28, 2020 as a merger of three institutions: the Rwanda Academy of Language and Culture, the Institute of National Museums of Rwanda and the Rwanda Archives and Library Services.

Robert Masozera has been the Director General since November 11, 2020. The agency's headquarters are located in the Huye district in the Southern Province of Rwanda.

The mission of the Rwanda Cultural Heritage Academy is to protect and promote the culture and language of Rwanda (Kinyarwanda). To this end, it collects, preserves and publicly exhibits objects of national cultural and natural heritage and Rwandan history, promotes cultural activities and oversees museums, archives, libraries and historical sites.

== See also ==
- List of museums in Rwanda
