= Rwanda Civil Aviation Authority =

Civil aviation authority of Rwanda

The Rwanda Civil Aviation Authority (RCAA, Kinyarwanda: Ikigo cy'Igihugu gishinzwe iby'indege za gisiviri, French: Office Rwandais de l'Aviation Civile) is the civil aviation authority of Rwanda. Its headquarters are at Kigali International Airport in Kigali. The authority was established as the Civil Aviation Authority by Law No. 21/2004 of 10/08/2004, replacing the Rwanda Airport Authority, which had been established in 1986. The later Law No. 44/2006 of 05/10/2006 reworked the organization as the RCAA.
