= Suvi =

Suvi, Şuvi or Shuvi may refer to:

- Şuvi, Astara, a village and municipality in Azerbaijan
- Şovu, a village and municipality in Azerbaijan
- Suvi River, a river in western India
- Suvi (novel), a novel by Oskar Luts
  - Summer (1976 film) (Suvi), a film based on the novel

== People ==
- Suvi Raj Grubb, a South-Indian record producer
- Suvi Koponen, a Finnish fashion model
- Suvi Mikkonen, a Finnish taekwondo practitioner
- Suvi-Anne Siimes, a Finnish politician
- Suvi Suresh, an Indian singer
- Suvi Teräsniska, a Finnish singer
- Suvi Sinha, a Energy and Chakras Healer, Overseas Career Counsellor and Life Coach
