= Maraba coffee =

Brewed beverage

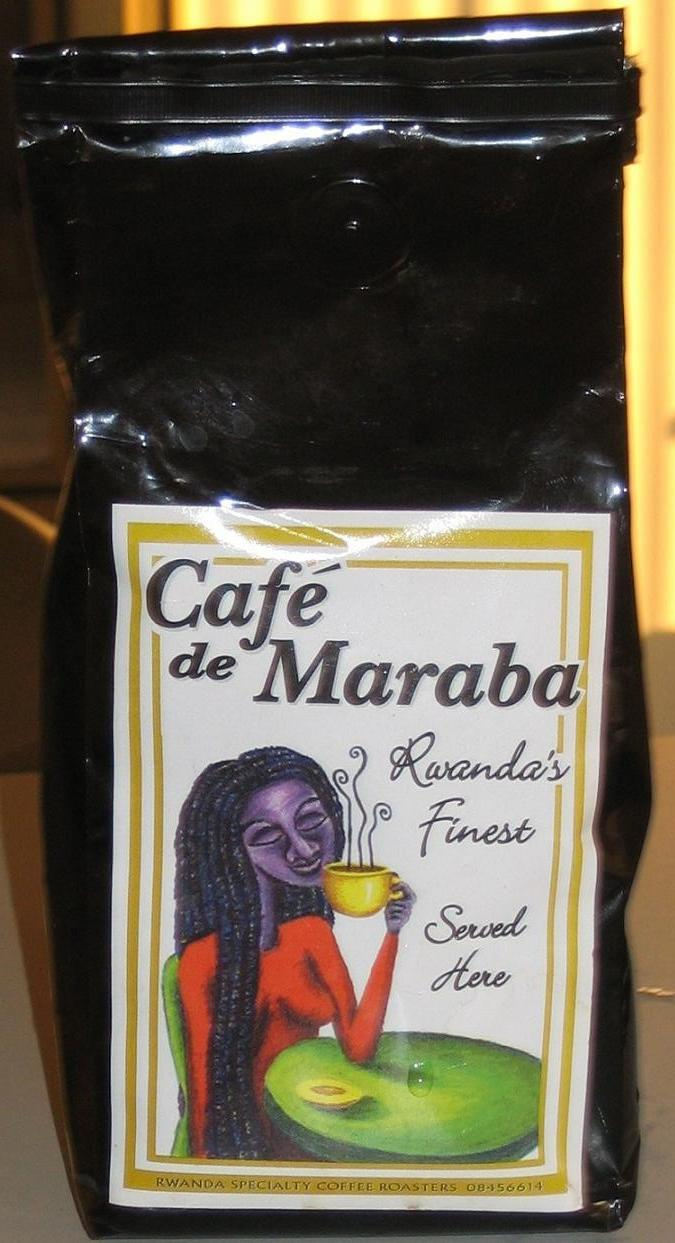
- Type: Hot or ice-cold (usually hot)
- Origin: Huye District
- Introduced: 21st century
- Color: Black, dark brown, light brown, beige

Maraba coffee (Kinyarwanda: Ikawa ya Maraba; French: Café de Maraba) is grown in the Maraba area of southern Rwanda. Maraba's coffee plants are the Bourbon variety of the Coffea arabica species and are grown on fertile volcanic soils on high-altitude hills. The fruit is handpicked, mostly during the rainy season between March and May, and brought to a washing station in Maraba, where the coffee beans are extracted and dried. At several stages, the beans are sorted according to quality. The farmers receive credits based on the quantity and quality of the beans they produce.

The beans are sold to various roasting companies, including Union Coffee Roasters of the United Kingdom who produce a Fairtrade-certified brand, and Community Coffee of the United States. Rwanda Smallholder Specialty Coffee Company (RWASHOSCCO) buys from Maraba and sells to the domestic market. Maraba coffee is also brewed into a beer.

About 1,600 smallholder farmers grow the coffee plants under the Abahuzamugambi cooperative, founded in 1999. Since 2000, the cooperative has been supported by the National University of Rwanda (UNR) and the Partnership for Enhancing Agriculture in Rwanda through Linkages (PEARL). The cooperative has improved coffee quality and penetrated the speciality market.

== History ==
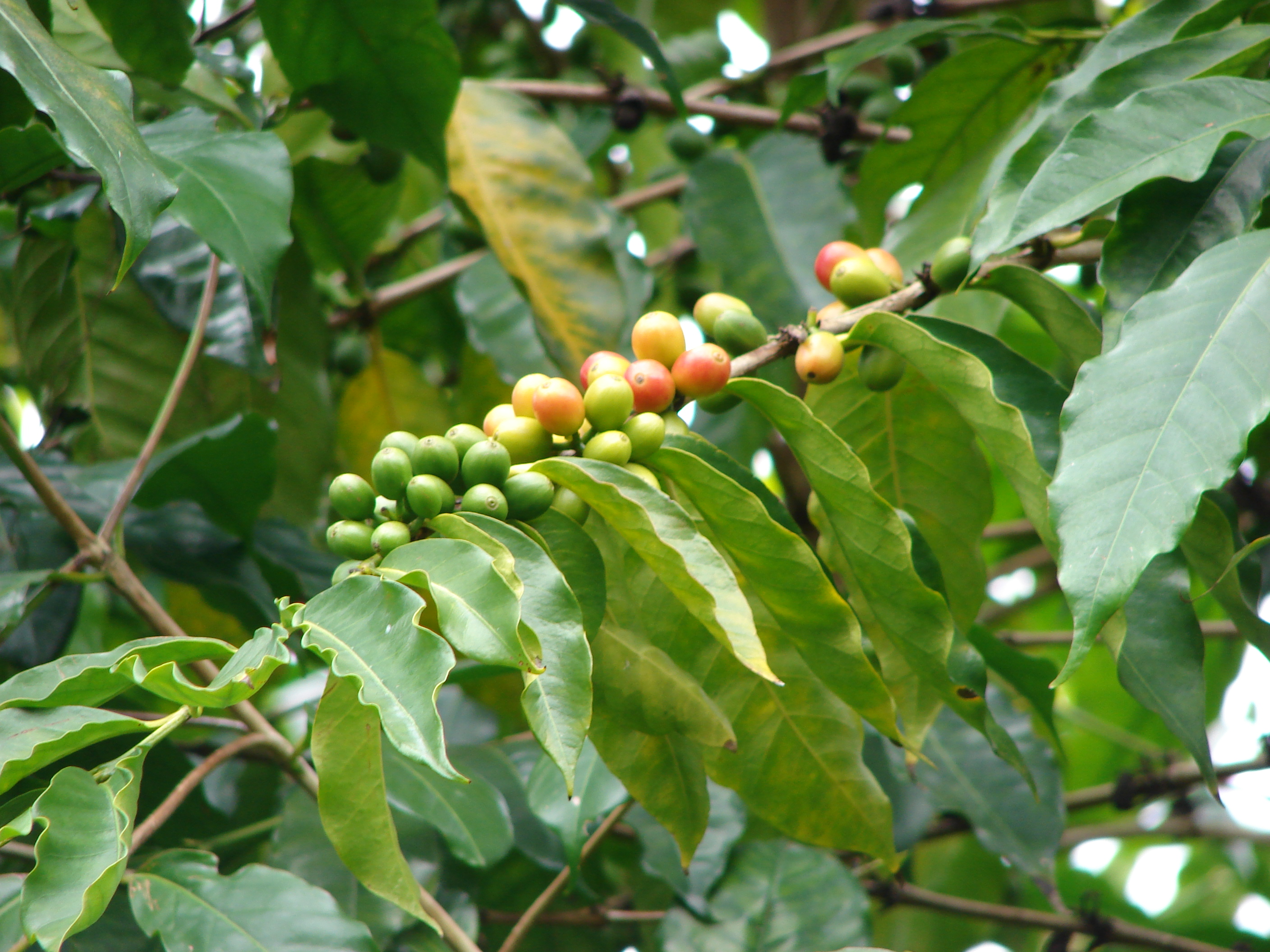
Coffee beans on plant

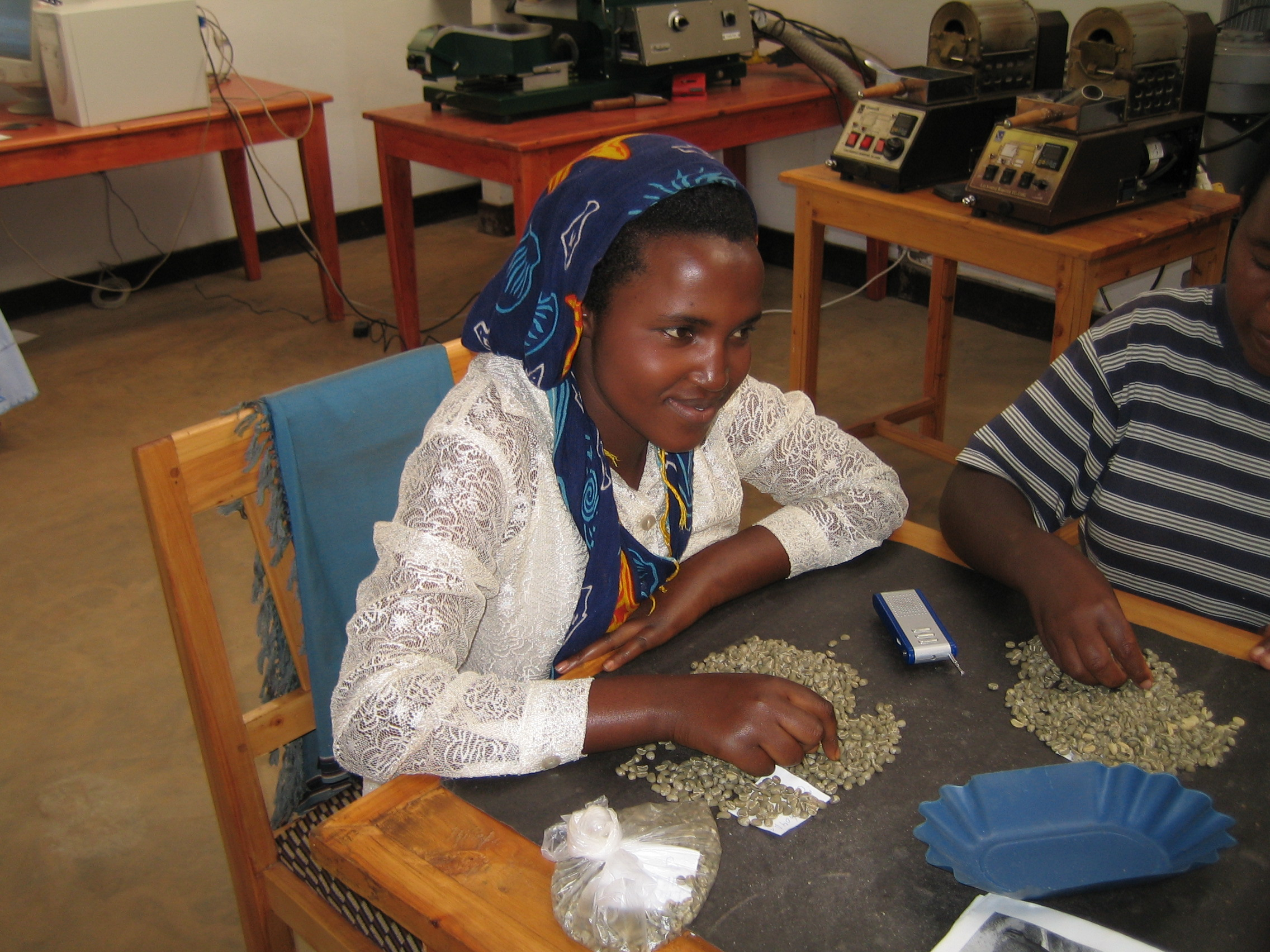
Maraba beans are sorted by hand, according to quality.

=== Origins ===
Rwandans have been growing coffee since colonial times, but until 1999 the product was classed below Grade C, making it unsellable on the global markets. The farmers did not have the means to wash and prepare their coffee cherries to specifications in a timely manner. Buyers paid US$0.33 per kilogram, a price that kept the farmers poor.

In 1999, 220 coffee growers formed an association in the Maraba District (part of the former Butare Province) to tackle this problem. Many of these farmers had lost family members during the 1994 genocide, while others had husbands in prison, accused of participating in the killings and due to face trial in the traditional gacaca courts. They named the association Abahuzamugambi, a Kinyarwanda word for people who work together to achieve a goal. The farmers hoped that by forming the association, they would increase revenue by selling directly to exporters in Kigali instead of through an intermediary transport company. They divided their profits and used them to buy tools, fertilisers and seeds to increase yields.

In 2000, the mayor of Maraba requested development aid from the National University of Rwanda (UNR), based in nearby Butare; the following year UNR helped found the Partnership for Enhancing Agriculture in Rwanda through Linkages (PEARL). Several entities supported the PEARL project: USAID, Michigan State University, Texas A&M University and various Rwandan bodies including UNR, Institut des Sciences Agronomiques du Rwanda (ISAR) and the Kigali Institute of Science, Technology and Management (KIST). PEARL started working with Abahuzamugambi in February 2001 to improve the coffee quality to standards required by the speciality coffee market in the United States.

The coffee farmers of Maraba first needed a washing station to remove the slimy sugar-rich outer coating of the coffee bean, under the skin. If this sugar is not removed within 12 hours of picking, it may ferment, and the flavour of the coffee is then impaired. They built the first station in July 2001 in the Cyarumbo sector, close to the main road, with funding from UNR, the Office des Cultures Industrielles du Rwanda (OCIR-Café), ACDI/VOCA, and the national agricultural research institute ISAR. The opening was late in the harvest season, so only 200 kilograms (441 lb) of that year's harvest were suitable for washing. However, the results were reasonably good, and the station was upgraded to allow more coffee to be processed in 2002. To bring mineral water from Mount Huye to the upgraded station, ACDI/VOCA helped fund a pipeline, which opened in March 2002.

A new certification system was introduced for the 2002 harvest to ensure that beans brought to the station were of suitable quality. Around half of the Abahuzamugambi membership attained the certification, which allowed the cooperative to look for serious buyers in the speciality markets of Europe and North America.

=== International acceptance ===
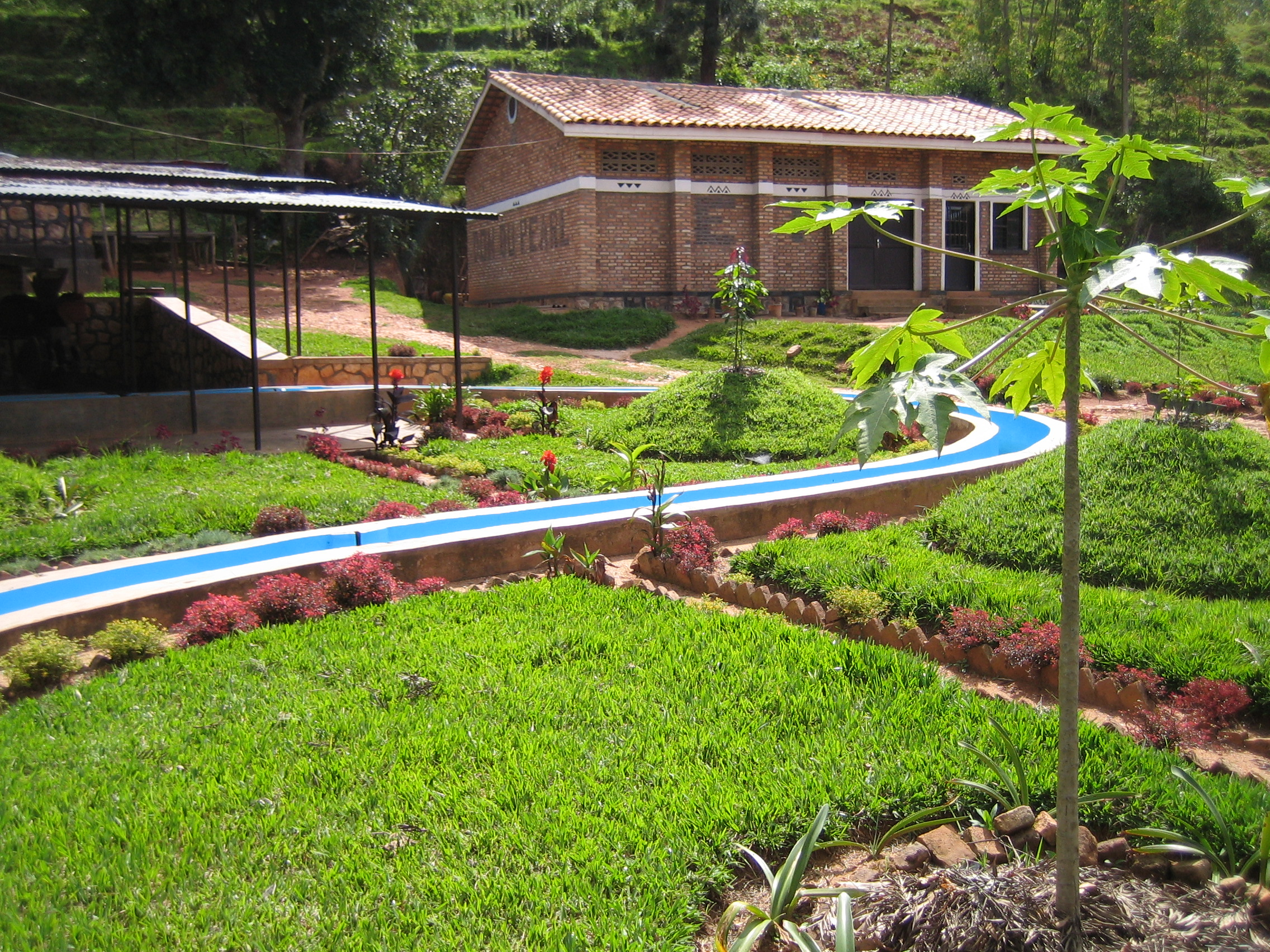
The Cyarumbo washing station

PEARL brought a speciality coffee expert to Rwanda, who put them in touch with a seller, Louisiana-based Community Coffee, to help market Maraba. They sent samples to Louisiana, and in June 2002 a representative from Community visited Maraba. Rwandan president Paul Kagame was also present, as the government placed great importance on the project. Community purchased an 18,000-kilogram (40,000 lb) container of Maraba beans at the above-average rate of US$3 per kilogram. The beans were transported to Louisiana, where they were roasted and blended into one of the company's gourmet coffees. This was the first direct contract between an American roaster and an African coffee cooperative.

Comic Relief also took an interest in Maraba. The 2001 Red Nose Day campaign had brought in £55 million for projects in the UK and Africa, some of which they pledged to the Association des Veuves du Genocide (AVEGA), an association of widows of the 1994 Rwandan genocide. The charity discovered that many of the Maraba smallholders were also members of AVEGA and could thus provide funding and support. They contacted Union Coffee Roasters (UCR), a British roasting company, whose representatives visited Maraba in 2002 with officials from the Fairtrade Labelling Organisation (FLO). This group inspected the Maraba site and granted certification, making Maraba coffee the first Rwandan cooperative to gain Fairtrade status. UCR described the coffee as containing "sparkling citrus flavours complemented by deep, sweet chocolate notes" and bought all the remaining produce from the 2002 harvest.

UCR distributed its Maraba coffee in early 2003 via Sainsbury's supermarkets, which sold the product in all 350 of its stores in the run up to that year's Red Nose Day. In 2003, the Abahuzamugambi Cooperative made US$35,000 in net profits. Of this, 70 percent was divided among the farmers at US$0.75 per kilogram provided, an amount more than three times that paid to other coffee growers in Rwanda and sufficient to pay for health care and education services which were not previously affordable. The remaining 30 percent was invested back into the cooperative and spent on buying calcium carbonate, an agricultural lime used to reduce acidity in the soil caused by runoff containing minerals after rainfall.

=== Independence ===
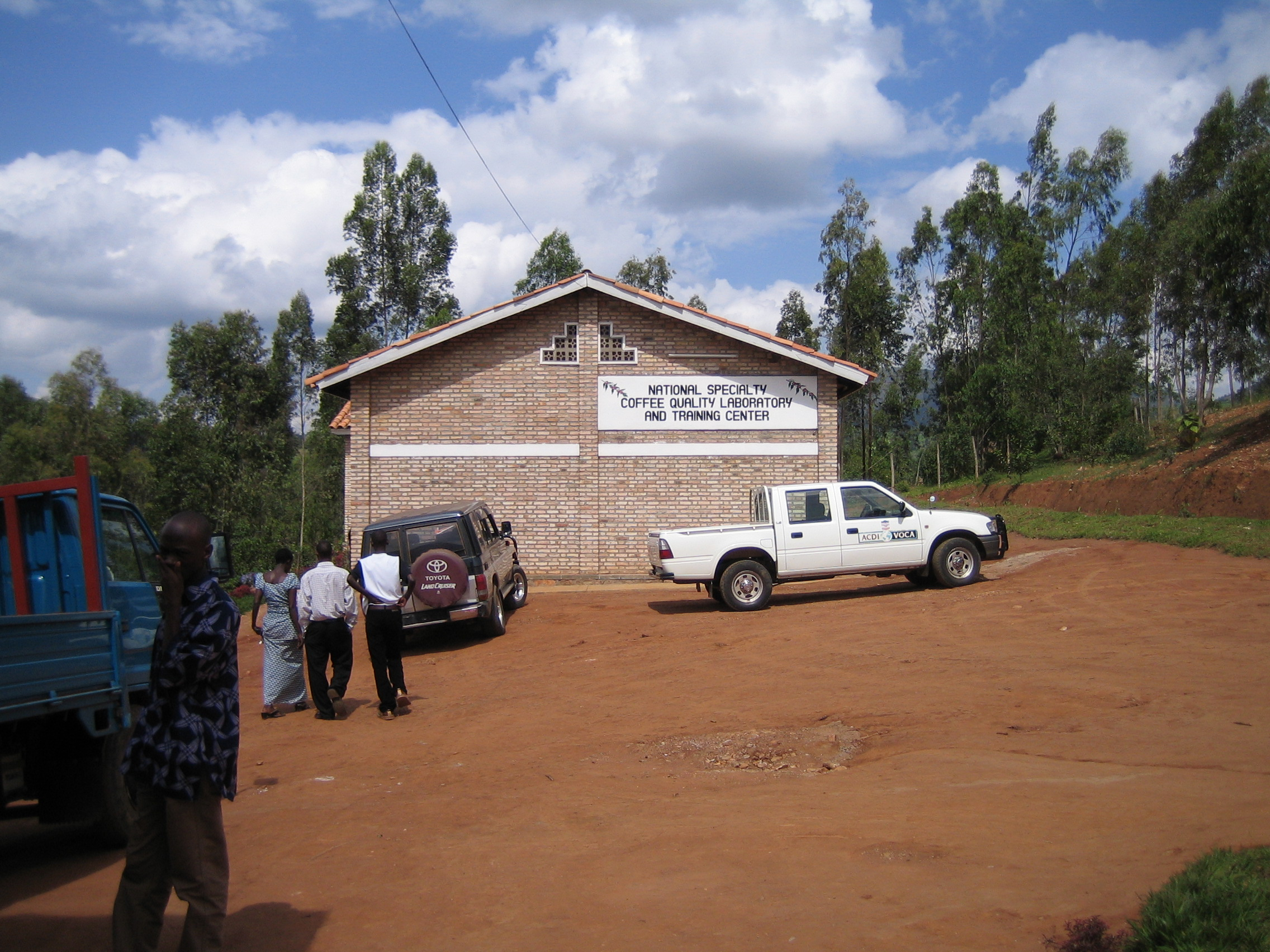
The quality laboratory in Kizi, Maraba

Beginning in 2003, PEARL deemed the operation self-sufficient and reduced financial support for the Abahuzamugambi Cooperative. The cooperative provided its growers with loans that helped improve living standards and allowed for livestock investments, affordable medical insurance, and education. A cooperative bank was opened in the village in March, enabling farmers to maintain and manage their own funds locally, rather than having to trek the long distance to Butare.

In late 2004, London-based Meantime Brewing began offering a coffee beer made out of beans grown in Maraba. The drink was intended as an alcoholic iced cappuccino or digestif. The head brewer tasted coffees from around the world but decided that the hints of vanilla and chocolate in Maraba coffee made it more suitable than the nutty and bitter coffees from South America. The original beer had an alcohol content of 4 percent and the same caffeine content as coffee, and was described as having a "silky, velvety character". It was sold in larger branches of Sainsbury's and in some pubs and clubs. The beverage was one of only two Fairtrade beers available on the UK market until 2006, when a reduction in the proportion of coffee and an increased alcohol content (now 6 percent) cost it its Fairtrade status, although it was still made using Maraba beans. At the time of its launch, Meantime Coffee Porter was the only coffee beer available in the British Isles, and it won the gold medal for the coffee-flavoured beer category at the 2006 World Beer Cup.

As the cooperative grew, it built additional washing stations across the area. The first of these was located at Kabuye and opened in 2004. The third station, at Sovu, became operational one year later in 2005, and the fourth, at Kibingo, in 2007.

In 2006, the Swedish Minister for Development Co-operation and Deputy Minister for Foreign Affairs, Carin Jamtin, visited Maraba to extend cooperation between Sweden and Rwanda and expose Maraba coffee to the Swedish speciality market. In July 2006, a telecentre was opened in Maraba under the coordination of PEARL. USAID, UNR and Washington State University (WSU) Extension's Center to Bridge the Digital Divide (CBDD) provided funding and resources. Three WSU students spent six weeks in Rwanda helping to set up the centre and train the local staff. USAID continued to be involved with the coffee industry in Rwanda, including Maraba, through the Sustaining Partnerships to enhance Rural Enterprise and Agribusiness Development (SPREAD) programme, launched in 2006. This was a multi-year collaboration with OCIR-Café with the goal of improving access to cooperatives for farmers, and also identifying specific taste characteristics of coffees in different regions of Rwanda. In a 2011 report on geographical indicators for products in Africa, French economist Thierry Coulet wrote that the SPREAD programme was pursuing a designation of origin certification for Rwandan coffee, including that of Maraba in particular.

=== Recent years ===
In 2008 Rwanda hosted a Cup of Excellence competition, becoming the first African country to host the event. A national panel tasted and selected a number of premium coffees, which were then scored by a panel of international coffee experts in a cupping event held at Maraba's laboratory in Kizi. The judges gave a Cup of Excellence award to coffees from twenty-four farms, of which three were part of the Maraba coffee cooperative. The Cup of Excellence returned to Rwanda every year from 2010 to 2015 and again in 2018, with Abahuzamugambi ba Kawa farms among the winners on every occasion.

Maraba coffee celebrated its tenth anniversary in 2012. The number of growers in the cooperative had reached 1,400 at that point, with assets totalling 250 million Rwandan francs (400,000 US$ as of 2012). (Note: Conversion to US dollars using rate of 630.8365753011 RWF per USD, as at 31 December 2012.)

Starting in 2013, the cooperative began an expansion programme. It added 1,550 hectares (3,800 acres) of new coffee growing land by 2015, with the first harvests in the same year. The programme aimed to add up to 2,100 hectares (5,200 acres) to the cooperative's plantation area. Maraba was experiencing increased competition from other growers, as the quantity of quality coffee on the market had expanded. The leaders of the expansion programme therefore made quality a high priority, to maintain the confidence of buyers.

== Geography and climate ==
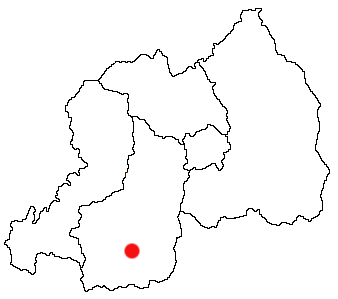
Location of Maraba, Rwanda

Maraba coffee is grown in the south of Rwanda at coordinates 2°35′S 29°40′E, roughly 12 kilometres (7 mi) from Butare and 150 kilometres (93 mi) from the capital, Kigali. The project began in the Maraba District of Butare Province, but these entities were replaced under local government organisation in 2006, and the area is now part of Huye District in the Southern Province. The area is very hilly, due to its proximity to the Western Rift Valley and the montane Nyungwe Forest, and features rich volcanic soils. The coffee is grown at altitudes between 1,700 and 2,100 metres (5,577–6,890 ft) above sea level, often on steep hillsides with terrace farming. The area experiences an average of 115 centimetres (45 in) of rainfall annually. The majority of this falls during the rainy season of March to May, the major coffee harvesting season. The high altitude lowers the temperature slightly to an average of about 20 °C (68 °F). There is little seasonal variation.

== Production cycle ==
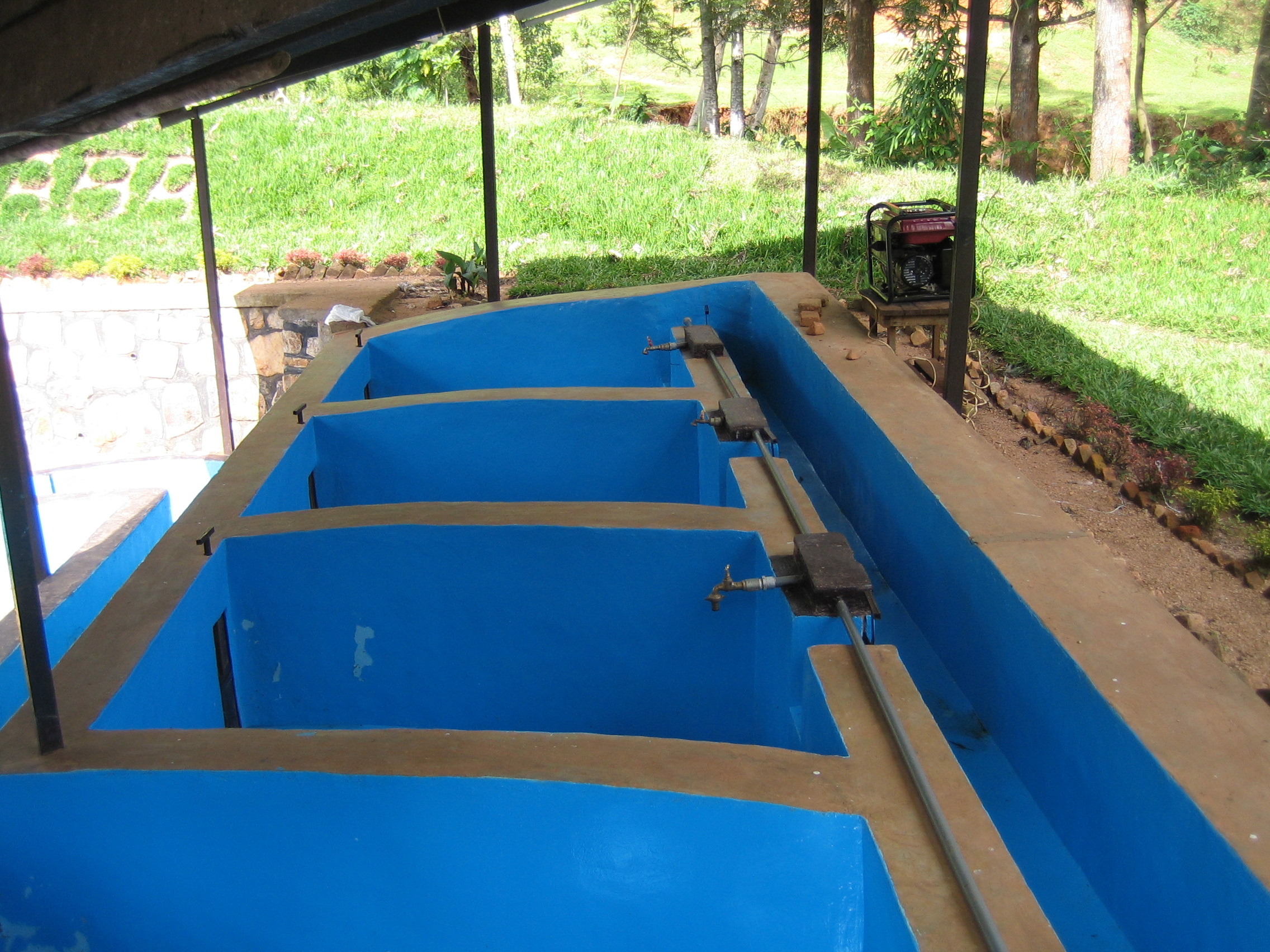
The holding tanks

The main harvesting season for coffee in Rwanda is during the major rainy season, running from March to the end of May. At harvest time, farmers spend most of the day picking cherries by hand. In the evening, they carry them in traditional baskets woven from banana leaves to the washing station, which may be several hours away. Technicians hand-sort the beans to pick out the best cherries, those with a deep red colour, and return the remainder to the grower to be sold on to markets outside the Maraba process at a lower price. The technicians pay the grower US$0.10 per kilogram. This money accumulates, and the association pays it each fortnight into farmers' bank accounts.

The technicians start the washing process immediately, since delay can cause fermentation of the sugary coating surrounding the bean and ruination of the coffee flavour. The beans are first thrown into a deep tank; the best cherries sink to the bottom and pass through a machine that removes their skin. The technicians remove any floating cherries and process them in the same way as the others for the cooperative to sell on the domestic market for less than speciality-coffee price. The beans are fed through one of the cooperative's three de-skinning and selection machines to remove their skins and most of the sugary coating before running the individual beans through a vibrating colander. The colander separates the very highest quality Grade A beans from those labelled Grade B; the two grades are sent separately down the hill in a water chute with a 1 percent gradient. This process allows for further separation of beans based on quality, with around 15 tanks available at the bottom for capture of the different types. The beans are kept submerged, two days for the best and 15–20 hours for the lesser beans, which causes a small amount of fermentation to convert the remainder of the sugar without significantly impairing the flavour.

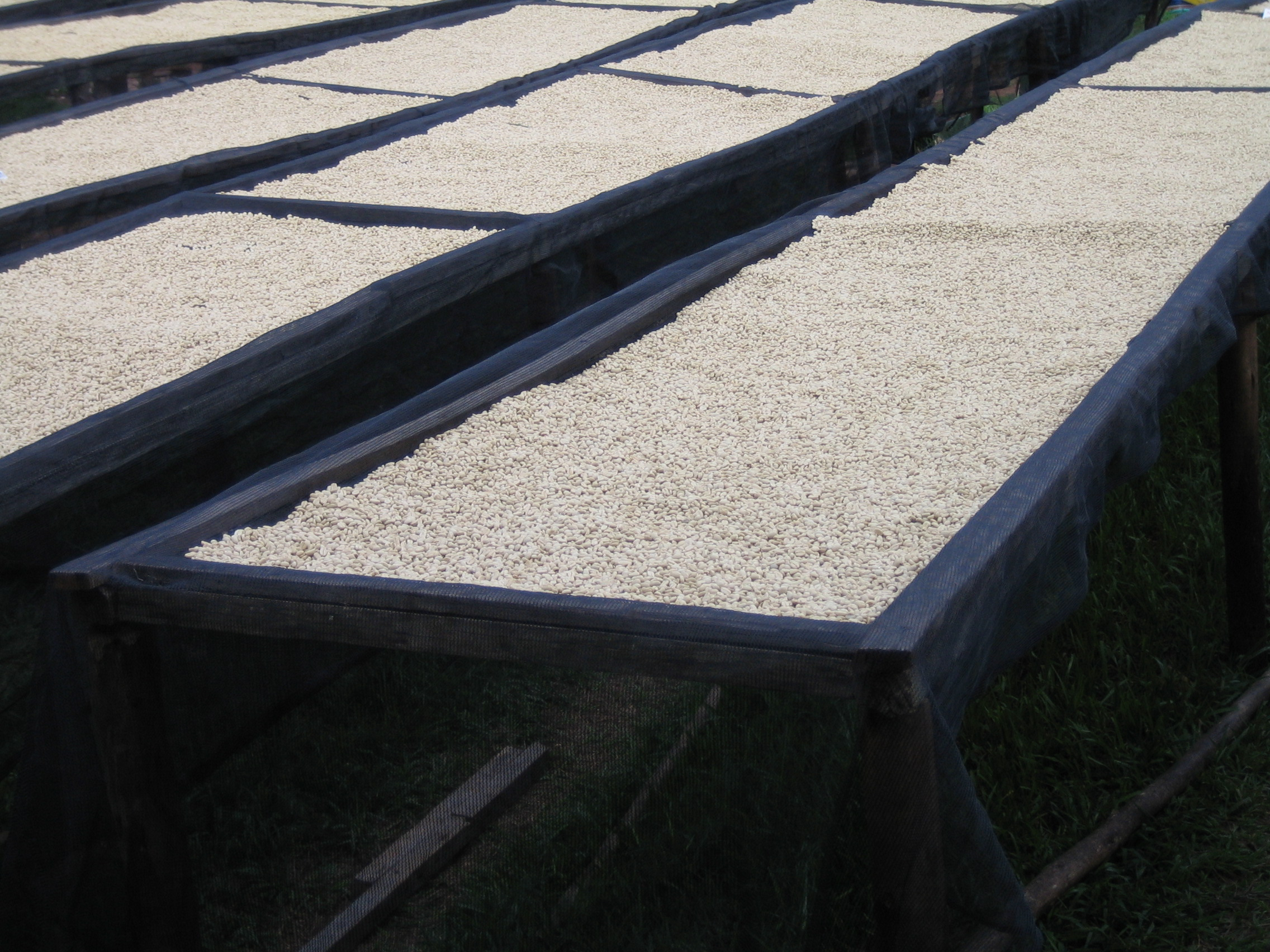
Washed beans drying on racks

The technicians wash the beans several times to remove the remains of the skin and coating and put them out on shaded racks to dry. Cooperative employees turn the beans regularly as technicians spot and remove bad beans. A longer drying process of up to two weeks in the sun follows (with provision for quick covering in the event of rain), again with constant turning. This last process reduces the water content of the bean from 40 percent to 12 percent.

The technicians then move the beans to the technical centre in nearby Kizi. Certain machines, housed in a warehouse up the side of the hill, remove the parchment skins from the beans. Employees take the beans into the adjacent laboratory for the final quality control process – hand sorting – which is carried out by several experienced women. The beans are bagged and labelled according to their quality, and stored in the compound's warehouse to await sale.

== Products and customers ==
In its early years, during the 2000s, Maraba produced 80 short tons (73,000 kg) of export-quality coffee per year, of which 40 tons went to roasters and sellers in the United Kingdom and 40 tons to the United States.

The coffee has appeared in the following products:

- Maraba Bourbon coffee, produced by Union Coffee for Sainsbury's and other UK-based outlets.
- "New Orleans Jazz" Blend and Hotel blend, two Community Coffee brands containing a blend of Maraba and other coffees. As of 2006, Community are considering launching Maraba as a single origin brand.
- Café de Maraba, the brand produced by Rwanda Roasters and sold in upmarket shops in Rwanda, including all Total petrol stations and the Intercontinental Hotel.
- Meantime Coffee, the beer produced by Meantime Breweries of London.
- Intelligentsia has used the coffee in various blends in 2005, due to their shipment arriving late, but intends also to launch it as a single-origin brand in the future.

As of 2026 the Abahuzamugambi ba Kawa Maraba cooperative, comprising around 1600 small producers, produces between about 115,200 kg and 192,000 kg (approximately 115–192 tons) of green coffee annually, reflecting increased export volumes compared with the 80 short tons reported in 2006. The coffee is Fairtrade and organic certified and marketed as specialty Arabica Bourbon.

== See also ==
- Coffee production in Rwanda
- Economics of coffee
- History of coffee
- International Fairtrade Certification Mark
- Kuapa Kokoo
