= Sovu =

Sovu may refer to:

- Sovu, Rwanda, a village in the Southern Province of Rwanda
- Şovu, a village in the Lankaran Rayon of Azerbaijan.
