= Community Coffee =

U.S. coffee roaster and distributor

- Type: Private
- Industry: Coffee roasting
- Founded: Baton Rouge, Louisiana, United States (1919; 107 years ago)
- Founder: Norman "Cap" Saurage
- Products: Coffee beverages
- Website: communitycoffee.com

Community Coffee is a coffee roaster and distributor based in Baton Rouge, Louisiana, United States. As of 2005, it was the largest family-owned coffee brand in the United States, controlling 52% of the market in South Louisiana and 72% in Baton Rouge, and employing 850 people. The company has distribution throughout markets in the Southeastern United States. Community Coffee also has a sponsorship deal with Audacy-owned station WWL-AM.

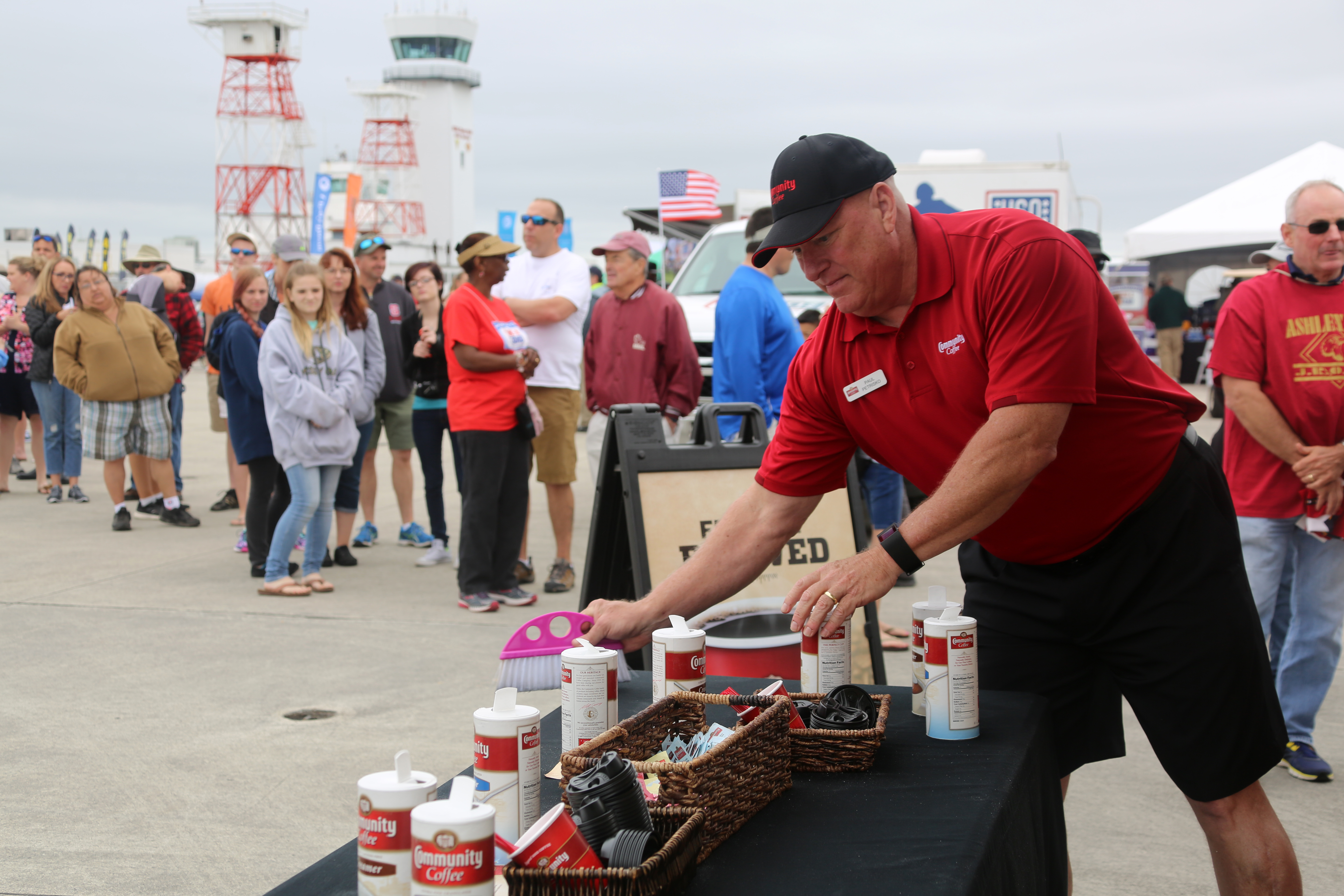
Paul Petrisko, Community Coffee retail sales representative, setting up promotional display at an event in Cherry Point, North Carolina

Community Coffee originated in 1919 when company founder Norman "Cap" Saurage began experimenting with coffee blends at his two grocery stores in downtown Baton Rouge. Demand for the coffee increased to the extent that by 1923, Saurage moved his coffee production to a converted barn, and in 1924, left his grocery business to focus on coffee.

In the late 1950s, and early to late 1960s, Jim Henson made a series of commercials for Community starring the early Muppet characters Wilkins and Wontkins. Mostly, these were remakes of commercials originally produced for the Wilkins Coffee company.

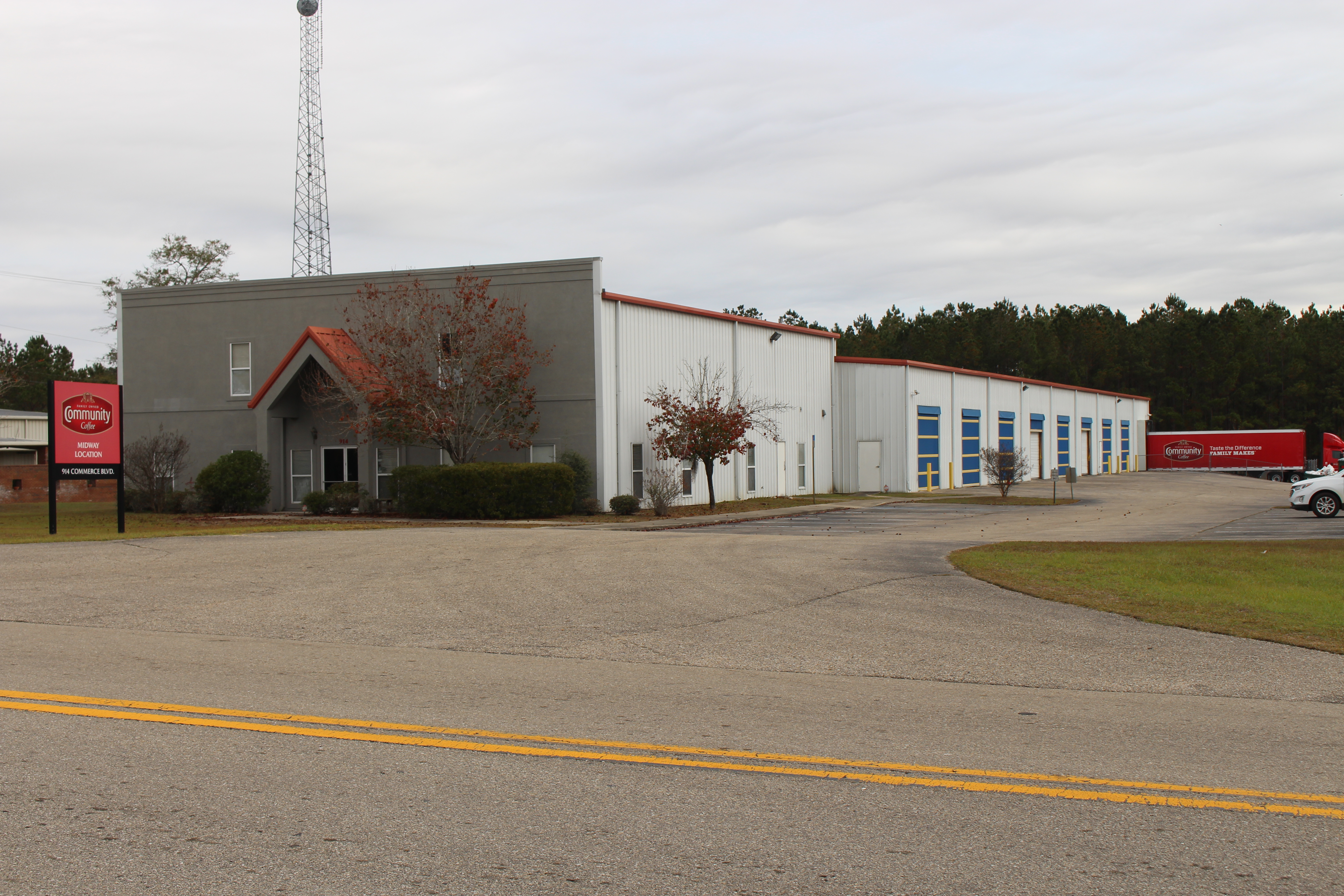
Community Coffee distribution center in Midway, Gadsden County, Florida

The company now imports coffee beans from Brazil, Colombia, and Mexico through ports in New Orleans and Houston. Since 1988, it has run a program in which UPC labels from its products can be redeemed for donations to Louisiana schools. In 2002 Community entered into a deal with the Abahuzamugambi farming cooperative in Rwanda, facilitated by the PEARL agricultural program, to purchase Maraba coffee. This was the first direct contract between an African farming cooperative and American coffee roaster.

In 1995, Community Coffee began opening a chain of retail coffeehouses throughout Louisiana. Community also launched stores in Texas and Alabama; however, ventures in neighboring states failed due to the entrenchment of Starbucks and local brands. In 2013, Community spun off its coffee house business into a separate company named CC's Coffee House in order to facilitate out-of-state expansion. CC's remains under the ownership of the Saurage family.

In June 2026, Community Coffee partnered with Dolly Parton to offer Cup of Ambition Coffee at her Tennessean Travel Stop in Cornersville, TN off I-65 South of Nashville.

== See also ==
- Maraba Coffee
- PJ's Coffee
