= Huye =

Huye may refer to:

- Mount Huye, a mountain in southern Rwanda
- Huye (water), a bottled mineral water brand sold in Rwanda and produced on Mount Huye
- Huye (district), a district of South Province, Rwanda, which contains Mount Huye and Butare city
- Butare, Rwanda's second city and the capital of Huye District; the city itself has sometimes been known as Huye since January 2006
