= Partnership for Enhancing Agriculture in Rwanda through Linkages =

Project to promote agricultural improvement in Rwanda

The Partnership for Enhancing Agriculture in Rwanda through Linkages (PEARL) was a project to promote agricultural improvement in Rwanda.

The goal of PEARL was to assist the nation of Rwanda in its efforts to rebuild from the impacts of the 1994 Genocide Against Tutsi. PEARL worked with rural communities across Rwanda to generate revenue through the development of agricultural products and market linkages.

PEARL was funded by the United States Agency for International Development and led by researchers at Michigan State University, Texas A&M University and various Rwandan bodies including the National University of Rwanda, the Agricultural Research Institute of Rwanda, the Kigali Institute of Science, Technology and Management and the Rwandan National Coffee Board. University resources were channeled directly into rural areas to promote agricultural improvement and increase revenues.

The project worked with grower cooperatives on the production and marketing of various agricultural products, focusing on coffee and cassava products. Increasing attention to quality control and consistency in production has led to success in worldwide exports. An example of such success is the production and sales of Maraba Coffee from Maraba, Rwanda. The PEARL Director was Dr. Timothy Schilling.
