= Wellington Jewels =

American jewelry store chain, 1960s–1992

Wellington Jewels was a Washington, D.C.–based jewelry store and direct mail chain, operating from the 1960s through the 1990s. The jewelry store chain specialized in artificial diamond jewelry and sold high-quality gold and platinum settings containing imitation gems, marketed by Mac and Helen Ver Standig's elaborate and highly successful advertising as prominently-labeled "counterfeit diamonds".

== History ==
Wellington Jewels was a business venture of marketer, socialite and activist Helen Ver Standig (née Von Stondeg), promoted as "Madame Wellington", and her husband Moishe Belmont "Mac" Ver Standig.

While on vacation in Switzerland in 1961, Helen met a man who was developing jewelry based on strontium titanate. She invested $10,000 in his work and the Ver Standigs launched their jewelry business in 1964.

Helen Ver Standig was the subject of a caricature that The New York Times cartoonist Al Hirschfeld drew at her husband's request, which was extensively used in the chain's advertising as "Madame Wellington".

The Ver Standigs, who were experienced advertising agents and marketers, mounted extensive campaigns using the Hirschfeld caricature and Helen's "Madame Wellington" persona to market the brand, prominently advertising the fake diamonds in straightforward terms. Madame Wellington jewelry was purchased by politicians, a First lady and a Supreme Court justice. The Ver Standigs made a point of publicizing when their store was periodically burglarized, with advertisements prominently warning "BEWARE OF DIAMOND SWINDLERS". According to Helen Ver Standig, a European noble family bought a $25,000 fake tiara. Wellington Jewels had a total of 42 stores either owned by the Ver Standigs or licensed in the United States, Canada and Europe.

Wellington jewels were frequently purchased by owners of large genuine diamonds, who preferred to keep the real items in a vault, but wanted to still appear to be wearing them. The average stone sold by the Palm Beach, Wellington store was 15 carats, at a 1971 price of $40 per carat, versus a diamond at $800 to $1600 per carat. A shipment of fake Wellington diamonds that was stolen at John F. Kennedy International Airport in New York was sold as real for $700 per carat. Since strontium titanate has almost the same refractive index as diamond, an appraisal based solely on refractive index will not reveal the fake's true nature. The largest Wellington stones were 60 carats. Wellington's settings were of high quality, using 14 or 18 carat gold, and the stones were cut in Germany, Switzerland, France or Israel by professional diamond cutters. The stones were sold in plain black boxes that indicated neither genuineness nor imitation.

In 1992, the M. Belmont Ver Standig group sold Wellington Jewels to the QVC network.

== Helen Ver Standig ==
Helen Van Stondeg was born in Washington, D.C. on July 11, 1920, the granddaughter of Jewish immigrants from Poland. After graduation from Woodrow Wilson High School (now Jackson-Reed High School) in 1936, she worked in her father's tailor shop. In 1938 Mac Ver Standig, a newspaper manager from Boston, visited the shop to discuss the similar family names and possible common ancestry. Mac and Helen eloped two days later and married in Elkton, Maryland, with a $15 diamond ring bought in a pawn shop.

The Ver Standigs sold newspaper advertising in Massachusetts and bought weekly newspapers in Cranston, Rhode Island and Greer, South Carolina, then moved to Washington and sold advertising for WWDC radio, and then opened their own advertising agency. The agency was for a time the largest south of New York. Clients included Geico, Dart Drug and Hot Shoppes. A 1957 campaign for Wilkins Coffee employed two puppets created by University of Maryland student Jim Henson in a series of consistently violent eight-second ads. The puppets, named Wilkins and Wontkins and voiced by Henson, became a basis for The Muppets.

After selling the advertising business, Mac and Helen concentrated on their simulated diamond business and management of their resort hotel on Cape Cod. Mac died in 1972. Helen invested in radio stations and started a real estate management company. Helen Ver Standig died on September 9, 2006 of respiratory failure at Sibley Memorial Hospital in Washington.
