= Wilkins and Wontkins =

Advertising characters

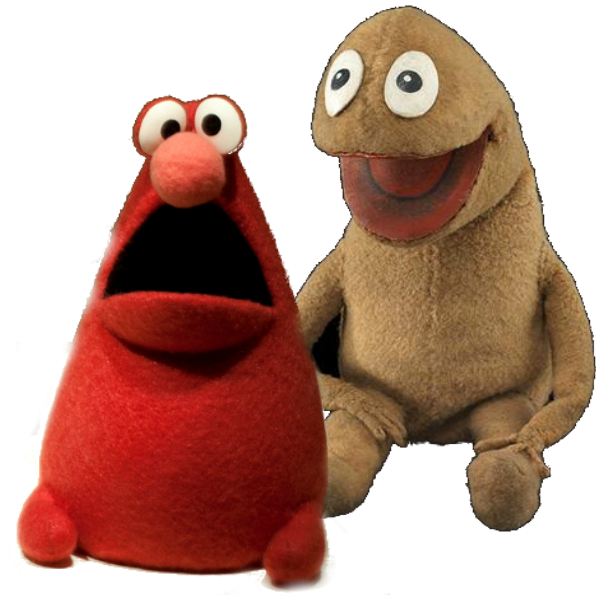
- The original Wilkins (right) and Wontkins puppets (1957)
- First appearance: 1957
- Last appearance: 1969 (original) not defunct (Wilkins Coffee II)
- Created by: Jim Henson
- Voiced by: Jim Henson

In-universe information
- Alias: Puppet
- Species: Muppet
- Gender: Male
- Title: John H. Wilkins Sr.
- Nationality: American for John Wilkins Jr (long name for Wilkins) Texas for Wontkins Raveas (for Wontkins)

Wilkins and Wontkins are characters created by puppeteer Jim Henson for the Wilkins Coffee brand. The coffee was produced and sold in the United States by John H Wilkins & Company in Washington, D.C. "Wilkins", a character who enjoys Wilkins Coffee, and "Wontkins", a character who does not, are used to advertise the coffee.

== Background ==
Wilkins Coffee was founded in 1899 by John H. Wilkins Sr. The company sold coffee, tea and spices. His son John Wilkins Jr. later took over the business.

Wilkins Coffee's slogan was "Try Wilkins Coffee—It's Just Wonderful!"; a later slogan used in advertisements was "Rich ... Rich ... Double Rich".

== Wilkins and Wontkins ==
Collection of Wilkins and Wontkins Commercials.

In 1957, Jim Henson was hired by Helen Ver Standig, who worked on advertising Wilkins Coffee, to produce commercials using early Muppet characters. Henson produced these commercials from 1957 to 1961. Each ad ran for about 10 seconds. They were composed of an 8-second puppet skit and a 2-second shot of the advertised Wilkins product. The ads were very successful. In 1958, 25,000 puppets of Wilkins and Wontkins were sold for one dollar each. There were also ads for Wilkins Tea and Wilkins Instant Coffee. Jim Henson also used Wilkins and Wontkins in ads for several other brands, such as Community Coffee, Nash's Coffee, Red Diamond Coffee, La Touraine Coffee, Jomar Instant Coffee, Kraml Dairy, Calso Water, Taystee Bread, Dugan's Bread, Merita Bread, Frank's Beverages, Faygo, and Standard Oil of Ohio (SOHIO). The last ads to feature Wilkins and Wontkins were ads for Community Coffee in 1969.

In the typical format of the ads, the gleeful Wilkins would attempt to persuade the sour Wontkins to drink Wilkins Coffee; Wontkins would almost always grumpily refuse, leading Wilkins (or an assisting outside force, such as an animal, a vehicle, an object, a hand, or company president Mr. Wilkins) to commit some act of extreme violence, such as shooting him, running him over, or executing him in an electric chair.

== Later history ==
"Cannon" Wilkins Coffee commercial (1958).

John H. Wilkins, Jr. died in 1967 of a heart ailment.

Wilkins Coffee had a number-one retail spot in the 1950s, but as competition got tougher with companies such as General Mills and Folgers, Wilkins began losing its market share. In the early 1990s, after the death of Jim Henson, Wilkins Coffee started to sell Wilkins and Wontkins shirts to try to regain popularity.

Wilkins Coffee has been defunct since 1997.

In recent years, the Wilkins Coffee ads have gone viral online due to their excessive use of violence.

== Book cites ==
- Coffee and Tea Industries and the Flavor Field. 1918. p. 948.
- Davis, M. (2008). Street Gang: The Complete History of Sesame Street. Viking. p. 82. ISBN 978-0-670-01996-0.
- Jones, B.J. (2015). "Chapter Four - Muppets, Inc.". Jim Henson: The Biography. Ballantine Books. ISBN 978-0-345-52612-0.
- Boyd's Directory of the District of Columbia for ... R.L. Polk & Company. 1920. p. 142.
