= Təngivan =

- Location within Azerbaijan
- Coordinates: 38°43′34″N 48°40′39″E
- Country: Azerbaijan
- Rayon: Lankaran
- Municipality: Şovu
- Time zone: UTC+4 (AZT)
  - Summer (DST): UTC+5 (AZT)

Təngivan (also, Tangevan and Tankivan) is a village in the Lankaran Rayon of Azerbaijan. The village forms part of the municipality of Şovu.
