= Mount Huye =

Mountain in Rwanda

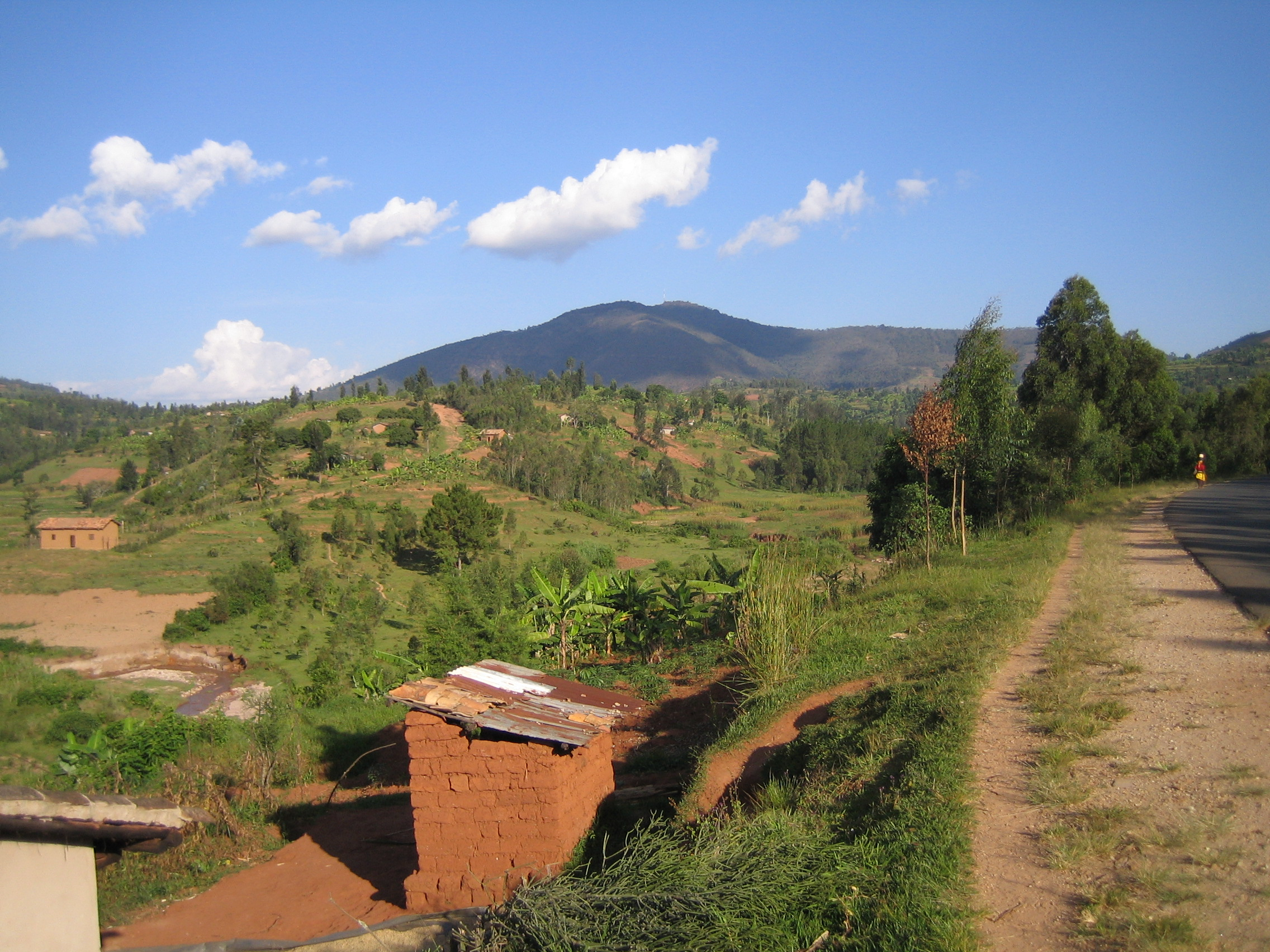
- Mount Huye in 2006

Highest point
- Elevation: 2,278 m (7,474 ft)
- Coordinates: 02°34′S 29°39′E

Geography
- Location: Rwanda

Mount Huye is a mountain located near to the city of Butare in southern Rwanda. It is connected by a ridge to Nyungwe Forest to the west, and is on the outer edges of the Albertine Rift, the western branch of the East African Rift. The mountain is an important source of mineral water, supplying both the Huye bottled water brand sold throughout Rwanda and the nearby Maraba fair trade coffee plant, whose washing station receives Huye water via a pipeline built using ACDI/VOCA funding in 2002.

Mount Huye gives its name to the surrounding Huye District, part of the Southern Province, which was formed in January 2006 following local government reorganisation and includes Butare city.
