= Şuvi, Astara =

Şuvi
- Municipality
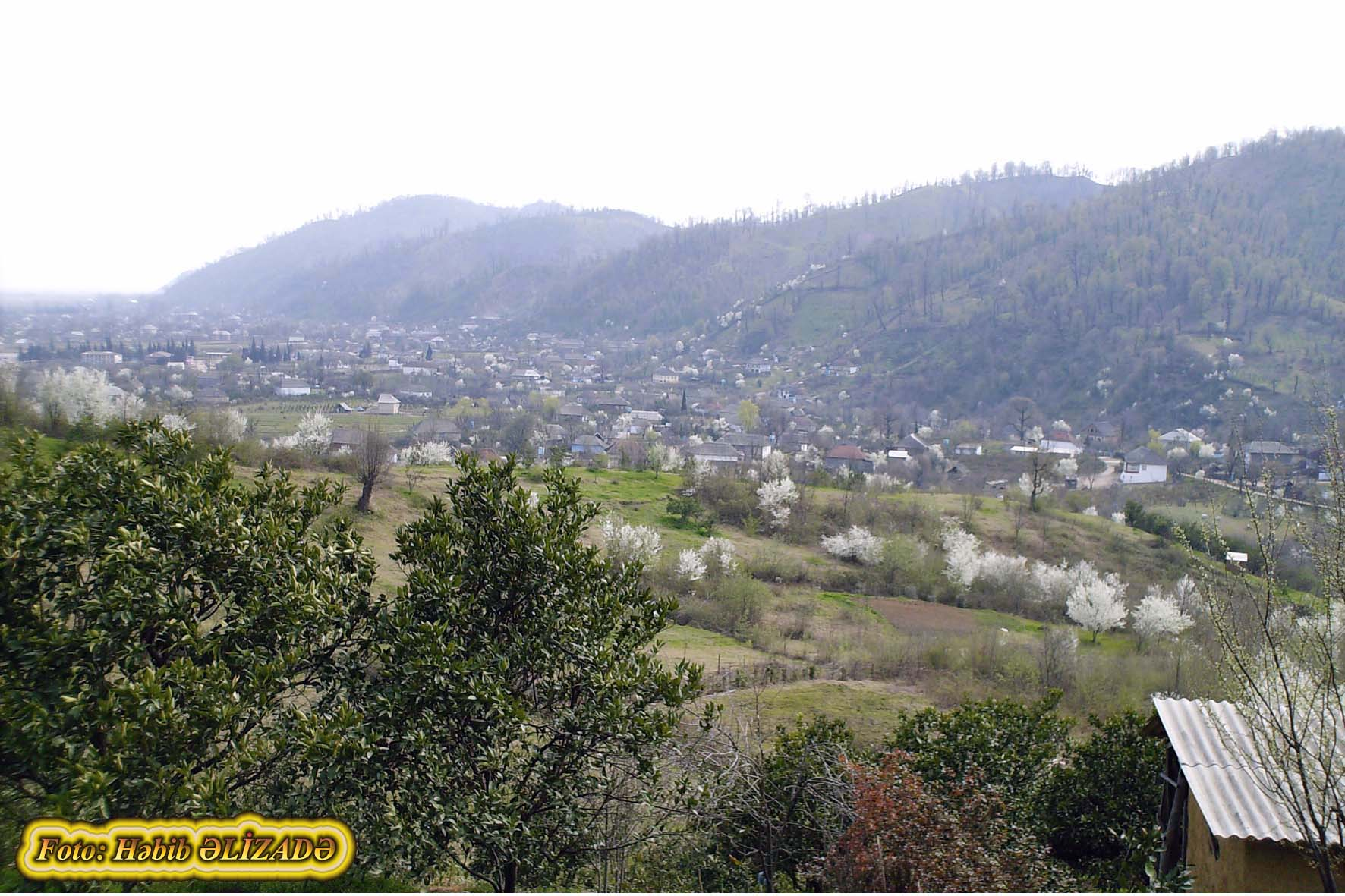
- View of Astara from above

- Location within Azerbaijan
- Coordinates: 38°29′46″N 48°46′04″E
- Country: Azerbaijan
- Rayon: Astara

Population
  - Total: 1,072
- Time zone: UTC+4 (AZT)

Şuvi (also, Shuvi) is a village and municipality in the Astara Rayon of Azerbaijan. It has a population of 1,072.
