= Center to Bridge the Digital Divide =

The Center to Bridge the Digital Divide (CBDD) was a self-sustaining outreach unit of the Washington State University Extension. Founded in 2001, the CBDD was an ICT4D organization committed to assisting under-served populations leverage information communication technologies (ICT) to better their lives and achieve desired goals. Unlike traditional digital divide initiatives, the CBDD's strategic focus was not on gaining access to technology but on helping target communities achieve successful application of ICT.

The CBDD was a project-based non-academic unit working with rural communities in Washington State, Community Technology Organizations in the State of Washington, as well as eleven African countries and Afghanistan. This focus on domestic rural communities in tandem with developing countries is another special distinction that made the Center to Bridge the Digital Divide unique among its peers.

The Center's main offices were located on the Washington State University Spokane campus with additional offices on the main campus in Pullman, in Olympia, Kirkland, and Kabul Afghanistan.

== History ==
Founded as a unit within Washington State University's Cooperative Extension in 2001 with startup donations and a single employee, the CBDD grew to a mature organization with 15 full-time employees, hundreds of partnerships, and global initiatives. It has since been renamed, re-focused, and transformed into the WSU Extension Program for Digital Inclusion.

=== Initial organization ===
The CBDD was originally conceived as a digital divide organization dedicated to bringing opportunities to rural communities in Washington State. An early initiative included a teleworking project aimed at bringing information based jobs to communities struggling with the loss of natural resource based jobs. In 2002, The Bill and Melinda Gates Foundation contracted with the CBDD to facilitate the start-up of six High Tech High Schools in rural Washington. At this time the CBDD also expanded its role within University Extension by managing 4-H technology programs throughout the state of Washington.

=== International expansion ===
Expansion into international initiatives and the ICT4D community significantly changed overall makeup. In 2002 the Center contracted with USAID to develop and manage the $3.5 million NetTel@Africa project. NetTel is a capacity building initiative that has made it possible for universities in eleven African nations to train and employ telecommunications regulators and policy makers. Since the conclusion of the NetTel initiative, the CBDD has expanded the model to reform higher education in Afghanistan through the Afghanistan eQuality Alliances.

=== Deeper integration into the University and state of Washington ===
In recent years, the Center to Bridge the Digital Divide was engaged in developing the Communities Connect Network, a statewide network focused on supporting and advancing community development in Washington state through the use of community technology. The Center also developed opportunities for university students to participate in service learning activities and international internships.

Beginning in 2007, the CBDD's projects were organized into three thematic workgroups:

1. The Rural Networks group - involved in programming designed to empower families, individuals and communities to successfully participate in opportunities enabled through access and use of information communication technologies.
2. The Digital Futures Networks workgroup - tasked to work with culturally diverse communities with a special emphasis on research.
3. The Global Networks workgroup - seeks solutions to challenges in developing nations through international alliances that expand capacity of higher education to meet knowledge and human resource needs.

== Partnerships ==
Reliance on an extensive network of partnerships was a governing principle of CBDD activities. In addition to the network of professionals within WSU Extension, the CBDD worked closely with The Bill and Melinda Gates Foundation, USAID, The Northwest Area Foundation, The US Department of State, many leaders in Washington state's rural communities, thirty six African universities, government ministries in partnering countries, as well as organizations from both the public and private sector.

== Activities ==
Although projects comprise the CBDD's foundation, Center staff are engaged in a wide variety of activities. The CBDD director addressed W3C meetings on several occasions. CBDD staff are frequent contributors to conferences, professional journals, broadcasts, and private consulting.

== See also ==
- e-Readiness
- Knowledge divide
