= Maraba, Rwanda =

Sector of Huye District in Rwanda

Coordinates: 2°30′57″S 29°41′04″E

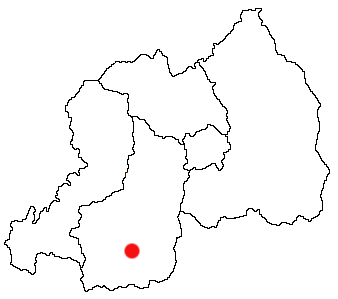
Approximate location of Maraba, Rwanda

Maraba is a sector of Huye District in the Southern Province in southern Rwanda. It used to be a district in the Butare Province before a government decentralization programme that re-organized the country's administrative divisions in 2006. The closest major city is Butare.

Maraba is most notable for its agricultural industry, which produces Maraba Coffee.
