= Sovu, Rwanda =

Village in Rwanda

Sovu is a village in the Huye District of the Southern Province in Rwanda. The village is home to one of four coffee washing stations belonging to the Maraba coffee cooperative, Abahuzamugambi ba kawa, used by around 400 of the cooperatives farmers.
