= Union Hand-Roasted Coffee =

British coffee roasting business

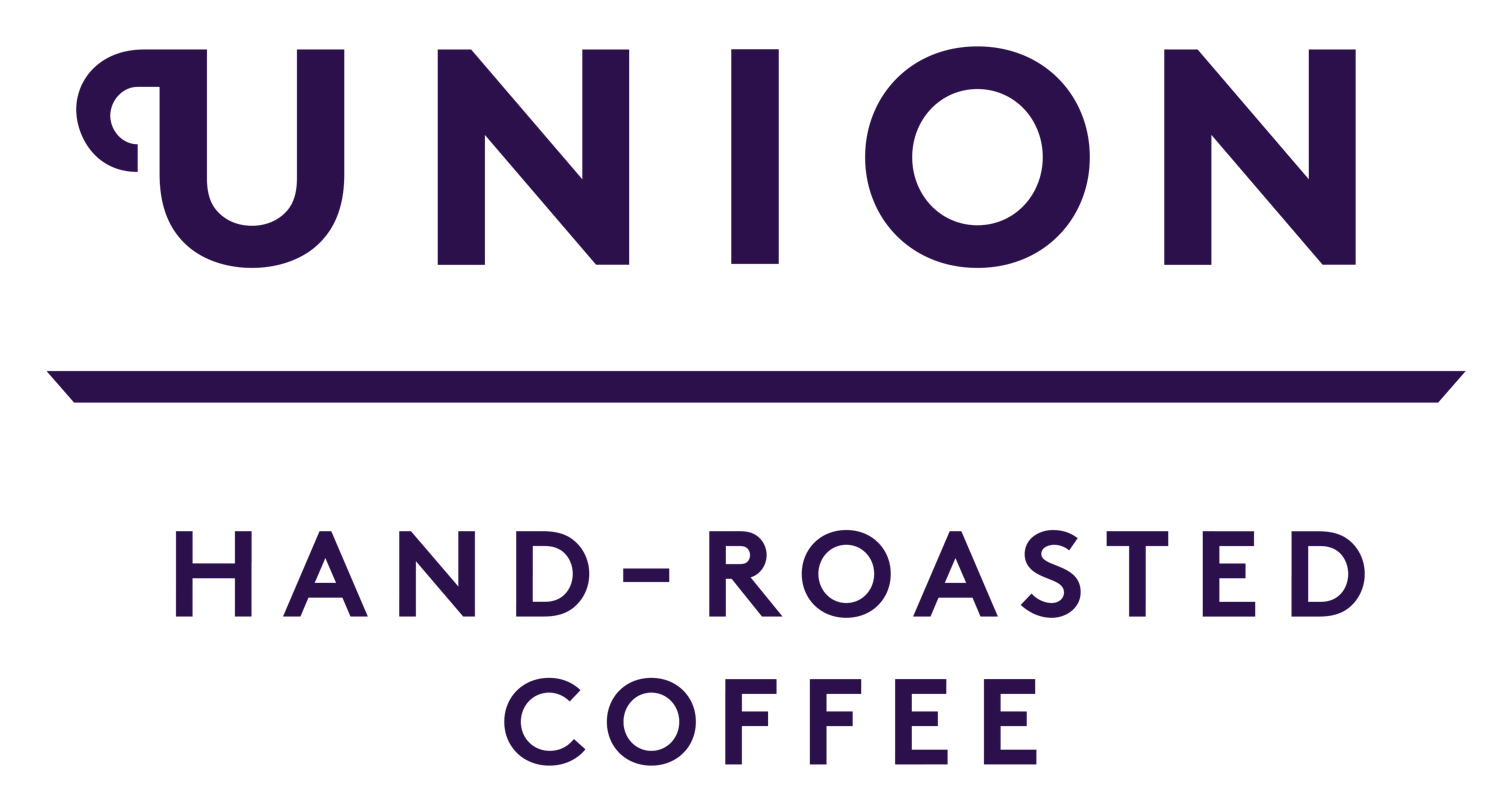
- Type: Private
- Industry: Coffee roasting
- Predecessor: Torz & Macatonia
- Founded: Star Lane in East London, (14 June 2001) --> Present
- Founder: Jeremy Torz; Steven Macatonia
- Headquarters: Star Lane, East London, UK
- Area served: United Kingdom
- Products: Speciality Coffee, Single Origin Coffee, Microlot Coffee, Coffee Blends
- Services: Coffee, Coffee Roasting, Wholesale Supplier
- Number of employees: 50+
- Website: www.unionroasted.com

Union Hand-Roasted Coffee (formerly Union Coffee Roasters) is a privately owned British coffee roasting business based in East London, United Kingdom. The company was founded in 2001 by Jeremy Torz and Steven Macatonia. According to the trade publication Coffee House, the company bridges independent and mainstream markets by working under craft principles while selling products in supermarkets.

Hand-roasted coffee is produced in small batches under the supervision of a roaster who manually monitors the roasting process.

== History ==
While working at Peet's Coffee & Tea in San Francisco in the early 1990s, Jeremy Torz and Stephen Macatonia developed an interest in coffee. They observed the coffee culture in San Francisco, which differed from the contemporary market in the United Kingdom.

Macatonia worked as an immunologist and Torz as an optometrist before founding the business. They remained for four years to study the regional coffee industry and roasting techniques.

Returning to the UK in 1994, they established Torz and Macatonia as a wholesale coffee roasting business.

In 1995, they became the main supplier for the Seattle Coffee Company, the first major coffee shop chain in the UK. Torz and Macatonia eventually merged with The Seattle Coffee Company in 1997 which was then acquired by Starbucks in 1998.

Torz and Macatonia left the company in 2000. In 2001, they founded private company Union Coffee Roasters and in 2007, it was rebranded to Union Hand-Roasted Coffee.

By 2005, the company was producing 11 different lines, four of which were special editions and seven of which were for sale in Sainsbury's, Asda, the Co-op and Somerfield. In 2015, Union rebranded its corporate identity, updating its logo, changing its product lines for Waitrose". and Ocado and introducing a subscription service called CoffeeClub.

== Distribution and partnerships ==
Union Coffee supplies wholesale specialty coffee and barista training Gail's Artisan Bakery, Brasserie Blanc and Peach Pubs.
