= Şovu =

- Municipality
- Location within Azerbaijan
- Coordinates: 38°43′48″N 48°42′27″E
- Country: Azerbaijan
- Rayon: Lankaran

Population
  - Total: 1,674
- Time zone: UTC+4 (AZT)
  - Summer (DST): UTC+5 (AZT)

Şovu (also, Şuvi, Shovu, and Shuvi) is a village and municipality in the Lankaran Rayon of Azerbaijan. It has a population of 1,674. The municipality consists of the villages of Şovu and Təngivan.
